= Joseph Foster Barham I =

English owner of the Mesopotamia plantation in Jamaica

Joseph Foster Barham I (1729–1789) was the English owner of the Mesopotamia plantation in Westmoreland Parish, Jamaica. Originally Joseph Foster, he took Barham as an additional surname (1750) for Henry Barham M.D., son of Henry Barham F.R.S., in order to inherit his sugar plantations in the Colony of Jamaica.

== Life ==
He was the son of Colonel John Foster (1681–1731) of Elim, Jamaica and Egham House, Surrey, and his wife Elizabeth Smith. After John Foster died in 1731, Elizabeth took two more husbands, John Ayscough, like Foster an owner of Jamaican plantations with sugar and slaves, and after Ayscough's death around 1735, Dr. Henry Barham. Barham settled in England as stepfather to the Foster family of five sons and two daughters; he died in 1746. The eldest of the Fosters was Thomas who was Member of Parliament for Dorchester. The other sons were: John, William, Samuel, and Joseph. Of the two daughters, Margaret married Colin Campbell, and Sarah married William Mathew Burt.

Joseph Foster was educated at Eton College, and went on a Grand Tour. The change of his surname to Foster-Barham was a condition of his stepfather Henry Barham's will. It was carried out by a private act of Parliament, Barham's Name Act 1748 (22 Geo. 2. c. 14 Pr.), around 1749. He visited the Mesopotamia estate in Jamaica, and returned to England in 1751. There his religious views were affected by the preaching of John Cennick. He also met Dorothy Vaughan, and they were married in 1754.

Foster Barham settled in Bedford, and was a Moravian from 1756 (as was his brother William, also living in Bedford). An evangelical Christian, his friends included John Newton from 1773, in his days as a curate at Olney.

After his first wife died, in 1781, Foster Barham moved away from the Moravians. He married again, in a Church of England ceremony in 1785; and moved to his new wife's home, Hardwick Hall in Shropshire.

== Mesopotamia estate ==
The Mesopotamia plantation dated from the beginning of the 18th century. It passed by marriage from the Stephenson family to the younger Henry Barham; and then to Foster Barham. Ephraim Stephenson died in 1726; his widow Mary shortly married a Mr. Heith, who soon died, and she married Henry Barham in early 1728. She died in 1735.

In 1750, Joseph was old enough to inherit the estate, and he became sole operator in 1756 when his mother died. His estates at Mesopotamia and Island produced enough sugar and rum to grant him annual profits of more than £7,000 a year, which enabled him to live in comfort in their English estate in Bedford.

Joseph Foster Barham I and his son of the same name ran a Moravian mission for the slaves, and required accurate record-keeping of the slave population. Extensive archives exist. The mission station existed from 1760 to 1835.

However, Joseph's religious convictions did not extend to granting his slaves their freedom. Over half of the slaves inventoried by his step-father Dr Henry Barham in 1736 had died by the time Joseph visited Mesopotamia in 1750. A year later, Joseph paid his attorney, Dr James Paterson, to purchase 21 more African slaves to bolster the workforce. In 1751, Mesopotamia had 285 slaves, but the death rate continued to be high on that estate. So, between 1763 and 1774, Joseph authorised the purchase of another 83 African slaves.

During the American War of Independence, supplies from North America to the British Caribbean were cut off, and combined with a series of hurricanes, resulted in food shortages and famine in western Jamaica. More than a score of slaves at Mesopotamia died as a result, and Joseph's son, also named Joseph, had to purchase a dozen replacement slaves. Between 1774-83, the slave population of Mesopotamia shrank from 278 to 243, so Joseph purchased another 65 slaves to reinforce the workforce. With the slave population at over 300, Joseph now benefited from an income of over £9,000 per annum.

== Family ==
Foster Barham married, first, Dorothy Vaughan, a Welsh heiress. They had three sons and three daughters:

- Mary (died 1837 aged 79), who was a correspondent of John Newton, and married George Livius in 1783. Their daughter Maria married John Johnson, William Cowper's relative and editor.
- Joseph Foster Barham (1759–1832)
- John Foster Barham (1763–1789)
- Thomas Foster Barham (1766–1844)
- Elizabeth who married the Rev. Rose and was mother of Joseph Rose of Carshalton and Rothley.
- Anna Joanna, who married Thomas Grinfield and was mother of Edward William Grinfield and Thomas Grinfield.

The sons were tutored by Aulay Macaulay. In a second marriage, Foster Barham wed Lady Mary Hill, the widow of Sir Rowland Hill, 1st Baronet.

== Death and legacy ==
On 21 July 1789, Joseph died of a paralytic stroke at the age of 59. He willed the Mesopotamia estate and its 299 slaves to his son and namesake, Joseph. The conditions at Mesopotamia were so poor that only 14% of the 102 slaves over the age of 35 were "able" to work.
