= Thomas Barham =

Thomas Barham may refer to:

- Thomas Foster Barham (musician) (1766–1844), English musician and miscellaneous writer
- Thomas Foster Barham (physician) (1794–1869), English physician and classical scholar
