= Thomas Foster Barham (physician) =

English physician and classical scholar

Thomas F. Barham
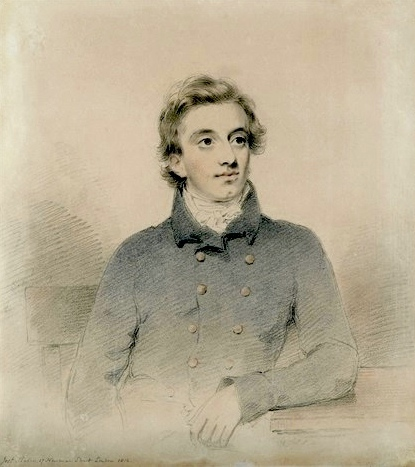
- Barham by Joseph Slater, Jr., 1816
- Born: 10 September 1794; Hendon, Middlesex, England
- Died: 3 March 1869 (aged 74); Highweek, Devon, England
- Education: Queens' College, Cambridge
- Occupation: Physician
- Spouses: Sarah Garratt (m. 1817) Margaret Henyson (m. 1843)
- Parent(s): Mary Morton (Mother); Thomas Barham (Father)
- Relatives: William Barham (Brother); Charles Barham (Brother); Francis Barham (Brother)

Thomas Foster Barham, M.B. (10 September 1794 – 3 March 1869) was an English physician and classical scholar.

== Life ==
Barham was the eldest son of the musician and writer Thomas Foster Barham. He was born at Hendon, in Middlesex, and sent to Queens' College, Cambridge, qualifying as M.B. in 1820. His family's wealth came from slavery on the sugar estates of western Jamaica.

After taking this degree he returned to Penzance in Cornwall, where he was physician to the dispensary, and in general practice for several years. About 1830 he moved to Exeter in Devon and became physician to the Exeter dispensary and institution for the blind. From early life he had been attached to the doctrines of unitarianism, and during the first part of his residence at Exeter actively supported the unitarian congregation which met at George's Chapel, Exeter. After a time he expressed an aversion to all dogmatic theology, as well as to the adoption of any sectarian name, and embodied his views on these points in a pamphlet entitled Christian Union in Churches without Dogmatism. He moved to Newton Abbot, where he conducted religious service for himself, adhering in the main to the religious tenets of his old sect. Being possessed of considerable means, he abandoned the practice of medicine on his removal from Exeter, and gave himself up to good works and the pleasures of literature. He died at Highweek, near Newton Abbot, 3 March 1869, and was buried in Highweek churchyard on 8 March.

== Works ==
Dr. Barham published many theological works, including A Monthly Course of Forms of Prayer for Domestic Worship and (with the Rev. Henry Acton) a volume of Forms of Prayer for Public Worship. His chief work, which dealt with many social questions – such as temperance, cultivation of waste lands and small farms – was entitled Philadelphia, or the Claims of Humanity (1858). The fame of his knowledge of the Greek language was not confined to his own country; his mastery of Greek was shown in his Introduction to Greek Grammar, on a new plan, 1829; Greek Roots in English Rhymes, 1837; and The Enkheiridion of Hehfaistiown, with Prolegomena (highly commended in George Grote's Greece, iv. 107) on Rhythm and Accent. A translation, in English hexameters, of the first book of the Iliad was published after his death. He was a contributor to the Monthly Repository from 1818, to the Transactions of the Cornish scientific societies, and to the Devonshire Association.
