= Charles Foster Barham =

English physician

Charles F. Barham
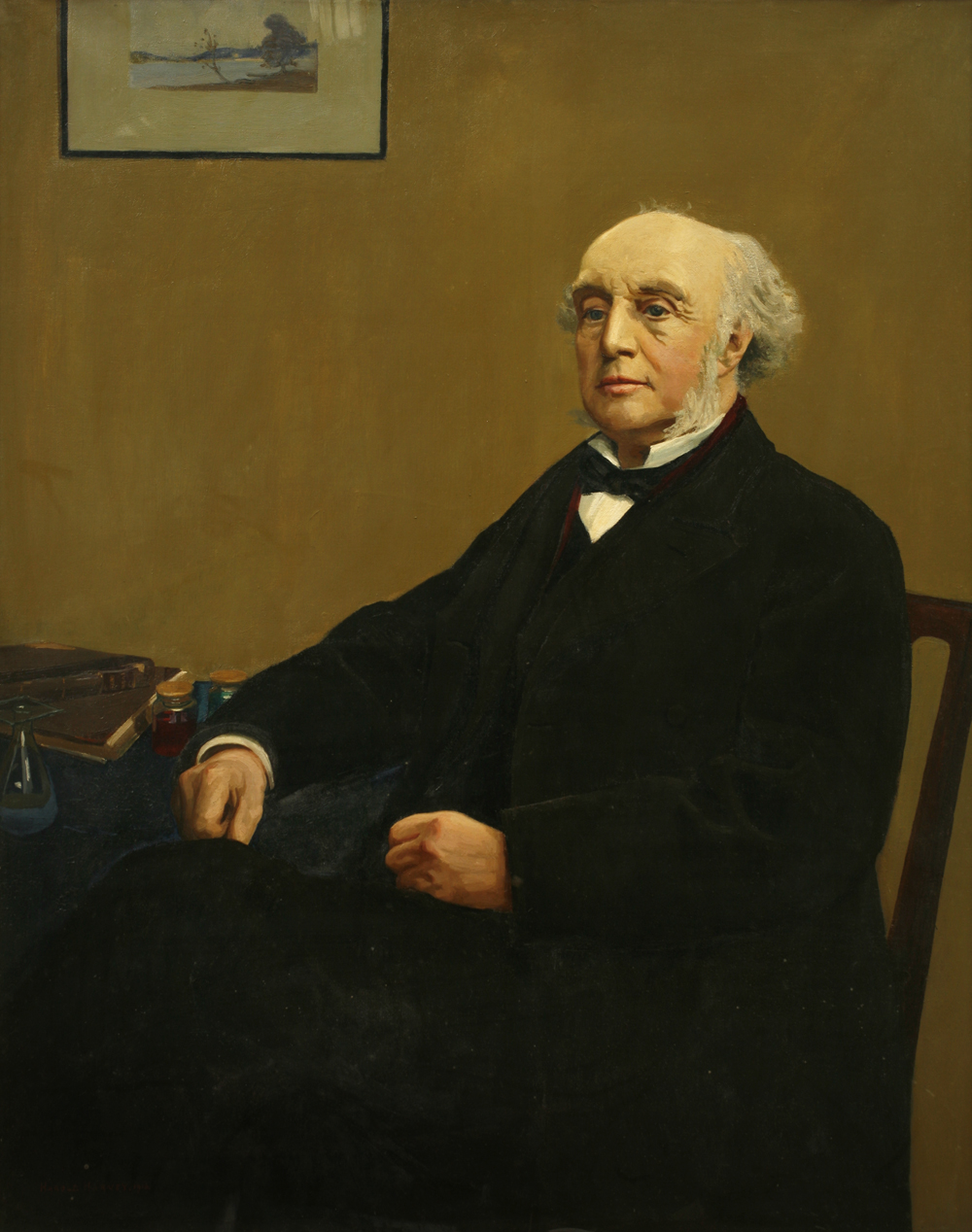
- Barham by Harold Harvey
- Born: 9 March 1804; Truro, Cornwall, England
- Died: 20 October 1884 (aged 80); Truro, Cornwall, England
- Resting place: Kenwyn, Cornwall, England
- Education: Queens' College, Cambridge
- Occupation: Physician
- Spouse: Caroline Carlyon (m.1839)
- Children: 7
- Parent(s): Mary Morton (Mother); Thomas Barham (Father)
- Relatives: William Barham (Brother); Thomas Barham (Brother); Francis Barham (Brother)

Charles Foster Barham, M.D. (9 March 1804 – 20 October 1884) was an English physician and the fourth son of Thomas Foster Barham.

== Early life and education ==
Barham was born in Truro. His family's wealth came from slavery and sugar estates in western Jamaica.

He was privately educated at several places in Cornwall and at Saffron Walden, proceeding from the latter town to Downing College, Cambridge, where he matriculated in October 1821. Within a few months he had migrated to Queens' College, where he became a foundation scholar in May 1823. The bent of his family was for medicine, and after studying at Edinburgh, as well as at Paris and in Italy, Barham took the degree of M.B. at Cambridge in 1827, qualifying for the higher degree of M.D. in 1860. For a few years he practised at Tavistock, but in August 1837 he settled at Truro, and remained there until his death.

== Career ==
In the following year he was appointed senior physician to the Royal Cornwall Infirmary, and when he resigned that post in 1873 was elected consulting physician. On his settlement at Truro Dr. Barham threw himself with energy into its political and civic life, and on 28 Sep 1839 became more closely identified with the town by his marriage to Caroline, the second daughter of Clement Carlyon, M.D., who belonged to an old Truro family. In all the proceedings of the Royal Institution of Cornwall Dr. Barham took an active part, and to its Reports and Journal he contributed many articles. From 1837 until 1859 he was its secretary, at which date he became its president. In 1856 he became a magistrate for Truro and in 1858 mayor. He served as consultant physician to the Truro Friendly Society, was also the president of the south-western branch of the British Medical Association for a time.

He died at Truro on 20 October 1884, leaving a large family behind him. He was buried at Kenwyn. His brother Francis Foster Barham was a religious writer.

Though Dr. Barham was interested in antiquarian and geological pursuits generally, the two subjects which had especial charm for him were the climate of Cornwall and the diseases of the miners who contributed to its wealth. The names of many papers written by him on these topics are enumerated in the Bibliotheca Cornubiensis, (vols. i. and iii). His services were engaged in 1842 by a commission on the employment of children, and his report, with the evidence which he collected, was printed in the first and second reports of the commission. He also wrote a Report on the Sanitary State of the Labouring Classes in the Town of Truro published in 1840.

== Selected publications ==
- Barham, C. (1842). "Report on the Sanitary State of the Labouring Classes in the Town of Truro". In: Local Reports on the Sanitary Condition of the Labouring Population of England. Presented to Both Houses of Parliament, by Command of Her Majesty, July 1842. pp. 16–35.
- —— (25 August 1860). "On climate, in some of its medical aspects. Addresses and Papers Read at the Twenty-Eighth Annual Meeting of the British Medical Association: Address in Medicine". The British Medical Journal: 659–661.
- —— (8 September 1860). "On climate, in some of its medical aspects. Address In Medicine (Concluded)". The British Medical Journal. 1 (193): 697–701. JSTOR 25196367. PMC 2252959.
- —— (24 August 1878). "Remarks on the Isles of Scilly as a Health-Resort". The British Medical Journal. 2 (921): 277–278. doi:10.1136/bmj.2.921.277. PMC 2221794. PMID 20748950.
