= List of honorary fellows of Emmanuel College, Cambridge =

This is a list of Honorary Fellows of Emmanuel College, Cambridge. A list of current honorary fellows is published in the Cambridge University Reporter, Special No. 2, 2015.

- Lawrence Bacow
- Peter Beckwith
- Derek Bok
- John Burland
- Peter Carnley
- Indrajit Coomaraswamy
- Geoffrey Crossick
- Gerald Davies
- David Drewry
- Andrew Fane
- Sebastian Faulks
- Drew Gilpin Faust
- Sir Leslie Fielding
- Sir Roderick Floud
- Michael Frayn
- Conor Gearty
- Jane Ginsburg
- Edith Heard
- Sir Geoffrey Hill
- William Lloyd Hoyt
- Sir Christopher Husbands
- Frank Kelly
- Dame Christina Lambert
- Dennis Lo
- John Lowden
- David Lowen
- Curtis T. McMullen
- John Meggitt
- Sir Eldryd Parry
- Andrew Petter
- Griff Rhys Jones
- Sue Rigby
- Sir Peter Rubin
- Neil L. Rudenstine
- Peter Slee
- Lawrence Summers
- Sir John Taylor
- Moira Wallace
