= Edward William Grinfield =

English biblical scholar (1785–1864)

- Born: 1785
- Died: 9 July 1864 (aged 78–79); Brighton, England
- Occupations: Biblical scholar and clergyman
- Parent(s): Thomas Grinfield and Anna Joanna (nee Barham)
- Religion: Christian (Anglican)
- Ordained: 1808
- Offices held: Minister of Laura Chapel, Bath

Edward William Grinfield (1785–1864) was an English biblical scholar.

== Life ==
He was the son of Thomas Grinfield and Anna Joanna, daughter of Joseph Foster Barham of Bedford, and brother of Thomas Grinfield. He was a schoolfellow of Thomas de Quincey at Wingfield, Wiltshire. He entered Lincoln College, Oxford, proceeded B.A. 1806, M.A. 1808, and was ordained in the same year by the Bishop of Lincoln.

After studying law at Lincoln's Inn and the Inner Temple, Grinfield became minister of Laura Chapel, Bath. It had been founded by Francis Randolph, its proprietor, in 1756. Later he moved to London, where he occasionally preached at Kensington.

In 1859 Grinfield founded and endowed a lectureship at Oxford on the Septuagint. He died at Brighton on 9 July 1864, and was buried in Hove churchyard.

== Works ==
Grinfield wrote many pamphlets, articles, and reviews, as an advocate of Anglican orthodoxy. His works are:

- ‘Reflections on the Connection of the British Government with the Protestant Religion,’ 1807.
- ‘The Crisis of Religion,’ 1811, and with ‘Strictures on Mr. Lancaster's System of Popular Education,’ 1812.
- ‘Reflections upon the Influence of Infidelity and Profaneness on Public Liberty, with a Plan for National Circulating Libraries,’ 1817.
- ‘Connection of Natural and Revealed Theology,’ 1818.
- ‘Cursory Observations upon the Lectures in Physiology, Zoology, and Natural History of Man, by Mr. Laurence,’ 2nd edition, 1819.
- ‘Sermons on the Parables,’ 1819.
- ‘The Researches of Physiology,’ 1820.
- ‘Thoughts on Lord Brougham's Education Bill,’ 1821.
- ‘Vindiciæ Anglicanæ, Letter to Dr. Copleston on his Inquiry into the Doctrine of Necessity and Predestination, with a second part,’ 1822.
- ‘Sermon on Paley's Exposition of the Law of Honour,’ 1824.
- ‘The Doctrinal Harmony of the New Testament,’ 1824.
- ‘A Reply to Mr. Brougham's Practical Observations upon the Education of the People,’ 1825.
- ‘The Nature and Extent of the Christian Dispensation with reference to the Salvability of the Heathen,’ 1827.
- ‘A Scriptural Inquiry into the Nature and Import of the Image and Likeness of God in Man,’ 1830.
- ‘Sketches of the Danish Mission on the Coast of Coromandel,’ 1831.
- ‘Christian Sentiments suggested by the Present Crisis; or, Civil Liberty founded upon Self-Restraint,’ 1831.
- ‘Reflections after a Visit to the University of Oxford,’ on the proceedings against Renn Dickson Hampden, 1836.
- 'The Chart and Scale of Truth,' 1840.
- 'Novum Testamentum Græcum. Editio Hellenistica,' 1843.
- 'Scholia Hellenistica in Novum Testamentum,' &c., 1848.
- 'An Expostulatory Letter to the Right Rev. Bishop Wiseman on the Interpolated Curse in the Vatican Septuagint,' 1850.
- 'An Apology for the Septuagint,' 1850.
- 'The Jesuits: an Historical Sketch,’ 1851, 1853.
- ‘The Christian Cosmos: the Son of God the revealed Creator,’ 1856.

== Grinfield Lecturers ==
- 1861–1862 Edward Halifax Hansell
- 1863–1865 John Day Collis
- 1865–1869 James Augustus Hessey
- 1869 William Kay
- 1871 Wharton Booth Marriott
- 1872–1874 Edward Hayes Plumptre
- 1876–1878 John Wordsworth
- 1882–1884 Edwin Hatch
- 1886–1890 Alfred Edersheim
- 1893, 1895–1897 Charles Henry Hamilton Wright
- 1901–1905 Henry Adeney Redpath
- 1905–1911 Robert Henry Charles
- 1920 Henry St. John Thackeray
- 1919–1921 George Buchanan Gray
- 1927–1931 Charles Harold Dodd
- 1935–1939 Godfrey Rolles Driver
- 1943–1945 Thomas Walter Manson
- 1945–1949 George Dunbar Kilpatrick
- 1961–1965 George Bradford Caird
- 1969–1973 Sidney Jellicoe
- 1996-1998 John Lowden
- 1998-2000 Eugene Ulrich
- 2005–2006 Tessa Rajak
- 2007–2008 Jennifer Dines
- 2009–2010 Anneli Aejmelaeus
- 2011–2012 John Lee
- 2013–2014 Nicholas De Lange
- 2020-2022 James K. Aitken

== Sources ==
This article incorporates text from a publication now in the public domain: "Grinfield, Edward William". Dictionary of National Biography. London: Smith, Elder & Co. 1885–1900.
