= HMC Projects in Central and Eastern Europe =

- Founded: May 1992
- Founder: Robin Schlich, Roger Wicks
- Type: Private company limited by guarantee
- Registration no.: 1074491
- Purpose: Education, Equality
- Location: 12 The Point, Rockingham Road, Market Harborough, LE16 7QU, UK
- Coordinates: 52.484171°N 0.897181°W
- Region served: 14 Countries in Central and Eastern Europe
- Method: For students: A scholarship to study in a private school for an academic year. For teachers: An assistant teacher position in a private school for an academic year.
- Website: Official homepage
- Formerly called: HMC Foreign Students Fund

HMC Projects in Central and Eastern Europe is a registered charity and a company limited by guarantee operating from the UK. It offers opportunities for students and teachers from 14 Central and Eastern European countries to respectively either study or teach in a British private school for an academic year.

== History ==
=== Call to Action by Robin Schlich ===
In the spring 1992 Conference & Common Room an article was published about schools forging individual links with countries in Central and Eastern Europe. This inspired Robin Schlich to call for a formation of a committee, so no countries would go under- or over-represented. On 5 October 1992 the first meeting of the committee was held in HMC offices in Leicester, with Roger Wicks as the chairman and Robin Schlich as the secretary. Also, in that September the first two students from Czechoslovakia came to the UK.

=== First alumni ===
In September 1993 the first official HMC scholars came to United Kingdom as part of the students' scholarship scheme. In that year students came from seven countries: Bulgaria, Czech Republic, Hungary, Latvia, Lithuania, Romania and Slovakia. In 1994 Croatia, Macedonia, Moldova, Mongolia, Poland and Yugoslavia followed. Rest of the countries have joined during the following years.

=== Foundation of Teachers Scheme ===
In 1996 a scheme for young teachers from Eastern and Central Europe was also set up. It was soon approved by the British Council and UK Border Agency. Since 1996 more than 300 teachers have joined British independent schools for a year.

== Member countries ==
Currently the project consists of 14 countries in central and eastern Europe: Armenia, Bosnia and Herzegovina, Bulgaria, Croatia, Czech Republic, Latvia, Georgia, Moldova, Montenegro, North Macedonia, Romania, Serbia, Slovakia and Ukraine. Hungary only takes part in the teachers' scheme.

== Participating schools ==
The project has sent students to almost 100 schools. The project mainly consists of public schools, but also includes some academies, like Wymondham College. During the years, some international schools have also taken part: Aiglon College in Switzerland, British School in Brussels, Salem Castle School in Germany and Bromsgrove International School in Thailand.

== Notable alumni ==
Doina Cebotari - General Secretary of Washington European Society, Advisor to the Prime Minister of Moldova
Răzvan Orăşanu - former Senior Advisor on Economic Affairs for the Prime Minister of Romania
