= Mount Haven =

Mount Haven may refer to:

- Haven Mountain, a mountain in Oates Land, Antarctica
- Mount Haven Hotel, a hotel in Marazion, Cornwall, England, UK

== See also ==
- Haven (disambiguation)
- Haven Hill, a hill in Ross Dependency, Antarctica
