= Isaiah Burnell =

British-composer (born 1871)

Isaiah Burnell (1871–1951) was a British music teacher and composer whose musical activities were mostly centred around his adopted home town of Bromsgrove, Worcestershire.

Burnell was born in Yorkshire. He become a member of the Royal College of Organists at the age of 18. By the turn of the century he was living and working in Bromsgrove, where he stayed for the following fifty years until his death. He was Director of Music and mathematics at Bromsgrove School from 1907 for 25 years and musical director and conductor of the Bromsgrove Musical Club.

Burnell began corresponding with Edward Elgar from 1914 and on several occasions Elgar attended concerts organized by him. Burnell put on performances of Elgar's Caractacus in 1914 and King Olaf in 1929 at the Bromsgrove Town Hall. Adrian Boult conducted a piece by Burnell with the City of Birmingham Orchestra in 1928.

His compositions include the Passiontide cantata For Us Men (1939) for soloists, chorus and organ, advertised by his publishers Novello as an alternative to John Stainer's Crucifixion, and written in much the same simple, popular and direct style. His best known work was the anthem Surely the Lord is in this place, written for the dedication of Bromsgrove School's Memorial Chapel in May 1931.

An archive collection of manuscripts and letters was sold by John Wilson Manuscripts in 2006.

== Selected works ==
- Concert overture in G major
- Gather ye Rosebuds, choral setting (1930), published H F W Deans
- The Gay Cavalier, quick march for brass band
- Elegy for orchestra
- England, choral, text Mary Cowden Clarke
- For Us Men, Passiontide cantata (1939), published Novello
- Magnificat and Nunc Dimittis, choral
- Meditation in F, for organ
- Minuet and Trio for strings
- Overture in E minor for orchestra
- Piano Trio on G
- Psalm XXIII, choral
- The Sands of Dee, choral partsong, published Novello
- Scherzo for orchestra
- Six short pieces for piano
- Suite for Brass Band (1935)
- Surely the Lord is in this place, choral anthem (1931), published Novello
