= Marazion =

Town in south-west Cornwall, England

Coordinates: 50.125°N 5.476°W

Marazion: Cornish: Marghasyow
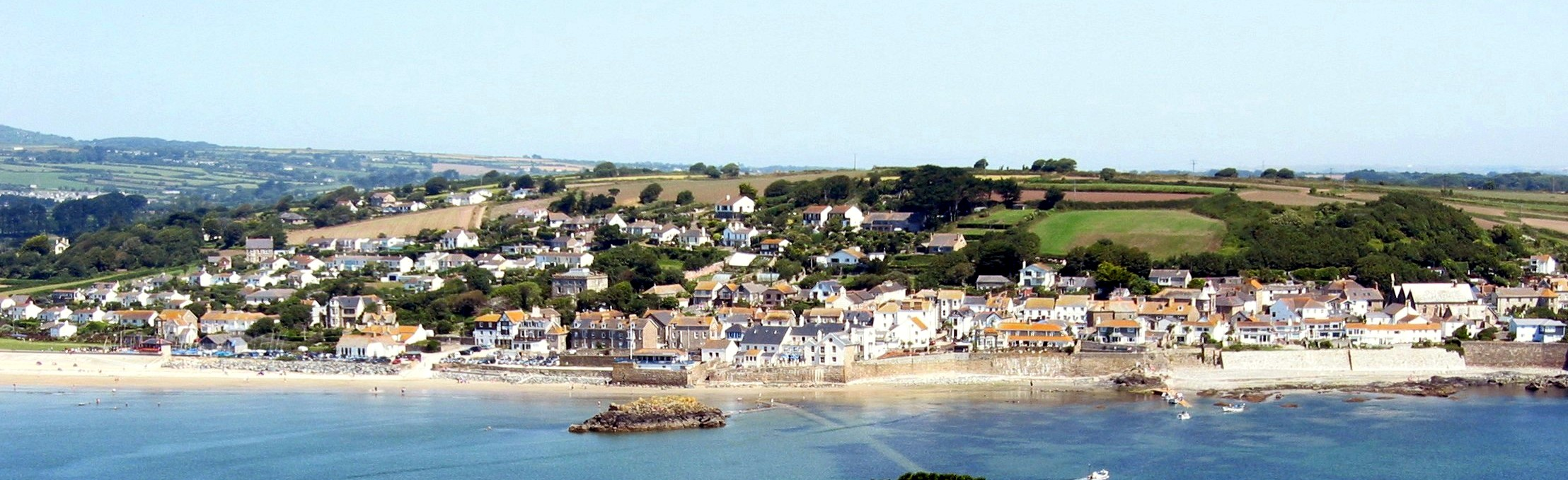
- The town, seen from St Michael's Mount

- Location within Cornwall
- Population: 1,483 (Parish, 2021); (Note: To get individual parish data, use the query function on table PP002.); 1,326 (Built up area, 2021) (Note: To get data for individual built-up areas, query the 'Population Estimates / Projections' dataset, then the 'Small area (2021 based) by single year of age - England and Wales' and then choose '2022 built-up areas' for the geography.)
- OS grid reference: SW523306
- Civil parish: Marazion
- Unitary authority: Cornwall
- Ceremonial county: Cornwall
- Region: South West
- Country: England
- Sovereign state: United Kingdom
- Post town: MARAZION
- Postcode district: TR17
- Dialling code: 01736
- Police: Devon and Cornwall
- Fire: Cornwall
- Ambulance: South Western
- UK Parliament: St Ives

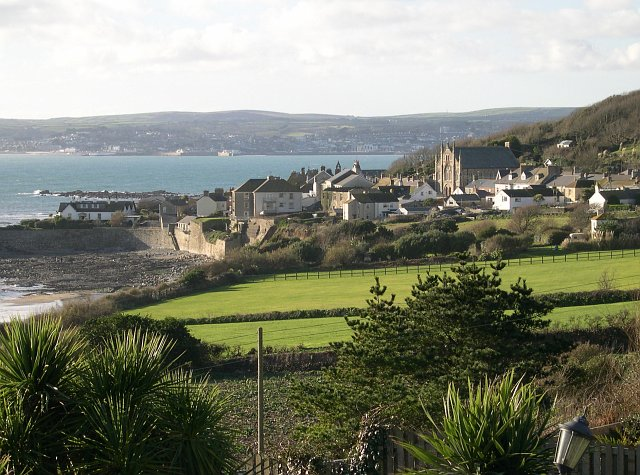
A view of the town from the east

Marazion (/mærəˈzaɪən/; Cornish: Marghasyow [marˈxazjɔʊ], meaning Thursday market) is a town and civil parish on the shore of Mount's Bay, in Cornwall, England. It lies 2 miles (3.2 km) east of Penzance and the tidal island of St Michael's Mount is half-a-mile offshore. At low water, a causeway links it to the town; at high water, passenger boats carry visitors between Marazion and St Michael's Mount. Marazion is a tourist resort, with an active community of artists who produce and sell paintings and pottery in the town's art galleries.

The town lies within the Cornwall Area of Outstanding Natural Beauty (AONB). On the western side of the town is Marazion Marsh, an RSPB reserve and a Site of Special Scientific Interest (SSSI). At the 2021 census, the population of the parish was 1,483 and the built-up area was 1,326.

== History ==
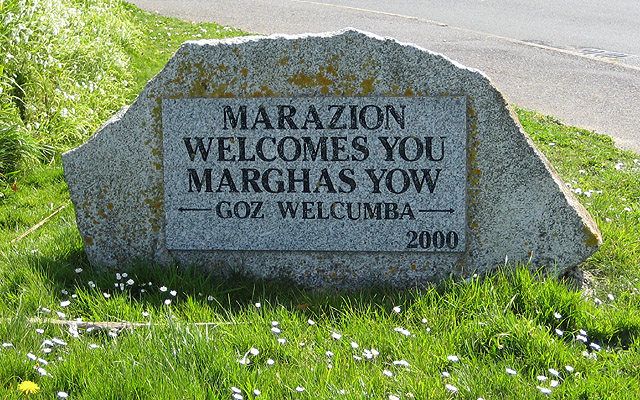
The Cornish language welcome sign

Remains of an ancient bronze furnace, discovered near the town, tend to prove that tin smelting was practised here at an early period. Marazion was not recorded in the Domesday Book of 1088.

=== Medieval history ===
A late 11th century charter attributed to Robert, Count of Mortain, granted lands and liberties to St Michael's Mount, including the right to hold a market on Thursdays. Although the charter was granted to St Michael's Mount, the market appears to have always been held on the mainland opposite the island. This market appears to be the origin of the name Marazion, coming from Marghasbighan (Parvum Forum, lit. "small marketplace") of the earlier charters and the Marghasyewe (Cornish: "Thursday Market") or Marketjew (Forum Jovis) of the later charters. It may be added that a Jewish origin has been erroneously ascribed to the place from the name Marketjew.

Richard, Earl of Cornwall, granted a further market charter in 1257, which provided that the three fairs, on the two feasts of St Michael and at Mid-Lent, and the three markets which had hitherto been held by the priors of St Michael's Mount on land not their own at Marghasbighan, should in future be held on their own land at Marchadyou. He transferred in fact the fairs and markets from the demesne lands of the Bloyous in Marazion to those of the prior.

To remedy the loss incurred by this measure, Ralph Bloyou procured for himself and his heirs a market on Mondays and a fair on the vigil, feast, and morrow of St Andrew at Marghasyon in 1331. In Leland's time, the market was held at Marhasdeythyow (Forum Jovis); both Norden (1582) and Carew (1602) tell us that Marcajewe signifies the Thursday's market, which, whether etymologically sound or not, shows that the prior's market had prevailed over its rival.

Marazion was once a flourishing town, owing its prosperity to the throng of pilgrims who came to visit St Michael's Mount, but it largely ceased to be a place of pilgrimage at the Reformation. During the first half of the 16th century, Marazion was twice plundered; first by the French in 1513 and later by Cornish rebels in 1549.

=== Modern history ===
In 1595, Elizabeth I granted Marazion its own charter of incorporation, making it a borough. This ratified the grant of St Andrew's fair, provided for another on the Feast of St Barnabas and established a market on Saturdays. The corporation established by the 1595 charter consisted of a mayor, eight aldermen and twelve capital burgesses. Of the fairs, only the Michaelmas fair has survived and all the markets have gone.

The borough of Marazion briefly served as a constituency during the Commonwealth period in the 1650s, with the right to return two members of parliament. Richard Myll and Thomas Westlake were elected in 1658, but the inhabitants petitioned against them taking their seats because they were unable to pay expenses for their attendance.

The A394 road between Marazion, Helston and Penryn was once run by Helston Turnpike Roads Trust, which charged tolls for using the road. On 1 November 1880, the Trust put the toll houses at Marazion and Wendron up for auction, as well as ″materials″ such as granite posts, chains and gates. The charging of tolls ended on 7 November 1880 and the road came under the management of the County. (Note: Cornwall County Council was not formed until 1889.)

The Penwith area, which includes Marazion, was one of the last areas where the Cornish language survived as the vernacular language of the population, but the number of native speakers gradually diminished as the population adopted the English language. A John Nancarrow from Marazion, who survived into the 1790s, was said to be one of the last known native speakers of Cornish.

The West Cornwall Railway opened Marazion railway station on 11 March 1852 and its goods yard handled a large volume of perishable traffic, including fish, fruit, and vegetables, from the surrounding farms and harbours. Marazion station closed to passenger traffic in October 1964 and to freight in December 1965. For many years, the site of the closed station was home to Pullman railway carriages which were used as camping coaches. The site, though not conveniently located, lies on the Cornish Main Line, so there are aspirations to reopen it.

The Royal National Lifeboat Institution opened Marazion Lifeboat Station in 1990, although the D-class (EA16) inshore lifeboat was actually kept in a shed on the quayside on St Michael's Mount. The station was closed on 31 October 2001, as it was proving difficult to find enough volunteer crew members. The boat was transferred to the neighbouring Penlee Lifeboat Station at Newlyn on the other side of Mounts Bay where there is a larger population to draw the crews from.

At the end of the Second World War, a number of naval vessels, including the battleship HMS Warspite, were broken up on the beaches at Marazion. HMS Warspite was beached and broken up in 1947.

In 2021, the town received a brief spike in publicity after submitting itself in a competition for city status held as part of the Platinum Jubilee of Elizabeth II. Marazion subsequently withdrew from the competition after the government decided the bid needed the support of Cornwall Council to proceed, which it did not have.

In March 2026, it was reported that the town had applied to become the first UK Town of Culture in 2028.

== Governance ==
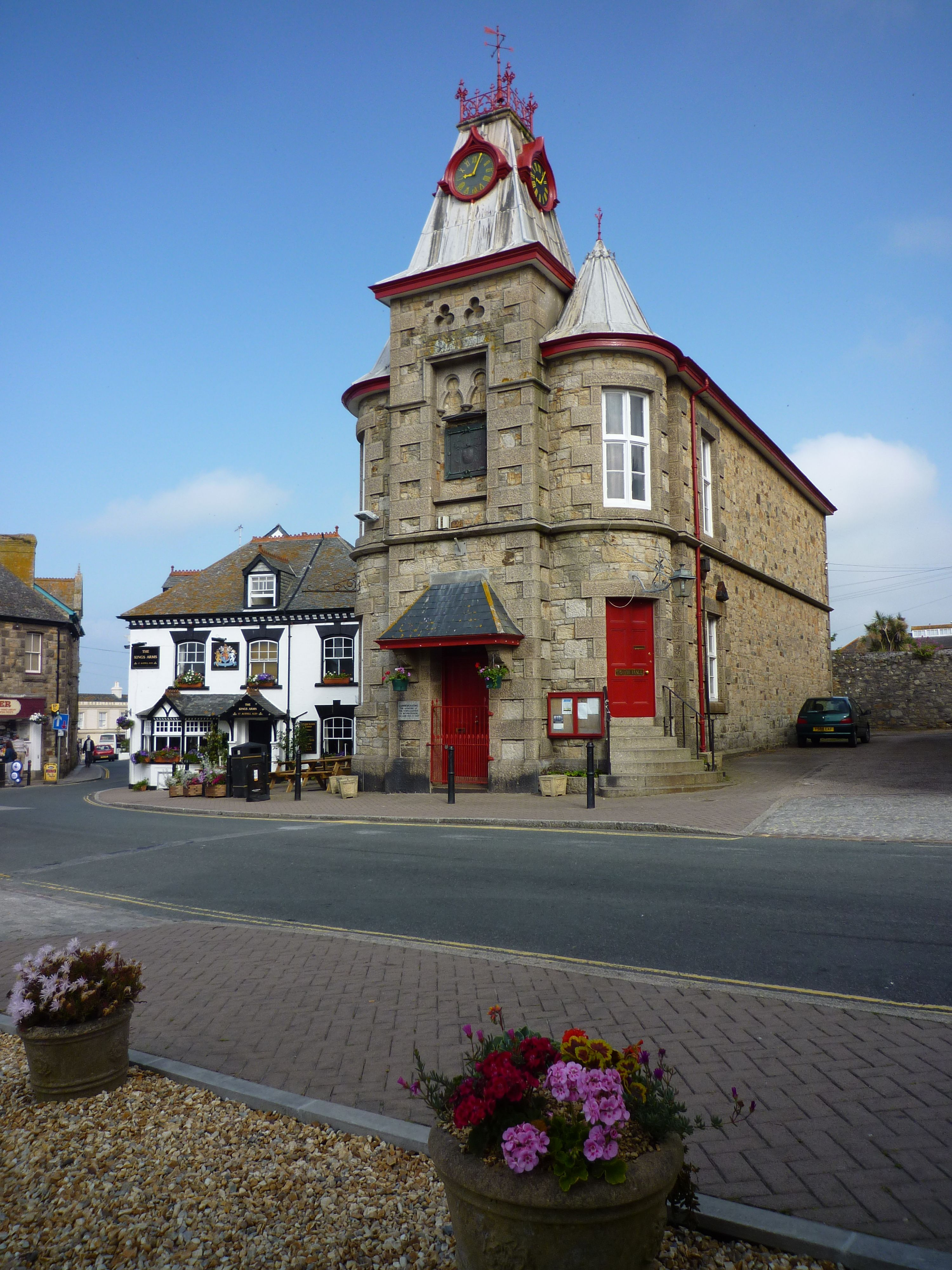
The town hall

There are two tiers of local government covering Marazion, at parish (town) and unitary authority level: Marazion Town Council and Cornwall Council. The town council is based at Marazion Town Hall, in the Market Place, which was built in 1871.

=== Administrative history ===
Marazion historically formed part of the ancient parish of St Hilary in the Penwith Hundred of Cornwall. Marazion was incorporated as a borough in 1595. Parish functions under the poor laws were then exercised separately for Marazion borough and the rest of St Hilary parish.

Marazion therefore became a separate civil parish in 1866 when the legal definition of 'parish' was changed to be the areas used for administering the poor laws. It remained part of the ecclesiastical parish of St Hilary until 1893.

The seal of the borough of Marazion was "On a shield the arms three castles triple turreted", with the legend Semper Eadem.

A government survey of boroughs in 1835 concluded that Marazion was too small to be reformed into the new style of municipal borough being introduced under the Municipal Corporations Act 1835. Marazion's borough corporation continued to exist, but it was ineligible to take on any new local government functions. By the mid-19th century, the corporation had stopped appointing its own constables and no longer held its own courts, with the functions it continued to operate largely being reduced to running the market and managing certain properties it owned. Such unreformed boroughs were eventually abolished in 1886 under the Municipal Corporations Act 1883. Following the dissolution of the borough in 1886, the borough corporation's property and rights and the civic regalia were transferred to a trust.

When elected, parish and district councils were established under the Local Government Act 1894, Marazion was given a parish council and included in the West Penwith Rural District.

West Penwith Rural District was abolished in 1974 under the Local Government Act 1972, when the area became part of the Penwith district. As part of the 1974 reforms, parish councils were given the right to declare their parishes to be a town, allowing them to take the title of town council and giving the title of mayor to the council's chairperson. Marazion Parish Council exercised this right, becoming Marazion Town Council.

Penwith district was abolished in 2009. Cornwall County Council then took on district-level functions, making it a unitary authority, and was renamed Cornwall Council.

== Architecture ==
The current edition of The Buildings of England comments that Marazion "retains the authentic ambience of an ancient town...occasionally enlivened by an engaging fashion for castles and Gothic" in the design of some nineteenth-century buildings. However, lack of first-rank notable or historic buildings led Nikolaus Pevsner to omit the town entirely from the first edition; in the second edition, Marazion is described as "attractive as a whole" and he says of the area near the ferry port: the "cobbled pavements and old houses .. give a look of Lyme Regis to the old centre". Nevertheless, several notable buildings lie in the eastern part of Marazion, including Chymorvah House and the Mount Haven Hotel next to it, once one of the most haunted hotels in Cornwall, with views of the mount from its terrace. Also of note are Marazion Town Hall (also a museum), the Marazion War Memorial and The Godolphin Arms.

The Old Manor House on Fore Street is a Grade II listed building. The Listing states that it was built circa 1775 for William Cornish a former mayor; extensions were added in the mid 19th century at the rear and the east side of the building. During an unstated number of years in the 1800s, this was the home of noted architect James Piers St Aubyn. It was more recently owned by the fashion designer, Jeff Banks. The property was listed for sale in 2019. The listing report stated that the house included "original slate floors, open fireplaces, sash windows, exposed beams, intricate cornices and wood panelling" and featured views of St Michael's Mount.

Pevsner mentions one grand Georgian house at the west end of the town. This is known as the Rookery or Manor Office and was built from 1775 onwards for Marazion merchant John Blewett, but was incomplete when he died in 1777. It is also a Grade II listed building.

=== Churches ===
The original parish church is at St Hilary. In Marazion, there was a chapel of ease dedicated to St Hermes, recorded in 1308; by 1735, it had become ruinous and was rebuilt. In 1861 a new church (dedicated to All Saints) was built on the same site which became a parish church in 1893. The architect was J. P. St Aubyn. The Ebenezer (Free Methodist Church) chapel at the west end of the town is a classical revival building of 1862 with galleries, Grade II listed and now turned into private dwellings. The Grade II listed Wesleyan Methodist Church on Fore Street was built 1893-1895 and replaced the earlier (1811) Wesleyan chapel across the road, which was sold following storm damage and demolished to make way for private dwellings. The Friends Meeting House on Beacon Road dates from c.1688 (with limited remodelling 1742 and circa 1880) and is a classic simple Quaker meeting house still in use today.

== Media ==
Local TV coverage is provided by BBC South West and ITV West Country. Television signals are received from the Redruth TV transmitter and one of the two local relay transmitters (Gulval and Alverton).

Local radio stations are BBC Radio Cornwall on 103.9 FM, Heart West on 107.0 FM, Pirate FM on 102.8 FM and Coast FM (formerly Penwith Radio), a community-based station which broadcasts on 96.5 and 97.2 FM.

The town is served by the local newspaper, The Cornishman.

== Sport ==
Burgee of Mount's Bay Sailing Club, based in Marazion

Marazion Blues was an association football team, founded in 1906; it was disbanded in 2017 due to a lack of players. They were members of the Cornwall Combination League from 1961 to 2004, twice champions in 1978 and 1980, and cup winners in 1972 and 1979. The Blues restarted in July 2018 and will play in the Trelawny League.

The RNLI operates a seasonal lifeguard service at Marazion every summer, with a dedicated swimming area.

Cornish wrestling tournaments were held in Marazion, at the Rookery Gardens, Marazion Green and in the field adjoining Marazion Bridge.

== Notable people ==
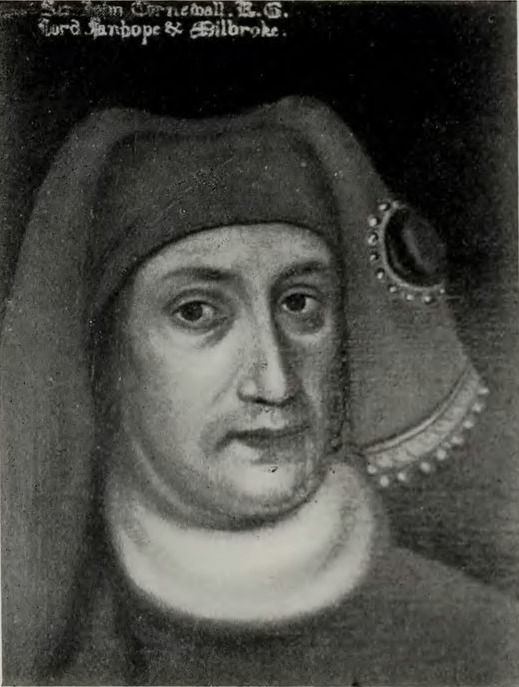
John Cornwall, 1st Baron Fanhope

- John Cornwall, 1st Baron Fanhope (c.1364–1443), nobleman and soldier and a well respected chivalric figure of his era.
- Pascoe Grenfell (1761–1838), businessman and politician.
- Henry Clutterbuck M.D. (1767–1856), an English medical writer.
- Captain Sir Christopher Cole (1770–1836), Royal Navy officer who served in the American Revolutionary War, the French Revolutionary Wars and the Napoleonic Wars.
- William Foster Barham (1802–1845), an English poet.
- Pascoe Grenfell Hill (1804–1882), a priest in the Church of England and an author.
- Admiral Sir "Sandy" Woodward (1932–2013), a senior Royal Navy officer who commanded the Task Force of the Falklands War.
