= Clement Carlyon =

English physician

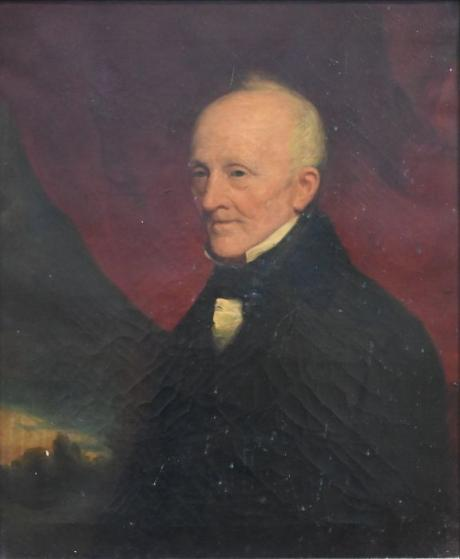
- Born: 14 April 1777
- Died: 5 March 1864 (aged 86)
- Occupation: Physician

Clement Carlyon (14 April 1777 – 5 March 1864) was an English physician.

== Biography ==
Carlyon was born at Truro on 14 April 1777, son of the Rev John Carlyon, Rector of St. Mary's Truro and his wife Mary née Winstanley, of Braunstone Hall. He was educated at the grammar school, where Davy and Henry Martyn were among his schoolfellows. Having taken his degree at Pembroke College, Cambridge, he was appointed a travelling bachelor on the Worts foundation, and, proceeding to Germany, formed the acquaintance with Samuel Taylor Coleridge for which, apart from his merely local celebrity, he is now principally remembered. After completing his medical studies at Edinburgh and London, he settled in his native town, where he spent a long life of active beneficence. He was five times mayor of Truro, and was chiefly instrumental in the erection of the handsome memorial to Richard Lander, which is so great an ornament to the town. His autobiography, published under the title of 'Early Years and Late Reflections,' in 4 vols., between 1836 and 1858, is in parts exceedingly tedious, but is valuable for the numerous interesting particulars of Coleridge, Davy, and other men of eminence known to the writer. His 'Observations on the Endemic Typhus Fever of Cornwall' (1827) are esteemed, and effected much good in a sanitary point of view. He edited Luigi Cornaro and Bernard Gilpin, and wrote several tracts on religious subjects. He died on 5 March 1864.

== Marriage and family ==
He married, on 22 April 1806 to his first cousin, Eliza, daughter of Thomas Carlyon of Tregrehan. In doing so sacrificing his fellowship.

They had 8 children together:

- Emily Carlyon (1808–1891). Married her cousin, Rev Thomas Stackhouse Carlyon, Rector of Glenfield, Leicestershire
- Clement Winstanley Carlyon (1810–1888). Rector of St Just in Roseland.
- Caroline Carlyon (1811–1892). Married Charles Foster Barham.
- Harriet Carlyon (1813–1886)
- Frederick Carlyon (1815–1897). First Anglican Rector of Stellenbosch. Later Rector of Leverington.
- Edward Trewbody Carlyon (1817–1891). A solicitor in Truro.
- Elizabeth Carlyon (1819–1906). Married Harold Browne, Bishop of Winchester.
- Octavia Mary (1823–1871). Married Richard Baxter, a barrister.
