= S. J. Goldsmith =

Lithuanian writer and journalist

- Born: 18 April 1910; Jonava, Lithuania
- Died: 18 January 1995 (aged 84)
- Education: Vytautas Magnus University, Kaunas, Lithuania
- Occupations: Journalist, author, editor
- Spouse: Sonia Minsky
- Children: Tessa Rajak
- Writing career
- Language: Hebrew, English, Yiddish

S. J. Goldsmith (Hebrew: שמואל יוסף גולדשמידט; born Shmuel Yosef Goldshmidt; 18 April 1910 (Note: His obituary in The Times gives his date of birth as 18 April 1910.) – 18 January 1995), also known as Sam Goldsmith, was a journalist, author, and editor of Lithuanian Jewish heritage in the European Jewish press and English press.

== Early life and education ==
Goldsmith was born in Jonava, Lithuania, on April 18, 1910. He graduated from Schwabe Hebrew Gymnasium and Vytautas Magnus University in Kaunas.

His early career was in the Jewish press of Eastern Europe, writing for the daily Yiddishe Shtimme. From 1934 to 1939, he wrote for Hayntike Nayes (Today's News), the paper's evening edition, becoming its editor in 1933. He relocated to London in 1939.

== In England ==
From 1939, he reported and wrote op-eds for the Hebrew daily newspaper HaBoker in Tel Aviv, and for the British Sunday paper Reynold's News. As a British war correspondent he was the first journalist to enter the Bergen-Belsen camp after liberation and among the first in Dachau. He covered the Belsen Trial in Lüneburg (1945) and the Nuremberg Trials (1945-6) as a British war-correspondent.

Between 1958 and 1975 he served as European editor for the Jewish Telegraphic Agency. He was a prolific freelance contributor to various newspapers and journals, in several languages. During 1975–82, he wrote features for The Times, introducing aspects of Jewish ideas, culture, and politics to the British public. Among the causes he promoted were Hebrew language education in the Diaspora with the fostering of bilingualism, the rights of Soviet Jewry (during the eighties).

He was a founding member and chairman of the London branch of the World Hebrew Union. He was also well-known as an expert in its classic Yiddish language and literature. He was one of the speakers at the fifth European Conference on Yiddish culture which took place in London in 1966.

== Bibliography ==
=== Books ===
Goldsmith published books in both English and Hebrew, including five collections of essays. His works include:

- Twenty 20th Century Jews. Shengold Publishers. 1962. Library of Congress catalogue no 62-21943
- חצי מיליון יהודים בערפל: יהודי בריטניה [Half a Million Jews in the Fog: The Jews of Great Britain] (in Hebrew). Tel Aviv: World Jewish Congress Yiddish Committee. 1963.
- Jews in Transition. Wentworth Book Company. 1969. ISBN 978-0901418005.
- In the Passage of Time. Culmus Publishing. 1978.
- Goldsmith, Samuel Joseph (1984). The Slaughter of Sacred Cows. London. ISBN 978-0946999002.
- The Edge of the Conflagration: Essays in Disapproval. Janus. 1992. ISBN 978-1857560268.

=== As editor ===
- Goldsmith, S.J., ed. (1988). Britain in the Eye of the World: The Foreign Press Association in London, 1888-1988. London: Foreign Press Association. ISBN 9780905734019..
- Goldsmith, S.J., ed. (1978). Joseph Leftwich at eighty-five: A collective evaluation. World Jewish Congress Yiddish committee.

== Personal life ==
He married Sonia Minsky, economist and teacher, in Kaunas in 1939, and they have one daughter, the British ancient historian, Professor Tessa Rajak.

== Sources ==
- Obituary, The Times, 11 Feb 1995
- Obituary, The Daily Telegraph, 3 Feb 1995
- Obituary, The Jewish Chronicle, 21 Feb 1995
- Obituary, The Hampstead and Highgate Express, 27 Jan 1995
