= William Kay (scholar) =

English cleric and academic

William Kay (1820–1886) was an English cleric and academic, known as a college head and biblical scholar.

== Life ==
The youngest of nine children of Thomas and Ann Kay of Knaresborough, he was born on the 8th of April 1820, at Pickering, North Yorkshire. He passed two years at Giggleswick school, and, together with James Fraser, gained an open scholarship at Lincoln College, Oxford, on 15 March 1836. He graduated in 1839 with a first class in classics and a second in mathematics. He was elected as a fellow of his college 22 October 1840, and in 1842 and was appointed one of the tutors, proceeded M.A., and was elected Pusey and Ellerton Hebrew scholar.

Kay took holy orders in 1843, and in 1849, after proceeding B.D., he went out to India as principal of Bishop’s College, Calcutta. In 1855, he paid his only visit to England while principal of Bishop's College, and proceeded D.D. at Oxford. In 1864, he resigned his post at Calcutta and returned to Oxford.

In 1865 Kay was made select preacher before the university, and in 1866 was presented by his college to the rectory of Great Leighs, Essex, where he remained for the rest of his life. He was appointed Grinfield lecturer in 1869, was an honorary canon of St Albans Cathedral, and one of the bishop's chaplains.

Kay died on 18 January 1886, after much suffering. He was unmarried, and had for many years lived the life of a recluse, dividing his time between his biblical studies and the care of his parish.

== Works ==
In Calcutta Kay published several pieces at the college press, including his translation of the Psalms with notes, 1864 (3rd edit., enlarged and improved, London, 1877). One of the Old Testament revisers in 1870, he was notably conservative in his criticism, and contributed to the Speaker's Bible commentaries on the Book of Isaiah (1875) and the Epistle to the Hebrews (1881). He also furnished the notes on Ezekiel in the commentary published by the Christian Knowledge Society.

Kay wrote also:

- Crisis Hupfeldiana; being an examination of Hupfeld's criticism on Genesis, as recently set forth in Bishop Colenso's fifth part [of The Pentateuch and Book of Joshua critically examined], Oxford and London, 1865.
- A Sermon on the Unity of the Church, London, 1866; translated into Italian, London, 1868.
- The Greek text of St. Paul's two Epistles to the Corinthians, with an English Commentary, published after his death, London, 1887, edited by the Rev. John Slatter.

Kay also translated and edited one of the volumes of Claude Fleury's Ecclesiastical History, under the superintendence of John Henry Newman, Oxford, 1844.

== Notes ==
Attribution

This article incorporates text from a publication now in the public domain: Lee, Sidney, ed. (1892). "Kay, William". Dictionary of National Biography. Vol. 30. London: Smith, Elder & Co.
