= The Godolphin Arms, Marazion =

Pub and hotel in Marazion, Cornwall, UK

The Godolphin Arms
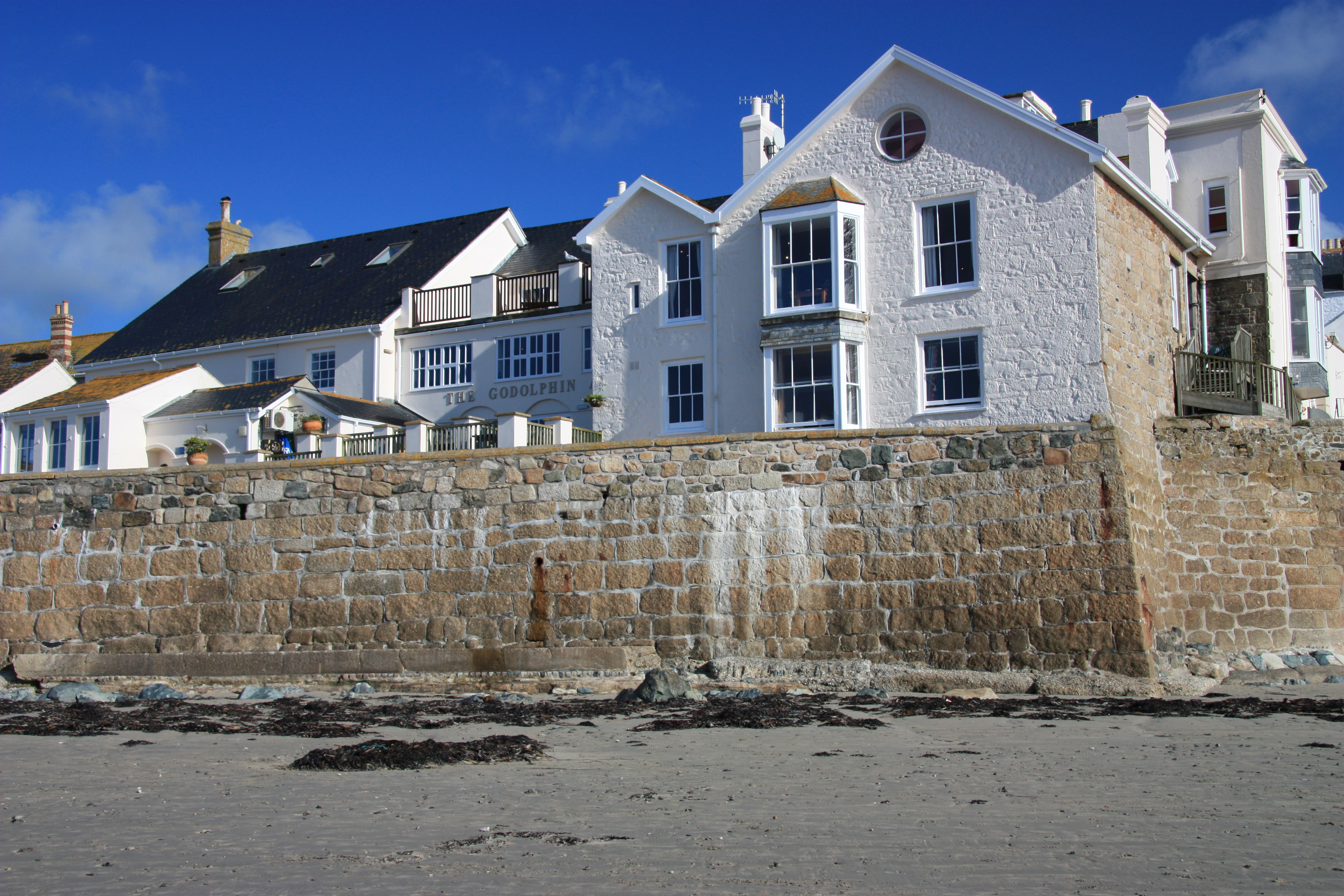
- Godolphin Arms, Marazion, seen from beach in 2008

- Location within Cornwall
- 50.123404°N 5.474466°W
- Location: Marazion, Cornwall

Site notes
- Website: thegodolphin.com

Listed Building – Grade II
- Official name: The Godolphin Arms
- Designated: 9 October 1987
- Reference no.: 1160423

The Godolphin Arms is a pub and hotel in Marazion, Cornwall, UK, located overlooking Marazion beach and St Michael's Mount. It is a grade II listed building. It has been run by St Austell Brewery since 2025.
