= Frank Bernard Wearne =

English Victoria Cross recipient (1894-1917)

- Born: 1 March 1894; Kensington, London
- Died: 28 June 1917 (aged 23) near Loos-en-Gohelle, France
- Military career
- Allegiance: United Kingdom
- Branch: British Army
- Rank: Second lieutenant
- Units: Essex Regiment
- Conflicts: World War I †
- Awards: Victoria Cross

Frank Bernard Wearne VC (1 March 1894 – 28 June 1917) was an English recipient of the Victoria Cross, the highest and most prestigious award for gallantry in the face of the enemy that can be awarded to British and Commonwealth forces.

== Details ==
Wearne was born to Frank and Ada (Morris) Wearne, the third of their five children. One of his brothers, Captain Keith Morris Wearne (1892–1917), was another casualty of World War I, falling in the Battle of Arras on 21 May 1917, aged 24. His only sister, Edith Ann (1889–1956), married Thomas Clinton Pears (1882–1912), a great great grandson of soap manufacturer Andrew Pears. Thomas and Edith were passengers on the RMS Titanic. Edith survived while Thomas was lost.

Before joining the British Army he attended Bromsgrove School. Wearne was 23 years old, and a second lieutenant in the 3rd Battalion, Essex Regiment, British Army, attached to the 10th Battalion during the Great War when the following deed took place for which he was awarded the VC.

On 28 June 1917 east of Loos, France, Second Lieutenant Wearne, commanding a small party in a raid on the enemy's trenches, had gained his objective in the face of fierce opposition and managed to maintain his position against repeated counter-attacks. Then, realising that if the left flank was lost his men would have to give way, he leaped onto the parapet and followed by his left section, ran along the top of the trench firing and throwing bombs. While doing this he was severely wounded, but continued directing operations until he received two more wounds, the second mortal.

== Sources ==
- Monuments to Courage (David Harvey, 1999)
- The Register of the Victoria Cross (This England, 1997)
