= Marazion Town Hall =

Municipal building in Marazion, Cornwall, England

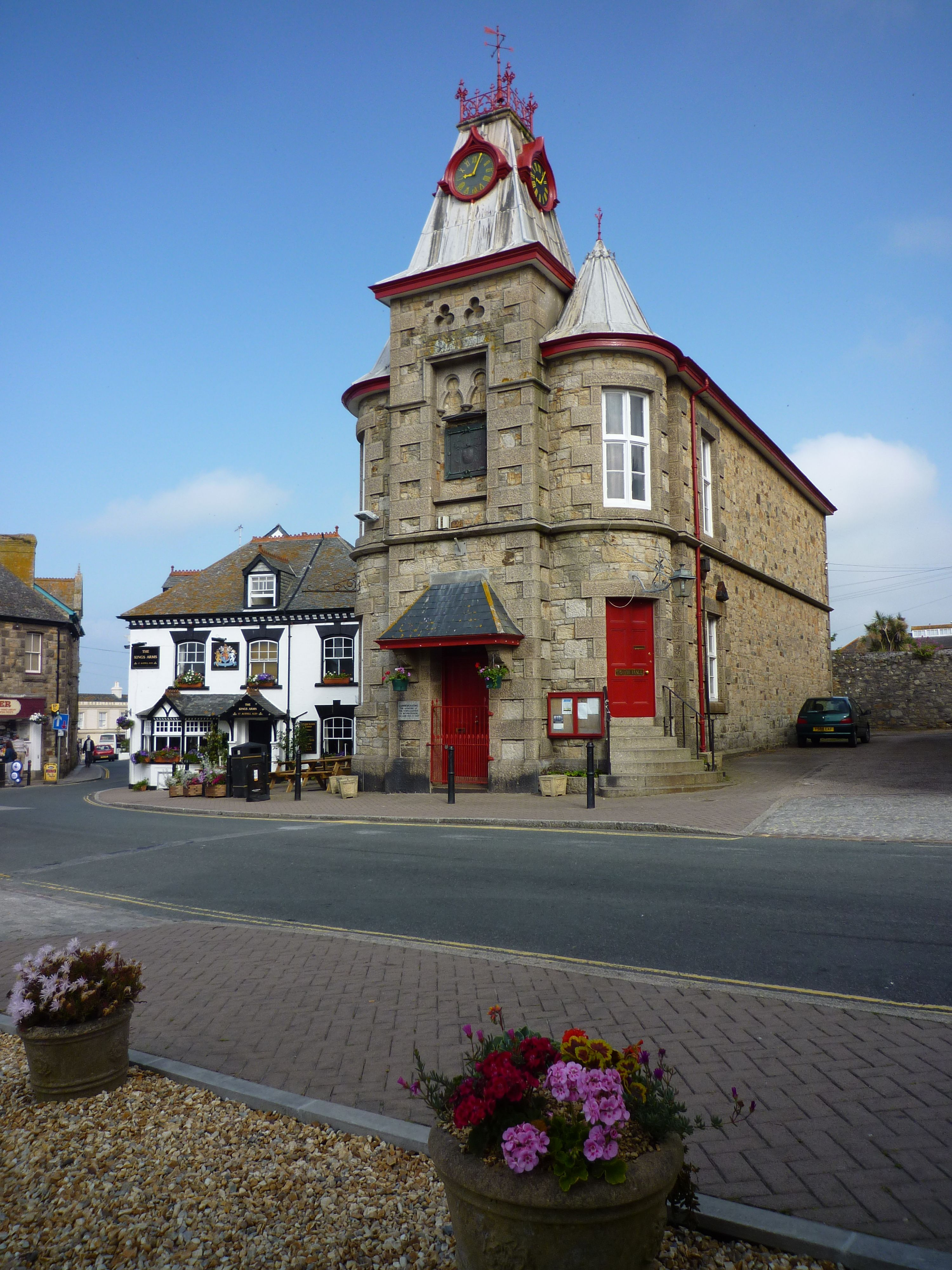
- Marazion Town Hall

- Shown in Cornwall
- 50.1238°N 5.4727°W
- Location: Market Place, Marazion, Cornwall, England

History
- Built: 1871

Site notes
- Architectural style: French Renaissance style

Listed Building – Grade II
- Official name: The Town Hall (Barclays Bank), Market Place
- Designated: 9 October 1987
- Reference no.: 1327585

Marazion Town Hall is a municipal building in the Market Place, Marazion, Cornwall, England. The town hall, which currently includes a museum on the ground floor, is a Grade II listed building.

== History ==
The current structure was commissioned to replace an old market hall which dated back at least to the mid-18th century, but was substantially rebuilt in the late-18th century.

The new building was designed in the French Renaissance style, built in rubble masonry and was completed in 1871. The design involved a symmetrical main frontage with a two-stage clock tower facing southeast onto the Market Place; there was a doorway with a wrought iron gate flanked by brackets supporting a canopy in the first stage, a blind niche with tracery surmounted by a pair of trefoils in the second stage and, above that, a mansard roof with projecting clock faces. The tower was flanked by full-height turrets surmounted by conical roofs. Internally, the council chamber on the first floor was accessed by way of a staircase in the right hand turret. A lock-up for petty criminals was established at the rear of the building.

On account of the relatively small population of the town, the borough council, which had met in the town hall, was abolished under the Municipal Corporations Act 1883. The building was subsequently transferred to a specially formed entity, the Marazion Town Trust, with the mayor, Thomas Lean, becoming the first chairman of the trust. The building comprises the council chamber and St Thomas's Hall on the first floor, whilst the ground floor of the building was originally a market hall, but became the local fire brigade headquarters (from 1892) and later a seed merchants, with a bank branch at the front (from 1891) and the two town lock-ups at the rear (until 1927). The bank became a sub-branch of Barclays Bank.

In 1992 the ground floor of the building was converted for use as a local history museum. Items included in the collection included a 17th-century cooking pot from a foundry near Taunton in Somerset and an exhibition associated with the Queen Elizabeth-class battleship, HMS Warspite, which ran aground under tow on rocks near Prussia Cove, 3 miles (4.8 km) to the east of the town, in 1947 and was subsequently broken up on Marazion beach between 1950 and 1956. The local parish council became Marazion Town Council in 1974, which meets in the council chamber in the town hall, although it chose to use the more spacious All Saints Church Hall as the meeting place during COVID-19 pandemic restrictions, but continued to post notices of its meetings on the notice board outside the town hall.
