= Sarah Pearce =

Professor of History at the University of Southampton

- Born: 1965 (age 60–61); London

Academic background
- Education: University of Oxford, University of London
- Doctoral advisor: Geza Vermes, Martin Goodman

Academic work
- Discipline: Classics
- Institutions: University of Southampton
- Notable works: Philo, The Land of the Body: Studies in Philo's Representation of Egypt The words of Moses: studies in the reception of Deuteronomy in the Second Temple Period

Sarah J. K. Pearce is Ian Karten Professor of History and Head of the School of Humanities at the University of Southampton. She is known in particular for her work on Jews in the Hellenistic world and the Roman Empire, especially the life and work of Philo of Alexandria.

== Career ==
Pearce read Divinity at the University of London gaining her BA in 1988. She moved to the Oriental Institute of the University of Oxford and gained her D.Phil. in 1995 with a dissertation on the reception of the Bible in the Second Temple period. Her work was published in an expanded version in 2013 as The words of Moses: studies in the reception of Deuteronomy in the Second Temple Period.

Pearce moved to the University of Southampton in 1996 firstly as a Parkes Fellow and then as the first Ian Karten Fellow. She became lecturer, senior lecturer and then Professor of History. She is a member of the University of Southampton's Parkes Institute for the Study of Jewish/non-Jewish Relations. Pearce was a co-director of the AHRB funded Greek Bible in the Graeco-Roman World Project (2001 to 2006) with Tessa Rajak at the University of Reading.

Pearce was a collaborator on the AHRC project based at the University of Oxford (2013 to 2016) on The Reception of Josephus in Jewish Culture from the Eighteenth Century to the Present.

Pearce is working on a new English translation and commentary on Philo's On the Decalogue for the Philo of Alexandria Commentary Series.

== Selected publications ==
=== Articles ===
- Pearce, S. (2017). The Cleopatras and the Jews. Transactions of the Royal Historical Society (Sixth Series), 27, 29-64. https://doi.org/10.1017/S0080440117000032
- Pearce, S. (2016). Notes on Philo’s use of the terms ΕΘΝΟΣ AND ΛΑΟΣ. The Studia Philonica Annual, 28, 205-226. https://doi.org/10.2307/j.ctt1gxxpz0.13
- Pearce, S. (2015). Intermarriage and the ancestors of the Jews: Philonic perspectives. The Studia Philonica Annual, 27, 1-26. https://doi.org/10.2307/j.ctt1b7x683.4
- Pearce, S. J. (2014). Pity and emotion in Josephus's reading of Joseph. Journal of Biblical Literature, 133(4), 858-862. https://doi.org/10.1353/jbl.2014.0045
- Pearce, S. J. K. (2013). Rethinking the other in antiquity: Philo of Alexandria on Intermarriage. Antichthon, 47, 140-155.
- Pearce, S. J. K. (2012). Philo and Roman Imperial power: introduction. The Studia Philonica Annual, 24, 133-137.
- Pearce, S. (2004). King Moses: notes on Philo’s portrait of Moses as an ideal leader in the life of Moses. Mélanges de l’Université Saint-Joseph, LVII, 37-74.
- Pearce, S. J. K. (2001). Contextualising Greek chronicles. Zutot: Perspectives on Jewish Culture, 1(1), 22-27. https://doi.org/10.1163/187502101788691024
- Pearce, S. J. K. (1996). Echoes of Eden in the old Greek of Susanna. Feminist Theology, 4(11), 11-31. https://doi.org/10.1177/096673509600001102
- Pearce, S. J. K. (1995). Flavius Josephus as interpreter of Biblical law: the Council of Seven and the Levitical Servants in Jewish Antiquities 4.214. The Heythrop Journal, 36(4), 477-492. https://doi.org/10.1111/j.1468-2265.1995.tb01005.x
- Pearce, S. (1995). Josephus as interpreter of Biblical law: the representation of the High Court of Deut. 17:8-12 according to Jewish Antiquities 4.218. Journal of Jewish Studies, 46(1-2), 30-42.

=== Books ===
- Salvesen, A., Pearce, S., & Frenkel, M. (Eds.) (2020). Israel in Egypt: the land of Egypt as concept and reality for Jews in antiquity and the early Medieval period. (Ancient Judaism and Early Christianity; Vol. 110). Brill. https://doi.org/10.1163/9789004435407
- Runia, D. T. (Ed.), Sterling, G. E., Pearce, S. J. K. (Ed.), & Cox, R. (Ed.) (2016). The Studia Philonica Annual XXVIII, 2016: Studies in Hellenistic Judaism. (Studia Philonica Annual and Monographs). SBL Press. https://doi.org/10.2307/j.ctt1gxxpz0
- Pearce, S. (Ed.) (2013). The image and its prohibition in Jewish antiquity. (Journal of Jewish Studies Supplement Series; No. 2). Journal of Jewish Studies.
- Pearce, S. (2013). The words of Moses: studies in the reception of Deuteronomy in the Second Temple Period. (Texte und Studien zum antiken Judentum). Mohr Siebeck.
- Jordan, J., Kushner, A., & Pearce, S. (Eds.) (2010). Jewish journeys: from Philo to Hip Hop. (Parkes-Wiener Series on Jewish Studies). Vallentine Mitchell.
- Rajak, T., Pearce, S., & Aitken, J. (Eds.) (2007). Jewish perspectives on Hellenistic rulers. (Hellenistic Culture and Society). University of California Press.
- Pearce, S. (2007). The Land of the Body: Studies in Philo's Representation of Egypt. (Wissenschaftliche Untersuchungen zum Neuen Testament; No. 208). Mohr Siebeck.
- Jones, S., & Pearce, S. (Eds.) (1998). Jewish local patriotism and self-identification in the Graeco-Roman period. (The Library of Second Temple Studies; Vol. 31). Sheffield Academic Press.
- Jones, S., Kushner, T., & Pearce, S. (Eds.) (1997). Cultures of contempt and ambivalence: studies in Jewish-non-Jewish relations. (Parkes-Wiener Series on Jewish Studies). Vallentine Mitchell.

=== Book chapters ===
- Pearce, S. (2021). Philo and the Septuagint. In A. G. Salvesen, & T. M. Law (Eds.), The Oxford Handbook of the Septuagint (pp. 405–419). Oxford University Press.
- Pearce, S. (2020). Philo of Alexandria and the memory of Ptolemy II Philadelphus. In A. Salvesen, S. Pearce, M. Frenkel, & D. Crowther (Eds.), Israel in Egypt: the Land of Egypt as Concept and Reality for Jews in Antiquity and the Early Medieval Period (Vol. 110, pp. 216–258). (Ancient Judaism and Early Christianity; Vol. 110). Brill. https://doi.org/10.1163/9789004435407_010
- Pearce, S. (2019). Josephus and the Jewish Chronicle: 1841-1855. In A. Schatz (Ed.), Josephus in Modern Jewish Culture (pp. 106–143). (Studies in Jewish History and Culture; Vol. 55). Brill. https://doi.org/10.1163/9789004393097_007
- Pearce, S. (2019). Ptolemy II Philadelphus in the Letter of Aristeas §§1-27: A study in power. In D. Rivlin-Sachs, N. Hacham, G. Herman, & L. Sagiv (Eds.), A Question of Identity: Social, Political, and Historical Aspects of the Formation of Identity in Jewish and Related Contexts (pp. 201–221). De Gruyter. https://doi.org/10.1515/9783110615449-010
- Pearce, S. (2016). 'ed (Zeuge). In H-J. Fabry, & U. Dahmen (Eds.), Theologisches Woerterbuch zu den Qumrantexten Band 3 (pp. 26–29). Kohlhammer.
- Pearce, S. (2013). Introduction. In S. Pearce (Ed.), The Image and its Prohibition in Jewish Antiquity (pp. 1–9). (Journal of Jewish Studies Supplement Series; No. 2). Journal of Jewish Studies.
- Pearce, S. J. (2013). On the Decalogue. In L. H. Feldman, J. L. Kugel, & L. H. Schiffman (Eds.), Outside the Bible: Ancient Jewish Writings Related to Scripture. 3-Volume Set (pp. 989–1032). Jewish Publication Society.
- Pearce, S. (2013). Philo of Alexandria on the Second Commandment. In S. Pearce (Ed.), The Image and its Prohibition in Jewish Antiquity (pp. 49–76). (Journal of Jewish Studies Supplement Series; No. 2). Journal of Jewish Studies.
- Pearce, S. (2011). Philo and the Temple Scroll on the prohibition of single testimony. In A. Lange, K. De Troyer, S. Tzoref, & N. Dávid (Eds.), The Hebrew Bible in Light of the Dead Sea Scrolls (pp. 321–336). (Forschungen zur Religion und Literatur des Alten und Neuen Testaments; No. 239). Vandenhoeck and Ruprecht.
- Pearce, S. (2011). Philo of Alexandria on Jewish law and Jewish community. In M. A. Júnior (Ed.), Fílon de Alexandria: Nas Origens da Cultura Occidental (pp. 137–154). Centro de Estudios Classicos (Faculdade de Letras de Lisboa).
- Pearce, S. (2010). Egypt on the Pentateuch’s map of migration. In T. Kushner, J. Jordan, & S. Pearce (Eds.), Jewish journeys: from Philo to Hip Hop (pp. 165–181). (Parkes-Wiener Series on Jewish Studies). Vallentine Mitchell.
- Pearce, S. (2010). Egypt on the Pentatuech's Map of Migration in the Writings of Philo of Alexandria. In J. Jordan, T. Kushner, & S. Pearce (Eds.), Jewish Journeys: from Philo to Hip Hop (Parkes-Wiener Series on Jewish Studies). Vallentine Mitchell.
- Jordan, J., Kushner, T., & Pearce, S. (2010). Introduction: the Nature of Jewish Journeys. In J. Jordan, T. Kushner, & S. Pearce (Eds.), Jewish journeys: from Philo to Hip Hop (pp. 3–24). (Parkes-Wiener Series on Jewish Studies). Vallentine Mitchell.
- Pearce, S. (2009). Animal worship. In H-J. Klauck, V. Leppin, B. McGinn, C-L. Seow, H. Spieckermann, B. D. Walfish, & E. J. Ziolkowski (Eds.), The Encyclopedia of the Bible and Its Reception. Volume 2: Anim - Atheism De Gruyter.
- Pearce, S. (2008). Josephus. In E. Kessler, & N. Wenborn (Eds.), A Dictionary of Jewish-Christian Relations Cambridge University Press.
- Pearce, S. (2008). Onkelos. In E. Kessler, & N. Wenborn (Eds.), A Dictionary of Jewish-Christian Relations Cambridge University Press.
- Pearce, S. (2008). Philo. In E. Kessler, & N. Wenborn (Eds.), A Dictionary of Jewish-Christian Relations Cambridge University Press.
- Pearce, S. (2008). Pseudepigrapha. In E. Kessler, & N. Wenborn (Eds.), A Dictionary of Jewish-Christian Relations Cambridge University Press.
- Pearce, S. (2008). Translating for Ptolemy: patriotism and politics in the Greek Pentateuch? In T. Rajak, S. Pearce, J. Aitken, & J. Dines (Eds.), Jewish Perspectives on Hellenistic Kingship (pp. 165–189). (Hellenistic Culture and Society). University of California Press.
- Pearce, S. (2007). Philo on the Nile. In J. Frey, D. R. Schwartz, & S. Gripentrog (Eds.), Jewish Identity in the Greco-Roman World (pp. 137–157). (Ancient Judaism and Early Christianity; Vol. 71). Brill.
- Pearce, S. (2006). Speaking with the voice of God: the High Court according to Greek Deuteronomy 17:8-13. In C. Hempel, & J. M. Lieu (Eds.), Biblical Traditions in Transmission: Essays in Honour of Michael A. Knibb (pp. 237–248). (Supplements to the Journal for the Study of Judaism; Vol. 111). Brill.
- Pearce, S. (2004). Jerusalem as "Mother-City" in the writings of Philo of Alexandria. In J. M. G. Barclay (Ed.), Negotiating Diaspora: Jewish Strategies in the Roman Empire (pp. 19–37). (Library of Second Temple Studies; No. 45). T. & T. Clark International.
- Pearce, S. (2004). Jerusalem as mother city in the writings of Philo of Alexandria. In J. M. G. Barclay (Ed.), Negotiating Diaspora: Jewish Strategies in the Roman Empire (pp. 19–36). (The Library of Second Temple Studies; Vol. 45). T&T Clark.
- Pearce, S. (2004). King Moses: Notes on Philo's portrait of Moses as an ideal leader in the Life of Moses. In The Greek Strand in Political Thought. Proceedings of the Conference held at the Institute for Advanced Study, Princeton, 16–27 June 2003 (pp. 37–74). (Mélanges de l'Université Saint-Joseph; Vol. LVII). Université Saint-Joseph.
- Pearce, S. (2002). Judaea under Roman rule 63-135 CE. In J. Barton (Ed.), The Biblical World (pp. 458–491). Routledge.
- Pearce, S. (2001). 3 Maccabees. In J. Barton, & J. Muddiman (Eds.), The Oxford Bible Commentary (pp. 773–775). Oxford University Press.
- Pearce, S. (2000). Josephus and the Witness Laws of Deuteronomy. In J. U. Kalms (Ed.), Internationales Josephus-Kolloquium Aarhus 1999 (pp. 122–134). (Münsteraner Judaistische Studien). Lit Verlag.
- Pearce, S. (1998). Belonging and not belonging: local perspectives in Philo of Alexandria. In S. Jones, & S. Pearce (Eds.), Jewish Local Patriotism and Self-Identification in the Graeco-Roman Period (pp. 79–105). (The Library of Second Temple Studies). Sheffield Academic Press.
- Pearce, S. (1997). Attitudes of contempt: Christian anti-Judaism and the Bible. In T. Kushner, S. Jones, & S. Pearce (Eds.), Cultures of Ambivalence and Contempt: Studies in Jewish-non-Jewish Relations (pp. 50–71). (Parkes-Wiener Series on Jewish Studies). Vallentine Mitchell.
