= Bishop's College, Calcutta =

Indian educational establishment

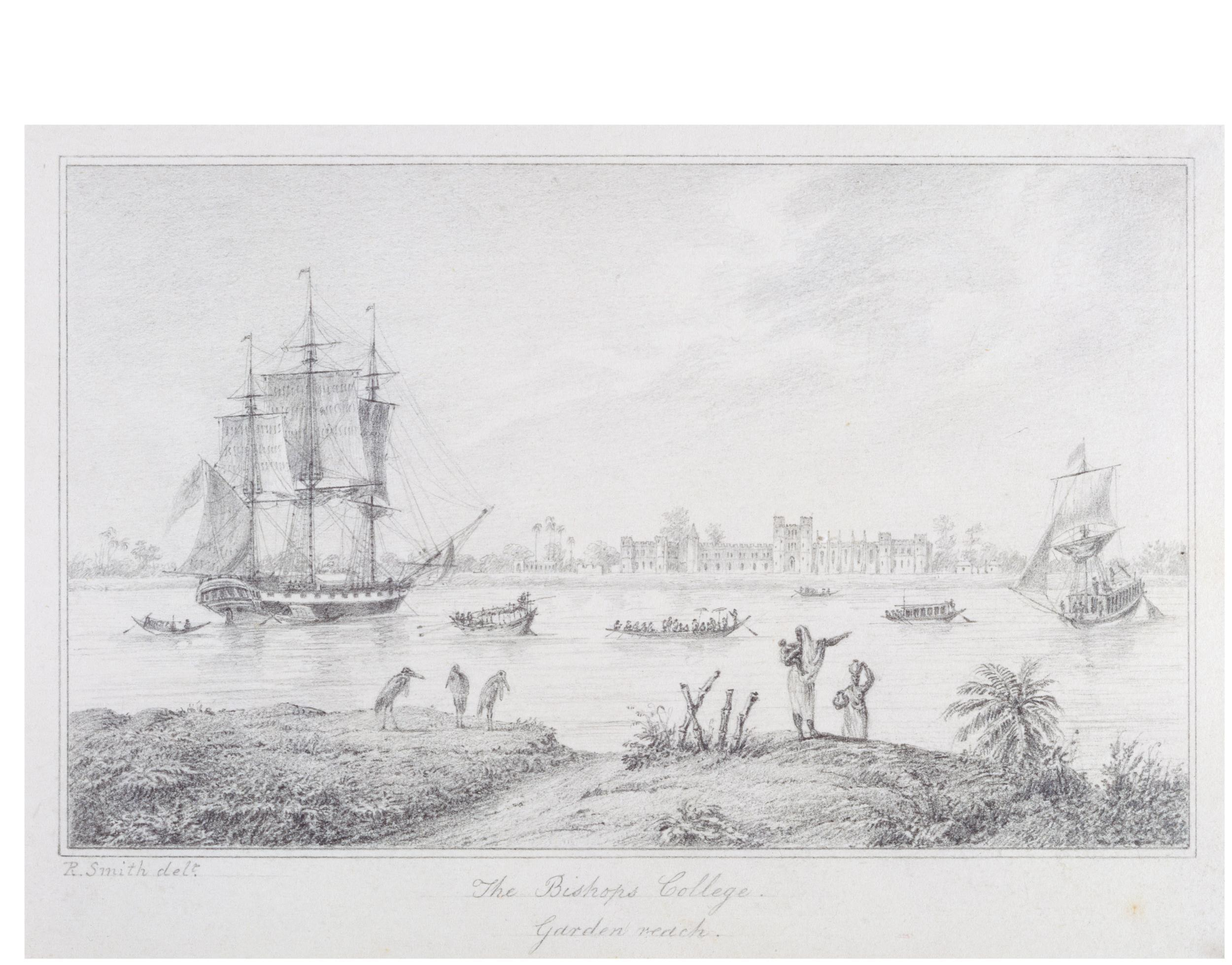
A view of The Bishop's College, Garden Reach, Calcutta

Bishop's College, Calcutta is an Anglican educational establishment founded on 15 December 1820 at Sibpur by Thomas Fanshawe Middleton the first bishop of the Anglican diocese of Calcutta. The college was started in Shibpur, on the west bank of the Hooghly River, a location now occupied by the Bengal Engineering and Science University (IIEST Shibpur).

== Principals ==
- 1849–1864 William Kay.
