= Henry Adeney Redpath =

British philologist

Henry Adeney Redpath (1848–1908) was an English cleric and biblical scholar.

== Life ==
Born at Sydenham on 19 June 1848, he was eldest son of Henry Syme Redpath, solicitor of Sydenham, by his wife Harriet Adeney of Islington. In 1857 he entered Merchant Taylors' School, and won a scholarship at The Queen's College, Oxford, in 1867, taking a second class in classical moderations in 1869 and a third class in literæ humaniores in 1871, graduating B.A. in 1871, and proceeding M.A. in 1874 and D.Litt. in 1901.

Ordained deacon in 1872 and priest in 1874, Redpath, became curate of Southam in Warwickshire, and then of Luddesdown in Kent. He was successively vicar of Wolvercote near Oxford (1880–3), rector of Holwell, Dorset (1883–90), and vicar of Sparsholt, Oxfordshire with Kingston Lisle (1890–8). In 1898. by an exchange, he became rector of St. Dunstan-in-the-East in London.

Redpath was Grinfield lecturer on the Septuagint at Oxford (1901–5). He was also sub-warden of the Society of Sacred Study in the diocese of London, and examining chaplain to the Bishop of London (1905–8). He died at Sydenham on 24 September 1908, and was buried at Shottermill, Surrey.

== Works ==
Redpath had learned Hebrew at Merchant Taylors' School, and specialised in the Greek of the Septuagint, completing and publishing the work which Edwin Hatch had left unfinished: A Concordance to the Septuagint and other Greek Translations of the Old Testament (Oxford, 1892-1906, 3 vols.). At the end of his life he was working on a Dictionary of Patristic Greek.

A conservative biblical scholar, Redpath set out his view of the Old Testament in Modern Criticism and the Book of Genesis (1905), published by the Society for Promoting Christian Knowledge. His Westminster Commentary on Ezekiel appeared in 1907. He was also a contributor to Hastings' Dictionary of the Bible (1904) and to the Illustrated Bible Dictionary.

== Family ==
Redpath married at Marsh Caundle, Dorset, on 5 October 1886, Catherine Helen, daughter of Henry Peter Auber of Marsh Court, Sherborne. She died at Shottermill on 26 August 1898, leaving one son.

== Notes ==
Attribution

This article incorporates text from a publication now in the public domain: Lee, Sidney, ed. (1912). "Redpath, Henry Adeney". Dictionary of National Biography (2nd supplement). Vol. 3. London: Smith, Elder & Co.
