= Holwell, Dorset =

Village and civil parish in Dorset, England

Coordinates: 50.896°N 2.424°W

Holwell
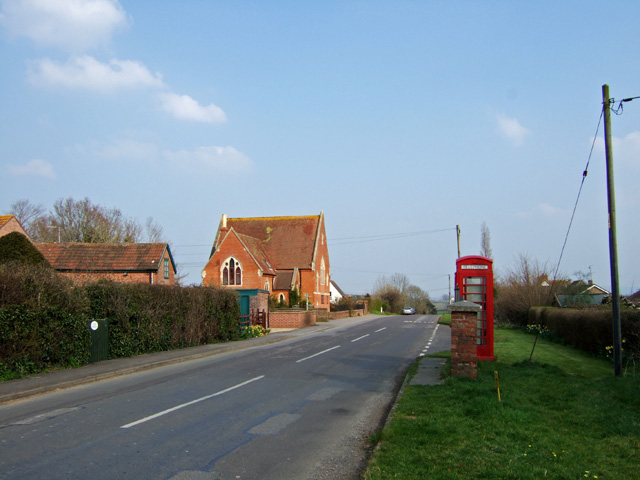
- Holwell

- Location within Dorset
- Population: 404 (2021 census)
- OS grid reference: ST703107
- Civil parish: Holwell
- Unitary authority: Dorset
- Ceremonial county: Dorset
- Region: South West
- Country: England
- Sovereign state: United Kingdom
- Post town: Sherborne
- Postcode district: DT9
- Dialling code: 01963
- Police: Dorset
- Fire: Dorset and Wiltshire
- Ambulance: South Western
- UK Parliament: West Dorset

Holwell is a village and civil parish in the county of Dorset in southern England, situated approximately 5 miles (8.0 km) south-east of Sherborne. It is sited on Oxford clay in the Blackmore Vale. Its name derives from the Old English hol and walu, meaning a bank or ridge in a hollow. The parish includes the hamlets of Barnes Cross, The Borough, Pleck Green, Sandhills, Westrow, and Woodbridge. In the 2021 census the parish had a population of 404.

Holwell parish church is situated with a few houses at the end of a cul-de-sac in a small settlement called The Borough. This is the original medieval part of the village, sited next to the Caundle Brook in the north of the parish. Secondary settlements were established later to the south, east and west; these were outside The Borough's open field system and had their own enclosures. The most southerly part of the parish was enclosed in 1797. The church, dedicated to St Lawrence, largely dates from the late 15th century, though it was restored in 1885. The biblical scholar Henry Adeney Redpath was rector at Holwell between 1883 and 1890.

A short distance north of the church the Caundle Brook is crossed by a packhorse bridge, probably of medieval origin. About 0.5 miles (0.80 km) to the west and also crossing the Caundle Brook is Cornford Bridge, dating from the 15th and 18th centuries and designated a grade II* listed building and a scheduled monument. Also grade II* listed is Naish Farm, situated approximately 0.5 miles (0.80 km) southeast of The Borough and a good example of a medieval domestic farmhouse.

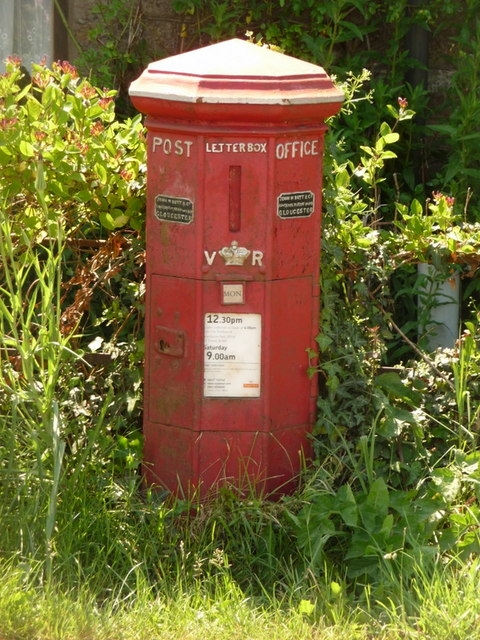
Post box DT9 4, 13 June 2010

At Barnes Cross—between The Borough and Cornford Bridge—is a pillar box which is the oldest still in everyday use in Britain. It is hexagonal with a vertical letter slot and was made between 1853 and 1856 by the Gloucester firm John N. Butt & Co. It is also grade II* listed.

== Governance ==
At the lower level of local government, Holwell is a civil parish with a parish council of up to seven elected members.

At the higher level, Holwell is in Dorset unitary district. For elections to Dorset Council it is in Sherborne Rural electoral ward.

Historically, Holwell was an exclave of Somerset until 1844, being part of the parish of Milborne Port. Under Dorset County Council in the two-tier system of local government, Holwell was in Sherborne rural district from 1894 to 1974, and then in West Dorset district until Dorset became unitary in 2019.

== Demographics ==
Census population of Holwell (Dorset) parish
Census	Population	Female	Male	Households	Source
1921	359				
1931	342				
1951	323				
1961	293				
1971	300				
1981	390				
1991	370				
2001	380	188	192	157	
2011	369	186	183	160	
2021	404	198	206	166	
