= Bromsgrove School =

Public school in Worcestershire, England

- Coat of arms of Bromsgrove School (arms of Cookes, with inescutcheon of a baronet)

Location
- Worcester Road; Bromsgrove, Worcestershire, B61 7DU; England; 52.328611°N 2.063333°W

Information
- Type: Public school Independent day and boarding school Coeducational school
- Motto: Deo, regi, vicino (Latin: "For God, for King, for Neighbour")
- Religious affiliation: Church of England
- Established: 1553 (established); 1476 (first recorded)
- Founder: Sir Thomas Cookes
- Local authority: Worcestershire
- Department for Education URN: 117012 Tables
- Chairman of the Governors: Michael Luckman
- Headmaster: Michael E. Punt M.A. (Oxon) MSc
- Chaplain: Paul Hedworth
- Staff: 599 (200 teaching staff)
- Gender: Coeducational
- Age: 2 to 18
- Enrolment: 2114
- Houses: 13 (senior school); 4 (preparatory school); 3 (pre-preparatory)
- Colour: Maroon
- Alumni: Old Bromsgrovians
- Website: http://www.bromsgrove-school.co.uk

Bromsgrove School is a co-educational boarding and day school in the English public school tradition located in Bromsgrove, England. Founded in 1553, it is one of the oldest public school in Britain, and one of the 14 founding members of the Headmasters' and Headmistresses' Conference.

Bromsgrove School has both boarding and day students consisting of three schools, pre-prep nursery school (ages 2–7), preparatory school (ages 7–13) and the senior school (13–18). Bromsgrove charges up to £18,114 per term, with three terms per academic year. The school has a total of 200 teaching staff, with 2,114 pupils.

Spread across 100 acres, the main campus is located in the heart of the town of Bromsgrove. However, Bromsgrove School has also expanded overseas, with an additional boarding school in Bangkok (Bromsgrove International School Thailand) and a new school within the Mission Hills complex in Shenzhen, China, Bromsgrove School Mission Hills.

The school's headmaster from September 2022 is Michael Punt, who was previously headmaster of Chigwell School.

== History ==
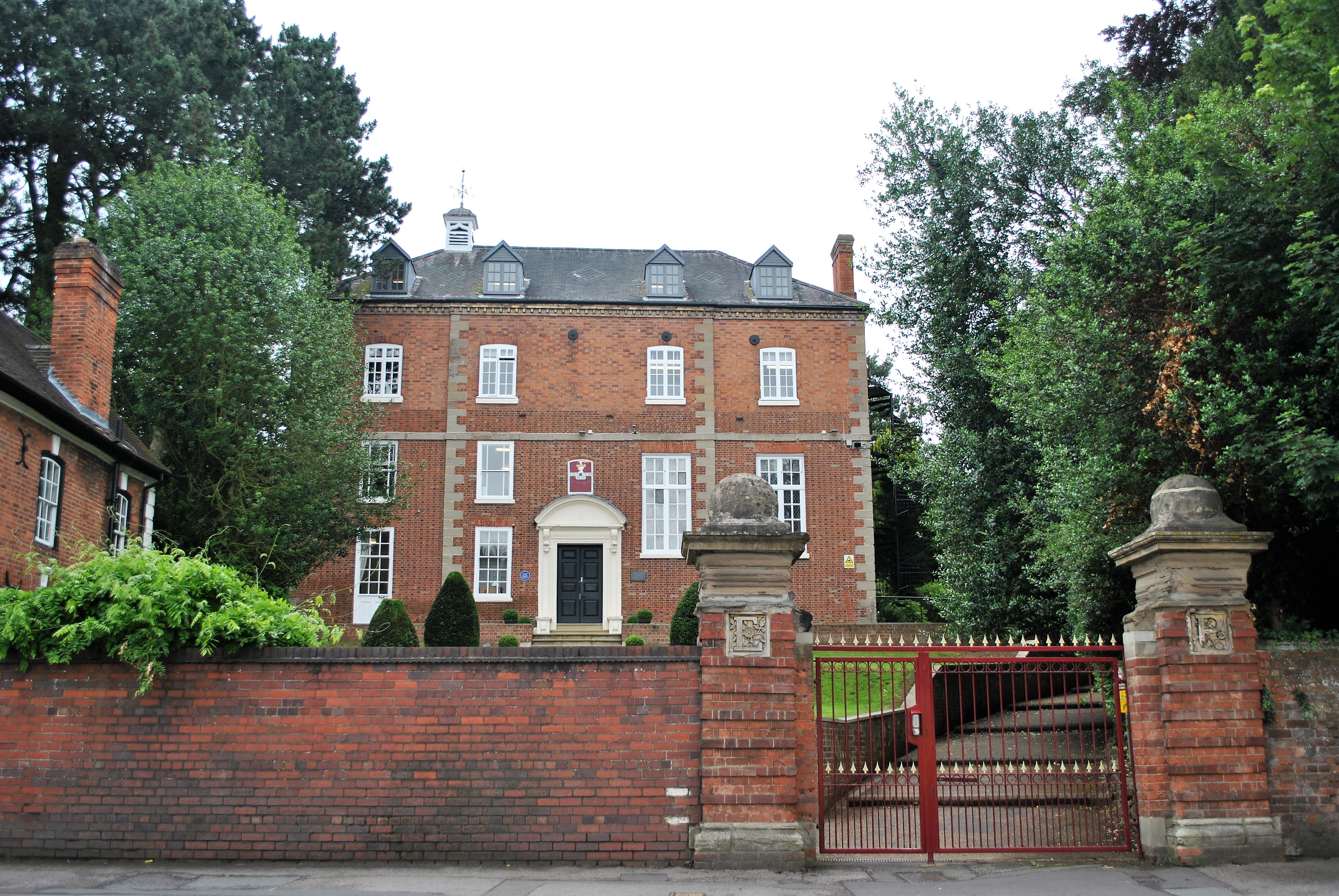
Thomas Cookes House, founded by Sir Thomas Cookes in 1693, is the oldest building on the site

The school was first recorded in 1476 as a chantry school and was re-established as a grammar school between 1548 and 1553. The 1693 financial endowment of Sir Thomas Cookes, 2nd Baronet (1648–1701) of Norgrove Court in Worcestershire, produced the first buildings on the present site and the historic link with Worcester College, Oxford, which he founded. The arms of Cookes (Argent, two chevronels between six martlets 3, 2 and 1 gules) were adopted by both Worcester College and Bromsgrove School. John Day Collis became head-master in December 1842. The tercentenary of the grammar school was celebrated on 31 March 1853. In 1856, Collis had the chapel and new school rooms built, and existing buildings enlarged and improved. In 1869 Bromsgrove was one of the fourteen founding schools of the Headmasters' Conference.

=== Second World War ===
During the Second World War, the entire school was temporarily moved to Llanwrtyd Wells in Wales, as the school buildings were requisitioned by British government departments for the war effort. Many former pupils and members of staff were killed during the Second World War, and their names are commemorated at the war memorial of the town. In 2007, the school was granted the freedom of Llanwrtyd Wells.

=== Overseas ===
In 2002, the school established Bromsgrove International School Thailand (BIST) in Thailand. Then, in 2016, the school opened Bromsgrove School Mission Hills, in Shenzhen, China.

== Scandals ==
=== Financial ===
In 2005, the school was one of fifty of the country's independent schools which were found guilty of running an illegal price-fixing cartel, exposed by The Times, which had allowed them to drive up fees for thousands of parents. Each school was required to pay a nominal penalty of £10,000 and all agreed to make ex-gratia payments totalling £3 million into a trust designed to benefit pupils who attended the schools during the period in respect of which fee information was shared.

=== Abuse ===
Richard Knight, an Organist and assistant director of music at Bromsgrove School was jailed for two years in 2018 for having sex with two girls from Bromsgrove School on school property, as well as at his own home, inside his car and on the school's USA 2010 Chapel Music Tour. Judge Jeremy Baker QC, speaking at Worcester Crown Court on Friday, 23 November 2018, told Knight, 53, that the two victims had "particularly vulnerable" emotional backgrounds. "You knew that and that was why they were specifically targeted over and above other children at school", he said. The judge described Knight's behaviour as "predatory" and that there was a "significant degree of planning". Mr Knight, previously the conductor of Malvern Festival Chorus, had begun the second affair after the first one ended, and taught both pupils at the school. Knight had sex with one of the victims for the first time at her own home while her parents were out during Christmas Eve. The victim would often have to ride her bicycle to various pharmacists to get morning after pills. The court also heard evidence that Knight's wife had been a pupil of his at a school he worked at previously. They married in 2002.

== Students ==
Bromsgrove School has boarding and day students and consists of three schools, pre-prep nursery school (ages 2–7), preparatory school (ages 7–13) and the senior school (13–18). The school has a total of 200 teaching staff, with 1,660 pupils, including 220 in the pre-preparatory school, 500 in the preparatory School and 940 in the senior school, of whom 60% are male and 40% female, 60% boarding and 40% day. As well as British students, there are more than three hundred from 49 different countries, especially Russia, Germany, China and Hong Kong.

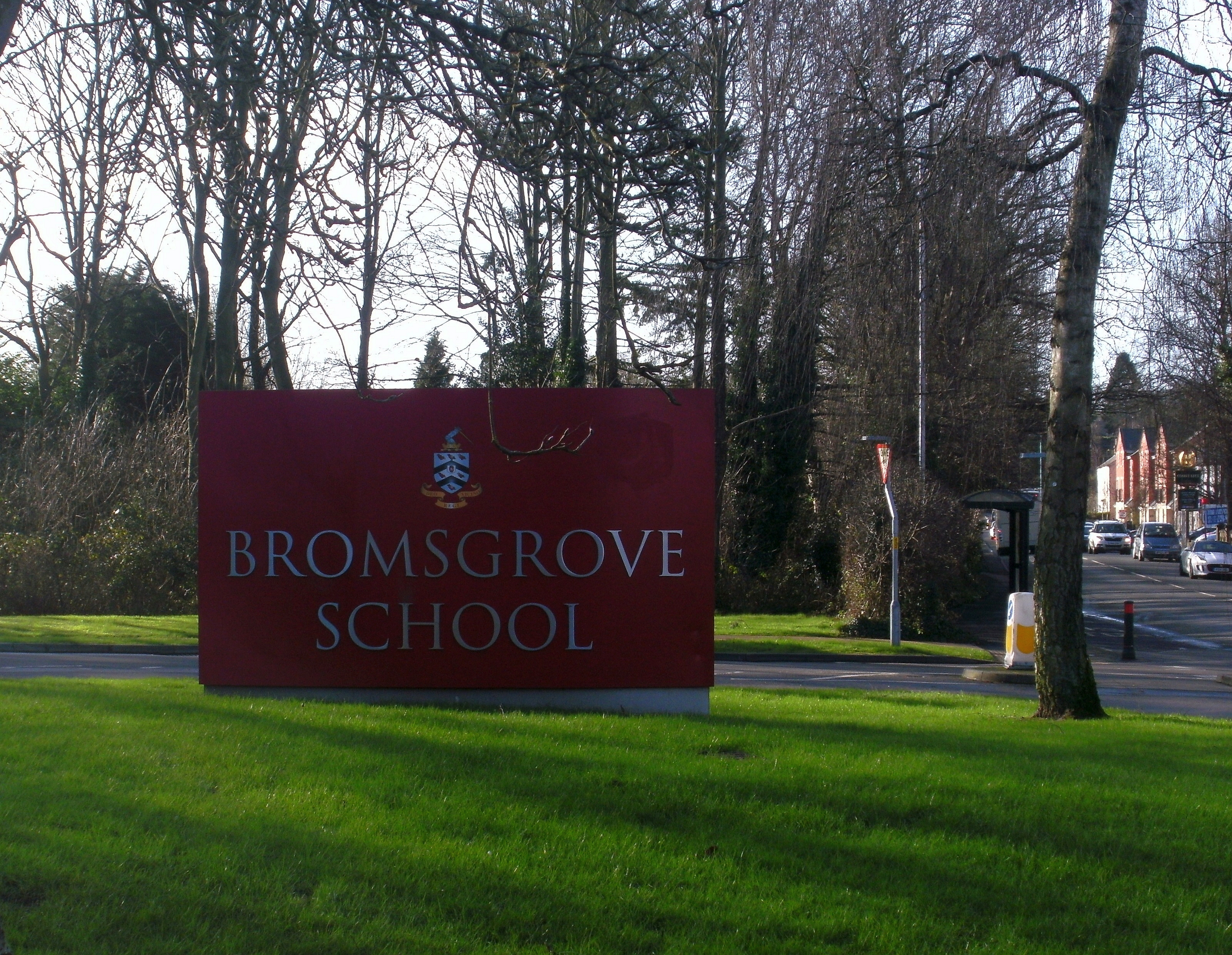
Main Worcester Road entrance

The school website states that the pass rate at grades A* to C (exams at age 16) is 96%. Bromsgrove also started teaching the International Baccalaureate Diploma (IB) in 2009, with sixth form students having the choice between IB, BTEC and A-Levels. The rugby match against King Edward's School, Birmingham, that has been played annually since 1875, is thought to be the oldest continuous rugby fixture between two schools in England.

== Heads of school and monitors ==
Similar to most public schools in Britain and the Commonwealth, Bromsgrove has a system of school leaders known as monitors. As representatives of the school, monitors' jobs are mostly based around keeping the school running at its best level of quality and tradition, with chapel and lunch duties being an example of this. Pupils who belong to any of these categories, in addition to other leadership roles, are entitled to a certain set of privileges, such as monitor ties, brown shoes, and waistcoats/cardigans.

In addition to the monitors, Bromsgrove has a set of heads of school featuring a head boy and girl, and their respective deputies.

Monitors and heads of school are chosen towards the end of their penultimate lower sixth year; the decision is made from a combination of both a student poll and teacher vote.

== Academic results ==
57% of Bromsgrove School students achieved A*/A for the 2019 A Levels examination while 64% of students obtained A*/A for the 2019 GCSE examination.

== Houses ==
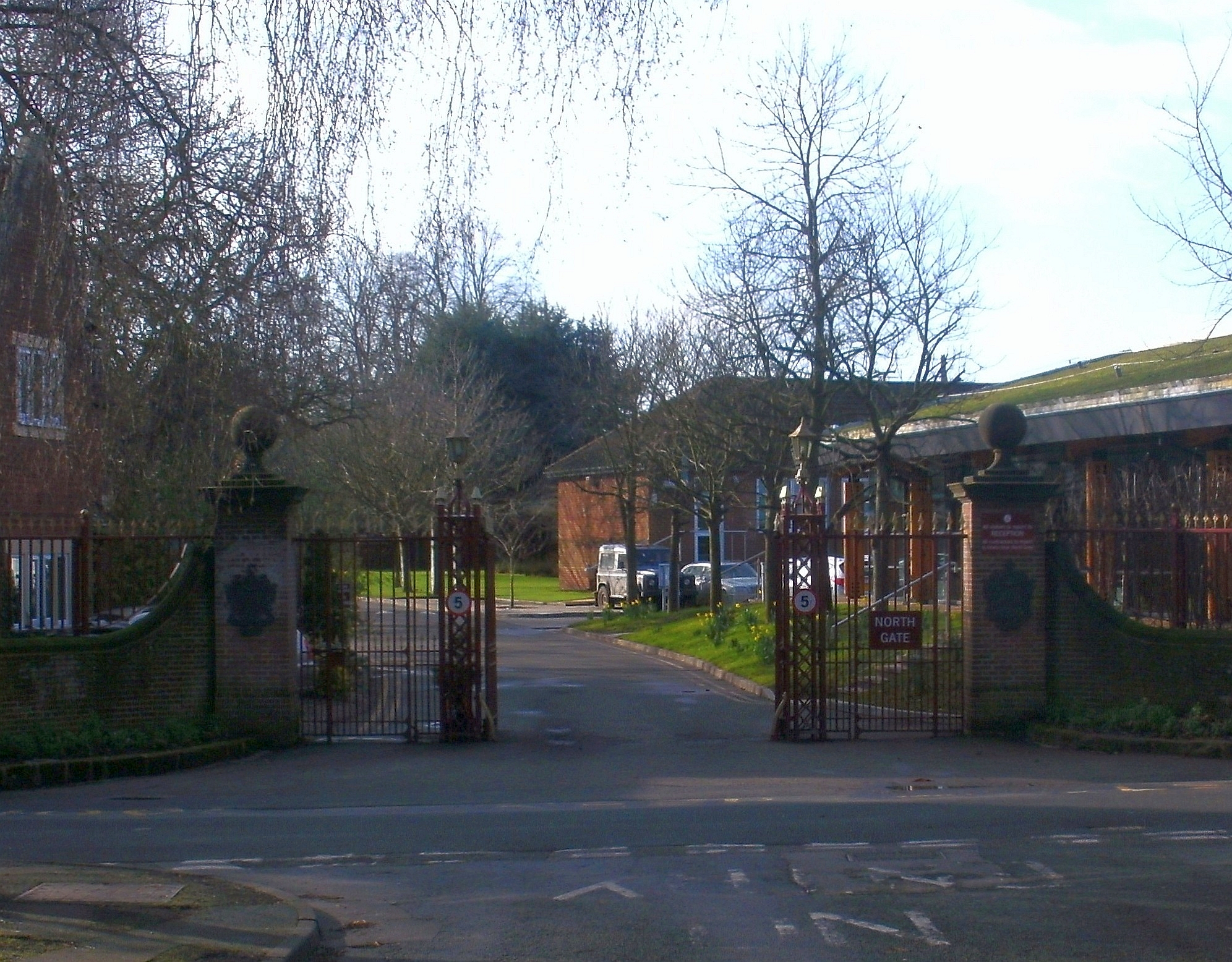
North Gate entrance, with the Dining Hall seen behind to the right

The preparatory school houses of Boulton (Matthew Boulton), Darby (Abraham Darby), Telford (Thomas Telford), Watt (James Watt), were named after famous British industrialists.
The houses were renamed in 2020 Cedar, Rowan, Ash, Willow, Sycamore and Beech after species of trees. The change was made to avoid links to those involved with the slave trade or child labour.

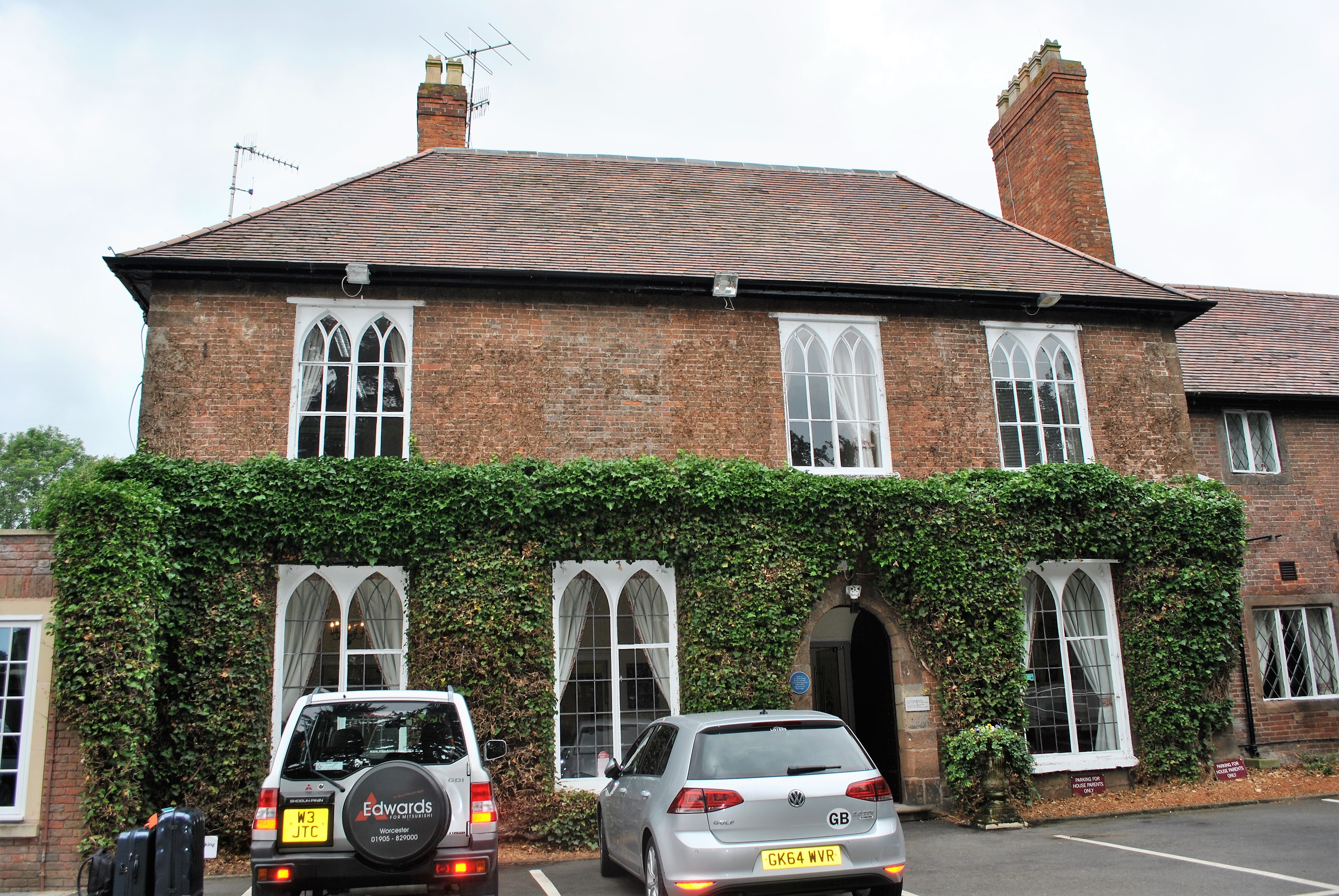
Housman Hall, one of the school's senior boarding houses, was formerly the home of poet A. E. Housman

The senior school is divided into thirteen houses; six for boys, five for girls and two mixed.

=== Boarding houses ===
Mary Windsor, named after the daughter of Thomas Hickman-Windsor, 1st Earl of Plymouth and his wife Anne Savile, is for girl boarders. In 2012, Mary Windsor was moved into a new building as part of the developments around the south gate.

Oakley House is the largest house. It is situated alongside Mary Windsor and Elmshurst, in the newly developed area by the South Gate.

Housman Hall for sixth form girls and boys was opened in 2005, after the school bought the Ramada Perry Hall Hotel for £3 million. The building was formerly the home of A. E. Housman, an old Bromsgrovian, and was expanded in 2009 into the neighbouring building, subsequently named after Housman. During an opening ceremony in 2014, Housman Hall was reopened after the school had completed a refurbishment.

Elmshurst is also for boy boarders and was named after the original house that was located at 17 New Road. Elmshurst was sold in the mid-1970s and the students relocated within the school campus to the current building, which was refurbished in 2018.

Webber House, while still classed as an autonomous annex of Wedron-Gordon House, is the newest boarding house at Bromsgrove School, catering to Sixth Form boarders.

=== Day Houses ===
Lupton, named after Lupton House, in Sedbergh School, and Lyttelton, named after the school's links with Baron Lyttelton, a local lord, are houses for day boys, located in the centre of the campus. Walters, named after the school's wartime headmaster, is also a boys' day house.

Thomas Cookes and Hazeldene are two girls' day houses that are situated in the original and oldest building on the school's site.

School House is the senior house of the school, and often considered the most prestigious. After beginning as a boarding house, School is now a boys day house situated in the west wing of the Wendron-Gordon building. It consistently ranks as one of the most academically able houses, winning multiple prizes in academics and debating. It leads the final call over during the end of year Commemoration Day ceremony.

Ottilie Hild is the newest girls' day house, overlooking Gordon Green and opened in September 2020.

House	Abbr.	Gender	Type	Colours
Elmshurst	E	Boys	Boarding	
Hazeldene	Hz	Girls	Day	
Housman Hall	HH	Mixed	Boarding	
Lupton	Lu	Boys	Day	
Lyttelton	Ly	Boys	Day	
Mary Windsor	MW	Girls	Boarding	
Oakley	O	Girls	Boarding	
Ottilie Hild	OH	Girls	Day	
School	S	Boys	Day	
Thomas Cookes	TC	Girls	Day	
Walters	Ws	Boys	Day	
Wendron-Gordon	WG	Boys	Boarding	

== School terms ==
There are three academic terms in the year.

- The Michaelmas term, from early September to mid December. New pupils are now admitted only at the start of the Michaelmas, unless in exceptional circumstances.
- The Lent term, from early January to late March.
- The Summer term, from late April to late June or early July.

Within each term, there is a break known as a half term, in which all pupils return home.

== Headmasters ==
The headmasters of the school:

- 2022–present Michael Punt
- 2014–2022 Peter Clague
- 2004–2014 Christopher Edwards
- 1986–2004 Timothy Taylor
- 1970–1985 Nick Earle
- 1953–1970 Lionel Carey
- 1931–1953 David Walters
- 1912–1931 Robert G Routh
- 1901–1912 Frederick Hendy
- 1873–1901 Herbert Millington
- 1867–1873 George Blore
- 1842–1867 John Day Collis
- 1832–1842 George Jacob
- 1819–1832 John Topham
- 1817–1819 no headmaster
- 1816 Thomas Davies (sent to Fleet Prison)
- 1813–1816 no headmaster
- 1812 Joseph Fell (writing master)
- 1810–1812 no headmaster
- 1804–1810 Hugh Price
- 1799–1804 Jeremiah Roberts
- 1788–1799 Charles Shipley
- 1776–1788 John Best
- 1756–1776 John Bennett
- 1735–1756 Charles Wilmott
- 1721–1735 Thomas Wilmott
- 1693–1721 John Barney
- 1690–1693 Robert Durant
- 1687–1690 Samuel Lloyd
- 1679–1687 John Barney
- 1678–1679 Samuel Lloyd
- 1667–1678 James Orton
- 1665–1667 no headmaster
- 1664–1665 William Broughton
- 1650–1664 William Suthwell
- 1643–1650 William Spicer
- 1625–1643 John Crumpe
- 1622–1625 James Purcell
- 1616–1622 Thomas Flavell
- 1611–1616 William Binion
- 1606–1611 Henry Duggard
- 1597–1606 Humphrey Roe
- 1577–1597 Arnold Hancox
- 1562–1577 Robert Kymberley
- 1558–1562 Thomas Palmer
- 1545–1558 William Foonys

== Notable alumni ==
Notable Old Bromsgrovians include five Victoria Cross recipients and A. E. Housman. In business and politics, Digby Jones and Michael Heseltine were both educated at Bromsgrove, as were actors Ian Carmichael, Richard Wattis (of Hancock's Half Hour, Sykes, Father Dear Father), Trevor Eve (of Shoestring), Nick Miles (of Emmerdale) and Arthur Darvill (of Doctor Who). The author Nicholas Evans who wrote The Horse Whisperer and journalist Chris Atkins were educated at Bromsgrove. More recently, Iskra Lawrence (an English model, global role model and brand ambassador) attended the School.

In music, composer Isaiah Burnell was director of music from 1907 for 25 years. John Illsley, of the band Dire Straits, Guillemots member Fyfe Dangerfield, Ritchie Neville of boy band Five and jazz saxophonist Soweto Kinch attended the school.

Matt Neal attended during the 1980s, and Andy Goode was part of the drive by the school to welcome more leading rugby players to the school. Bromsgrove has educated England national sportsmen including Ben Foden, Ollie Lawrence and Matt Mullan who have played Rugby union for England.

Others include Peter Spence, an English journalist and writer who wrote the British sitcom To the Manor Born and Admiral Sir Ben Key KCB, CBE, ADC, who is a senior naval officer; and has served as First Sea Lord since November 2021.

Rear-Admiral Sir David William Haslam (1923–2009) was educated at Bromsgrove School; he returned as a governor and lived opposite the school in Worcester Road until his death.

=== Medals for gallantry ===
Five Old Bromsgrovians are known to have been awarded the Victoria Cross:

- Sir George White (1835–1912), Commander-in-Chief, India, 1893–1899, Governor of Gibraltar 1900–1904
- Percy Thompson Dean (1877–1939)
- Eustace Jotham (1884–1915)
- Frank Bernard Wearne (1894–1917)
- Nigel Gray Leakey (1913–1941)

One old Bromsgrovian, Oliver Bryson, is known to have received the George Cross,

== See also ==
- List of the oldest schools in the United Kingdom
