= John Day Collis =

British headmaster and educational writer

John Day Collis (1816–1879) was a British headmaster and educational writer.

== Life ==
Collis, son of the Rev. Robert Fitzgerald Collis, prebendary of Kilconnell, County Galway, by Maria, daughter of Edward Bourke of Nun's Island, Galway, was born on 24 February 1816. After being educated at Rugby 1832–4 under Dr. Arnold, he entered Merton College, Oxford, as a postmaster in the latter year. In 1835 he became Eaton scholar of Worcester College, proceeding to gain his B.A. in 1836, M.A. in 1841, and B.D. and D.D. in 1860. He was elected to a fellowship at his college, and gained the Kennicott, and Pusey and Ellerton Hebrew scholarships, between 1839–41.

Having been nominated to the head-mastership of Bromsgrove in December 1842, that school, through his indomitable energy, grew to be one of the best educational establishments in England. The tercentenary of the grammar school was celebrated on 31 March 1853. In 1856, through his exertions, the chapel was built at a cost of £1,500, and new school rooms were erected and the old buildings enlarged and improved at a cost of £5,000.

From 1843-63 the formidable Dr Collis was Head of Bromsgrove. A tribute to Collis states that he was descended from Viscount Mayo, who lost his life in the rebellion of 1641 and was the son of Sir Richard Bourke and Gráinne O'Malley, his mother Gráinne O'Malley or Grace O'Malley (c. 1530 – c. 1603; also Gráinne O'Malley, Irish: Gráinne Ní Mháille) was Queen of Umaill, chieftain of the Ó Máille clan and a pirate in 16th century Ireland. She is sometimes known as "The Sea Queen of Connaught". Biographies of her have been written primarily in the 20th and 21st centuries by the historian Anne Chambers.

Eoghan Dubhdara Ó Máille was Gráinne's father, and his family was based in Clew Bay, County Mayo. He was chieftain of the Ó Máille clan and a direct descendant of its eponym, Maille mac Conall. The O'Malleys were one of the few seafaring families on the west coast, and they built a row of castles facing the sea to keep an eye on their territory.

Miles, the second Viscount Mayo was created a Baronet in the Baronetage of Nova Scotia in c. 1638; Dr Collis also descends from the Earls of Ormonde. It adds that he was fourteenth in descent from the youngest daughter of King Edward 1st of England. Such claims do not surprise one for he was a very strong character who stamped both his character and authority on the school and town. His impact on the latter was greater than any other Bromsgrove Headmaster. At one stage a third of the School was Irish. There were no school fixtures then but one of his pupils recalled:

‘Our Head then was Dr Collis (much beloved), an old Rugbeian of Arnold’s time and an Irishman to boot. Many of us were Irishmen by birth or descent. Hence one of our great football matches was Ireland v England on the Green or if you prefer it England v Ireland, albeit the paddies were not easily or often beaten in those days. We never played ‘foreign’ matches, saving one memorable occasion when an enthusiastic footballer and muscular curate begged us to meet his village team; a team consisting of the blacksmith and game keeper, big hulking players who knew as little of the science or rules of the game as they excelled in good humour, and in abundant weight and pluck. What a game that was to be sure!’

He was nominated an honorary canon of Worcester Cathedral in 1854, and in 1856 was offered, but declined, the colonial bishopric of Grafton and Armidale. From 1863 to 1865 he held the Grinfield lectureship on the Septuagint at Oxford. His connection with Bromsgrove was severed in 1867 by his appointment to the vicarage of Stratford-on-Avon. During his incumbency Stratford church was restored and improved, and he completed the formation of the water terrace in the churchyard. He was the founder and first warden of Trinity College school at Stratford, 27 Jan. 1872.

He married first, 18 June 1846, Josephine Martha, eldest daughter of John Chatfield Tyler of Kingswood, Gloucestershire, who died 16 October 1868; and secondly, 11 Oct. 1871, Elizabeth, daughter of Edward Castleman of Chettle, Dorsetshire, and widow of Rear-admiral Douglas Curry of Shottery Hall, Stratford-on-Avon.

Collis died at Shottery Hall 1 April 1879, and was buried in the Bromsgrove cemetery on 4 April.

== Publications ==
1. The Chief Rules of Greek Accentuation 1849
2. Exercises and Examination Papers 1851
3. The Chief Tenses of Latin Irregular Verbs 1854, thirty-four editions
4. Ordination and other Sermons 1854 and 1869
5. The Chief Tenses of Greek Irregular Verbs 1855, thirty-four editions
6. Praxis Græca three parts, 1855–6, many editions
7. Praxis Latina 1856
8. Praxis Iambica 1857, seven editions
9. Tirocinium Gallicum 1857, four editions
10. Historical Notes on the Parish Church of St. John the Baptist, Bromsgrove 1859
11. Pontes Classici No. I. A Stepping-stone from the beginning of Latin Grammar to Cæsar, 1860; and No. II. A Stepping-stone from the beginning of Greek Grammar to Xenophon, 1860
12. Ponticulus Latinus, the History of Rome to the Destruction of Carthage 1860
13. Ponticulus Græcus, Exercises from the Greek Testament, Æsop, and Xenophon 1860
14. Praxis Gallica 1864
15. Praxis Latina Primaria 1867
16. German Card of Irregular Verbs 1875
17. Pontes Latini eleventh edition, 1878
18. Pontes Græci 1879
19. The History of Bromsgrove School
