= Francis Foster Barham =

English religious writer

- Born: 1808; Penzance, England
- Died: 1871 (aged 62–63); Bath, England
- Occupation: Writer
- Known for: Alism

Francis Foster Barham (1808–1871), known as the Alist was an English religious writer who promoted a new religion called Alism.

== Life ==
The fifth son of Thomas Foster Barham (1766–1844), by his wife Mary Anne, daughter of the Rev. Mr. Morton, he was born 31 May 1808 at Leskinnick, Penzance, Cornwall, where his parents dwelt in independence and retirement. After a preliminary training in the grammar school of Penzance, he studied under one of his brothers near Epping Forest, and was then articled for five years (1826–31) to a solicitor at Devonport.

His family's wealth came from slavery on sugar estates in western Jamaica.

In his twenty-third year he was enrolled as an attorney, and settled in London, but ill-health prevented him from pursuing the practice of the law, and he took to writing for literary periodicals. Together with John Abraham Heraud he was joint editor and proprietor of the New Monthly Magazine from 1 July 1839 to 26 May 1840, when he retired from the editorship, with permission 'to contribute two sheets of matter to each number of the magazine, retaining exclusive property in his own articles'. During the fourteen years of his home in London, Barham's most extensive literary undertaking was the preparation of a new edition of Jeremy Collier's Ecclesiastical History of Great Britain. The study of oriental languages kindled in him a great love for philology, and his intense spiritual aspirations led him to attempt to found a new form of religion, which he called "Alism". He describes it as

the supreme central doctrine which combines and harmonizes all partial sections of truth in one divine universal system. After very prolonged and arduous researches at last discovered this supreme central doctrine, and gave it the name of Alism, a name derived from A, Al, or Alah, the most ancient and universal title of Deity in the Hebrew scripture. By Alism I therefore mean that eternal divinity, pure and universal, which includes and reconciles all divine truths whatsoever to be found in scripture or nature, in theology, theosophy, philosophy, science, or art.

Barham founded a society of Alists and also a Syncretic Society. He likewise attached himself to an æsthetic society which met at the house of James Pierrepont Greaves.

In 1844, he married Gertrude, daughter of the Rev. Thomas Grinfield, of Clifton, rector of Shirland, Derbyshire, and went to live at Clifton, Bristol. During his ten years' residence there, his time was principally occupied in preparing a revised version of the Old and New Testaments. He lived at Bath from 1854 until his death, which occurred in that city on 9 February 1871.

His brother Charles Foster Barham was a doctor and also president of the Royal Institution of Cornwall.

== Partial bibliography ==
His numerous printed works include:

1. The Adamus Exul of Grotius, or the Prototype of Paradise Lost. Now first translated from the Latin, London, 1839, octavo. This poem is said to be the prototype of Milton's Paradise Lost.
2. The Ecclesiastical History of Great Britain. By Jeremy Collier. New edition, with a life of the author, the controversial tracts connected with the history, notes, and an enlarged index, 9 volumes, London, 1840, octavo.
3. The Alist or Divine, a message to our times, London, 1840, octavo; three parts published at 6 d each.
4. The Political Works of Cicero. Translated from the original with dissertations and notes, 2 volumes, London, 1841–42, octavo.
5. Socrates. A Tragedy in five acts (and in verse), London, 1842, octavo.
6. The Life and Times of John Reuchlin or Capnion, the father of the German Reformation, London, 1843, duodecimo.
7. The Foster Barham Genealogy, London, 1844, octavo, privately printed.
8. Prospectus. The Alist, a monthly magazine of divinity and universal literature, London. 1845, octavo. No portion of the projected magazine was ever published.
9. An Odd Medley of Literary Curiosities, original and selected, London. 1845, octavo. This volume contains a memoir of James Pierrepont Greaves.
10. A Key to Alism and the Highest Initiations, Sacred and Secular. With Miscellaneous Pieces, original and select, London, 1847, octavo.
11. The Bible Revised. A carefully corrected translation of the Old and New Testament, London, 1848, octavo. In three parts, containing the Book of Ecclesiastes, the Song of Solomon, and the Book of Micah.
12. The New Bristol Guide, a poem, Bristol, 1850, octavo.
13. The Pleasures of Piety, a poem, London, 1850, octodecimo.
14. A Life of Edward Colston of Bristol.
15. Improved Monotessaron, a complete authentic Gospel Life of Christ, combining the words of the four Gospels in a revised version and an orderly chronological arrangement, London, 1862, duodecimo.
16. Lokman's Arabic Fables, literally translated into English (word for word), Bath, 1869, duodecimo.
17. A Rhymed Harmony of the Gospels. By F. Barham and Isaac Pitman. Printed both in the phonetic and the customary spelling, London 1870, octavo.
18. The Writings of Solomon, comprising the Book of Proverbs, Ecclesiastes, Song of Solomon, and Psalms lxxii. cxxvii. Translated. Printed both in phonetic and in the customary spelling, London, 1870, sextodecimo.
19. A Revised Version of the Prophecies of Hosea and Micah, London, 1870, octavo.
20. The Book of Job, newly translated from the original. Printed both in the phonetic and the customary spelling, London, 1871, octavo.
21. An Elucidated Translation of St. John's Epistles, from the Greek and Syriac, with a devotional commentary, London, 1871, octavo.
22. The Book of Psalms, translated from the Hebrew and the Syriac. By F. Barham and Edward Hare, London, 1871, octavo.

Barham left behind him 116 lb. weight of manuscript, much of it in a small handwriting. It consists of treatises on Christianity, missions, church government, temperance, poems in blank verse, rhymed poetry, and a few dramas. From these Isaac Pitman selected about seven pounds, and printed them in his Memorial of Francis Barham, London 1873, octavo. This volume, which is mostly in the phonetic character, contains reprints of the Memoir of James Greaves, Lokman's Fables, the Life of Reuchlin, and the Rhymed Harmony of the Gospels.
