= Henry Barham =

English writer on natural history

Henry Barham F.R.S. (1670?–1726) was an English writer on natural history.

== Life ==
He was born about 1670, and was descended from the Barhams of Barham Court in Kent. He has often been confused with his son, Henry Barham, M.D., who became the owner of several sugar plantations and a significant quantity of slaves in the Colony of Jamaica. The main events of the life of the elder Henry Barham are recorded by himself in one of his letters to Sir Hans Sloane.

His father, a physician, intended to give him a university education, but died before he could carry out his wishes. As the mother married soon afterwards, the boy, then about fourteen years of age, was left to his own resources, and became apprentice to a surgeon. This situation he left to become surgeon's mate in the Vanguard, from which he was promoted to be master surgeon in another man-of-war. He went to Spain, thence to Madras, and thence to Jamaica. As in 1720, he refers to his son as having practised physic and surgery in Jamaica for the last twenty years, he himself had probably settled in the island twenty years before the end of the century.

According to his own account, he obtained a lucrative practice, and was appointed surgeon-major of the military forces in Jamaica. About 1716, he came to England and settled at Chelsea, devoting his chief attention to the rearing of the silkworm, and the manufacture of silk, on which subject he published a treatise in 1719. His name appears in 1717 on the list of members of the Royal Society, and he states also that shortly after he came to England he was made free of the Company of Surgeons, but his hopes of obtaining the diploma of M.D. do not appear to have been fulfilled, for the only change that occurs in his designation on the roll of the Royal Society is from "Mr." to "Esquire."

In his application, in 1720, for the situation of mineral superintendent to a company formed to prosecute silver mining in Jamaica, he stated that his business prospects were so good that he could not sacrifice them for less than £500 a year. He received the situation on his own terms; but the enterprise, which had been undertaken chiefly through his representations, proved a complete failure, and though a year's salary was due to him it was never paid. He continued, however, to reside in Jamaica till his death at Spanish Town in May 1726. A memorial tablet is in the cathedral at Spanish Town.

== Naturalist ==
Barham states that after he came to Jamaica he "read many books, especially physical." His letters and manuscripts indicate that in early life his education had been neglected; but although sometimes led astray by his own ideas, he possessed a knowledge of the fauna and flora of Jamaica. Logwood, now common there, was introduced by him in 1715.

== Works ==
Sir Hans Sloane, who refers to him in terms of high commendation, received from him many valuable communications, of which he made large use in his Natural History of Jamaica. Among these was a treatise, Hortus Americanus, sent in 1711. This treatise was published in 1794 with a preface in which it is stated to be the work of Henry Barham, M.D., who, it is added, practised as a physician in Jamaica from the beginning of the century, and after acquiring large property by marriage returned to England in 1740 and settled at Staines near Egham. The Henry Barham thus referred to was the son of Henry Barham, F.R.S., but that the father was the author of the book is proved beyond all doubt by letters in the Sloane manuscripts (4036). Henry Barham, F.R.S., wrote also a History of Jamaica, which his son, after his death, sent to Sir Hans Sloane, "to see the best method of printing it", but it was never published. The original copy, in the handwriting of the father, and inscribed "wrote by Henry Barham, Senr. F.R.S.," is in the British Museum. In another copy, in a different hand, there is a note by Edward Long erroneously attributing the work to Henry Barham, M.D.

Barham also wrote two papers for the Royal Society: An Account of a Fiery Meteor seen in Jamaica to strike the Earth; and Observations on the Produce of the Silkworm and of Silk in England, 1719, Abrev. vi. page 426.

== Dr Henry Barham the Younger ==
Dr Henry Barham (1692–1746), the son, owned a plantation named Spring Plantation, which produced sugar and boasted a large population of African slaves. In 1728, he married a widow named Mary Heith, and inherited the Jamaican plantation of Mesopotamia in western Jamaica. Mary had lost two previous husbands, Ephraim Stephenson and a man named Heith.

After taking control of Mesopotamia, the younger Barham borrowed from several Kingston merchants, and purchased more slaves to increase the sugar production on his estates. His plantations in Westmoreland Parish thrived, and he generated a lot of wealth from sugar and rum sales in the 1730s. In 1731, however, his sister Elizabeth died at Mesopotamia, and his wife Mary and her sister Sarah Arcedeckne both died there four years later. In 1736, as a result, the younger Henry Barham migrated to England.

Between 1727 and 1736, Barham had tripled the slave population at Mesopotamia to 248. Barham left the management of his estate to his medical colleague, Dr James Paterson. But even though he now resided in England, Barham maintained his connections to Jamaica. There, he married again, this time to another wealthy widow from Jamaica, Elizabeth Smith Foster Ayscough, and inherited from her five more Jamaican plantations and 768 slaves, valued at about £34,000.

Barham had no children of his own, and he inherited seven step-children from Elizabeth's two previous marriages. He made Elizabeth's son, Joseph, his heir, under the stipulation that he take the name Barham in order to inherit Mesopotamia. The boy complied, and changed his name to Joseph Foster Barham I to become his heir. In 1746, Barham died and Elizabeth ran the estate until 1750, when Joseph was old enough to assume control of Mesopotamia.

In 1746, the younger Henry Barham died leaving his property to his wife Elizabeth and his step-son Joseph. Barham's personal estate was valued at over £22,000, of which 287 slaves were valued at nearly £14,000.
