= Aulay Macaulay (writer) =

Scottish writer and clergyman of the Church of England

Aulay Macaulay (1758–1819) was a Scottish writer and clergyman of the Church of England.

== Life ==
He was the eldest son of John Macaulay, by his second wife Margaret Campbell; Colin Macaulay and Zachary Macaulay were brothers, and Thomas Babington Macaulay was his nephew. He graduated M.A. at Glasgow University in 1778. After acting for three years as tutor to the sons of Joseph Foster Barham I at Bedford, he took holy orders and obtained a curacy at Claybrooke, Leicestershire. He remained there until 1789, when he became rector of Frolesworth; but then resigned the living after a year, in 1790. He had been admitted as a sizar in 1785 at Sidney Sussex College, Cambridge, but is not known to have graduated.

In 1793 Macaulay went on a tour in Holland and Belgium, an account of which he wrote for the 1793–4; and next year, as travelling tutor to a son of Sir Walter Farquhar, he visited the court of Charles William Ferdinand, Duke of Brunswick-Wolfenbüttel, and gave English lessons to his daughter Caroline of Brunswick, who later married the future George IV of the United Kingdom. In 1796, after his return, Macaulay was presented by his brother-in-law Thomas Babington to the living of Rothley.

In 1815 Macaulay made another tour on the continent, and four years later, on 24 February 1819, died of apoplexy.

== Works ==
Macaulay published sermons, and:

- Essays on various Subjects of Taste and Criticism, 1780.
- Two Discourses on Sovereign Power and Liberty of Conscience, translated from the Latin of Gerhard Noodt, 1781.

While in residence at Glasgow Macaulay contributed to Ruddiman's Magazine, under the signature "Academicus". For John Nichols's History of Leicestershire, he wrote The History and Antiquities of Claybrooke, in the County of Leicester, including the Chapelries of Wibtoft, Little Wigston, and the Hamlets of Bittesby and Ullesthorpe. His European travels were written up for the Gentleman's Magazine.

== Family ==
Macaulay married Ann, daughter of John Heyrick the town clerk of Leicester; they had eight sons. The abolitionist Elizabeth Heyrick was Ann's sister-in-law.

The second son, Colin Campbell Macaulay (1799–1853), became a partner in a firm of solicitors at Leicester. He was president of the Leicester Literary and Philosophical Society in 1847 and contributed to their transactions. He died on 20 October 1853 at Knighton Lodge, Leicester, and was buried at Rothley. By his wife Mary Kendall, eldest daughter of Richard Warner Wood, he left a son and a daughter. The politician Kenneth Macaulay was his younger brother.

== Notes ==
Attribution

This article incorporates text from a publication now in the public domain: Lee, Sidney, ed. (1893). "Macaulay, Aulay". Dictionary of National Biography. Vol. 34. London: Smith, Elder & Co.
