= Tessa Rajak =

British historian and academic

- Born: 2 August 1946 (age 80); London, England
- Known for: Judaism in the Hellenistic and Roman periods. The writings of Josephus.

Academic work
- Institutions: University of Reading

Tessa Rajak (née Goldsmith, born 2 August 1946 in London) is a British historian and Emeritus Professor of Ancient history at the University of Reading. She is also a Senior Associate of the Oxford Centre for Hebrew and Jewish Studies and Fellow of Somerville College, Oxford. Her research focuses primarily on Judaism in the Hellenistic and Roman periods, and she is an expert on the writings of Josephus.

== Career ==
Tessa Rajak was educated at Somerville College, Oxford, submitting her D.Phil. thesis on 'Flavius Josephus: Jewish History and the Greek World' in the Faculty of Literae Humaniores (Classics) in 1974. She later became Professor of Ancient History at the University of Reading. From 1995–6 she was Grinfield Lecturer on the Septuagint at Oxford; her book Translation and Survival: The Greek Bible of the Ancient Jewish Diaspora (Oxford University Press 2009) is based on the six lectures which she gave during this time. Rajak was editor of the Journal of Jewish Studies from 2000 to 2003. She retired from the University of Reading in December 2008. A symposium in her honour, entitled 'Jews, Christians, Greeks, Romans: Cultural and Religious Interactions', was held at Reading on 25 June 2009. From 2012 to 2015 she was co-investigator (with Professor Martin Goodman and Dr. Andrea Schatz) on a project funded by the Arts and Humanities Research Council and entitled 'The Reception of Josephus in Jewish Culture from the 18th Century to the Present'.

== Selected publications ==
Monographs

- Flavius Josephus. Jewish History and the Greek World. Dissertation, University of Oxford 1974.
- Josephus. The Historian and his Society. Fortress Press, Philadelphia 1984, ISBN 0-800-60717-1.
- The Jewish Dialogue with Greece and Rome. Studies in Cultural and Social Interaction (= Arbeiten zur Geschichte des antiken Judentums und des Urchristentums. Band 48). Brill, Leiden 2000, ISBN 90-04-11285-5.
- Translation and survival. The Greek Bible of the Ancient Jewish Diaspora. Oxford University Press, Oxford 2009, ISBN 978-0-199-55867-4.

Edited volumes

- with John North and Judith Lieu: The Jews Among Pagans and Christians in the Roman Empire. Routledge, London 1992, ISBN 0-415-04972-5.
- with Gillian Clark: Philosophy and Power in the Graeco-Roman World. Essays in Honour of Miriam Griffin. Oxford University Press, Oxford 2002, ISBN 0-198-29990-7.
- with Sarah Pearce, James Aitken and Jennifer Dines: Jewish Perspectives on Hellenistic Rulers. University of California Press, Berkeley 2007, ISBN 978-0-520-25084-0.
- with Claudia D. Bergmann, Benedikt Kranemann and Rebecca Ullrich, The Power of Pslam in Post-Biblical Judaism, Brill, Leiden, 2023

== Personal life ==
Rajak is the daughter of Lithuanian-English journalist S. J. Goldsmith. She is married to Harry Rajak, Professor Emeritus of Law at the University of Sussex.
