= Mount Haven Hotel =

Hotel in Cornwall, England

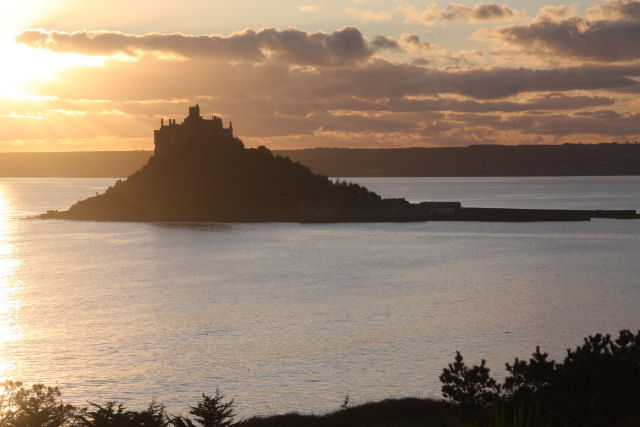
- St Michael's Mount at sunset from the hotel

- Location within Southwest Cornwall

General information
- Location: Turnpike Road, Marazion, Cornwall, England, UK
- Coordinates: 50°7′23″N 5°27′40″W

Website
- Official site

Mount Haven Hotel is a hotel near the coast on the eastern side of the town of Marazion, Cornwall, England, UK, several miles east of Penzance. It is next to Chymorvah House and has panoramic views of St Michael's Mount and bay.

The hotel's restaurant has been awarded an AA Rosette and in the summer tables are put out on the terrace which overlooks St Michael's Mount.
