= Bromsgrove International School Thailand =

- โรงเรียนนานาชาติบรอมส์โกรฟ ประเทศไทย

Location
- Suwinthawong Road; Bangkok; Thailand
- Coordinates: 13.819503°N 100.797274°E

Information
- Type: Independent British curriculum school, day and boarding
- Motto: Deo Regi Vicino (For God, for King, for Neighbour)
- Established: 2002
- Founders: Thiti Pawakranond
- Headmaster: Mr.Giles Montier
- Gender: Co-educational
- Age: 2 to 18
- Houses: Edwards, Walters, Taylor
- Website: http://www.bromsgrove.ac.th

Bromsgrove International School Thailand (BIST; Thai: โรงเรียนนานาชาติบรอมส์โกรฟ ประเทศไทย, RTGS: Rong Rian Nana Chat Bromkrop Prathet Thai) is a British curriculum day and boarding school with two campuses in Min Buri District, Bangkok, Thailand, catering for students between the ages of 2 and 18. The school is located within the grounds of a 36-hole golf course within 15 kilometres (9 mi) of Bangkok International Airport (Suvannabhumi) and 30 kilometres (19 mi) from central Bangkok. It provides an alternative for students in Southeast Asia to study in a UK boarding school closer to home.

The school has two campuses which cater for students from Early Years to Year 13 (3–18 years old) including IGCSE and since 2008, A levels. It is affiliated with Bromsgrove School in England, founded in 1553.

== Affiliations ==
The school is operated by a private company, Windsor Education Co Ltd.

It operates under a license granted by Bromsgrove School in Bromsgrove, near Birmingham, England, in 2004. Close ties exist between the two schools with scholarships for Thailand students to study in the UK, a Bromsgrove UK presence on the Board of Governors and staff and management visits between campuses.

Bromsgrove gained accreditation as an examination centre by CIE in 2007.

In May 2008, Bromsgrove affiliated with Daewon Foreign Language High School in Seoul, South Korea. A substantial number of students from Daewon board and study at Bromsgrove for a part of their secondary school career, following a combination the British and Korean curricula. Daewon is a selective school in Korea ranked by The Wall Street Journal as one of the top schools in the world with a high success rate for entry to Ivy League universities.

Bromsgrove achieved accreditation by the Council for International Schools (CIS) in 2011. The school has been a member of the International Schools Association of Thailand (ISAT) since 2003, and competes in the Bangkok International School Athletic Conference (BISAC).

== Campus ==
Both the Early Years and preparatory-secondary campuses offer academic, sporting and extra curriculum facilities.

The Early Years Campus is situated close to a growing suburban community. The Preparatory and Secondary School is located on the edge of the city in a golf course setting with views of the local countryside.
