= William Foster Barham =

British writer (1802–1845)

William Foster Barham (22 October 1802 – 28 January 1845) was an English poet.

Barham was the third son of the musician Thomas Foster Barham. He was born at Marazion, in Cornwall, 22 October 1802. He was educated in the grammar schools of Bodmin and Leeds, and then proceeded to Trinity College, Cambridge. His family's wealth came from slavery on sugar estates in western Jamaica.

He won the Porson Prize in 1821 and 1822, and graduated B.A. in 1824 as twenty-second senior optime, second in the first class of the classical tripos, and second chancellor's medallist. He went out M.A. in 1827. His death occurred in Kent on 28 January 1845.

He was the author of an unpublished poem on Moskow. His Greek versions of portions of Othello and Julius Cæsar are printed in successive editions of Translations which have obtained the Porson Prize in the University of Cambridge from 1817 (3rd edition, Cambridge: E. Johnson, 1871).
