= John Lowden =

British art historian (born 1953)

John Hopkins Lowden (born 1 May 1953, d. 27 January 2026) FBA was a British art historian who was Professor of the History of Art at the Courtauld Institute, which he joined in 1982.

Lowden was a graduate of Cambridge University and previously taught at St. Andrews. His specialism was in illuminated manuscripts and Gothic ivories.

Awards

Gründler Book Prize

== Selected publications ==
- Early Christian and Byzantine Art. London: Phaidon Press, 1997. ISBN 0714831689
