= Thomas Foster Barham (musician) =

English musician and writer

Thomas Foster Barham (1766–1844) was an English musician and miscellaneous writer.

== Life ==
Barham's Name Act 1748
- Act of Parliament
- Parliament of Great Britain
- Long title: An Act to enable Joseph Foster Barham Esquire and his Issue to take and use the Surname of Barham, pursuant to the Will of Henry Barham Esquire, deceased.
- Citation: 22 Geo. 2. c. 14 Pr.
- Territorial extent: Great Britain

Dates
- Royal assent: 22 March 1749
- Commencement: 29 November 1748 (Note: Start of session.)

Status: Current legislation

Barham was the third son of Joseph Foster of Jamaica, who in 1750 took the name of Barham by authority of a private act of Parliament, Barham's Name Act 1748 (22 Geo. 2. c. 14 Pr.), and in accordance with the will of Henry Barham. His family's wealth was generated by sugar and slavery on the estates of western Jamaica.

He was born in Bedford, 8 October 1766, and educated at St. John's College, Cambridge, where he matriculated in 1784 but did not graduate. After his university course he travelled on the Continent. On his return he became connected with the mercantile house of Plummer & Co., but ill-health obliged him to leave London, and to retire to the West of England, where he finally settled, at Leskinnick, near Penzance, Cornwall. He died there on 25 February 1844. He married in 1790 Mary Ann, eldest daughter of the Rev. Joshua Morton, of Blackheath, and by this lady had six children, of whom Charles, Francis, Thomas, and William are notable.

== Works ==
- Letter from a Trinitarian to a Unitarian, Penzance, 1811.
- Musical Meditations, consisting of original compositions, vocal and instrumental, Lond. 1811, 2nd set 1815.
- Abdallah or the Arabian Martyr, a Christian drama in three acts [and in verse], Lond. 1820, 2nd edit., Penzance, 1821.
- Elijah, a sacred poem in four cantos, Lond. 1822.
- Colonel Gardiner, a Christian drama in three parts, Lond. 1823.
- Pergolesi's celebrated Stabat Mater or Calvary; with English words written for the purpose, substituted in the place of the ancient Latin verses, and the instrumental parts arranged for the organ or pianoforte, &c., 1829.
- Lander Africanus. A musical drama, Penzance, 1834.
- Reliquiæ Seriæ, or Christian Musings. By Ἐλάχιστος, Lond. 1836.
