= Thomas Grinfield =

English clergyman and hymn-writer

Thomas Grinfield (27 April 1788, Bath, Somerset – 8 April 1870, Clifton, Bristol) was an English clergyman and hymn-writer.

== Life ==
Thomas Grinfield was the son of Thomas Grinfield of Bristol and Anna Joanna Barham, and the brother of Edward William Grinfield. He was born at Bath in 1788, and educated at Wingfield, near Trowbridge, and afterwards at Trinity College, Cambridge, where he proceeded B.A. in 1811. He was ordained in 1813. He married his first cousin, Mildred Foster Barham; became curate at St Sidwells, Exeter; then rector of Shirland, Derbyshire; he subsequently resided at Clifton, Bristol, and was for twenty-three years curate in charge of St Mary le Port Church, Bristol. He died at Clifton on 8 April 1870, and was buried in the cemetery at Weston-super-Mare. Though he published little, his compositions were numerous, especially his sermons. Studious and contemplative, he mingled little with society. He was an accomplished scholar and poet. As well as the works listed below, he wrote a large number of small poems and lectures, many of which were published in the Weston Mercury. There remain unpublished several manuscripts, especially a valuable series of theological lectures.

== Works ==
- Epistles and Miscellaneous Poems, 1815
- The Omnipotence of God, with other Sacred Poems, 1824
- The Visions of Patmos, 1827
- A Century of Original Sacred Songs
- Sacred Poems
- Fifty Sermons by Robert Hall, from Grinfield's Notes, 1843, dedicated to Thomas Chalmers, and part of the publication of works of Robert Hall
- The Moral Influence of Shakespeare's Plays, 1850
- The History of Preaching (ed. Canon Eden, 1880, with preface and memoir)
