= St Michael's Way =

Footpath in Cornwall, United Kingdom

St Michael’s Way
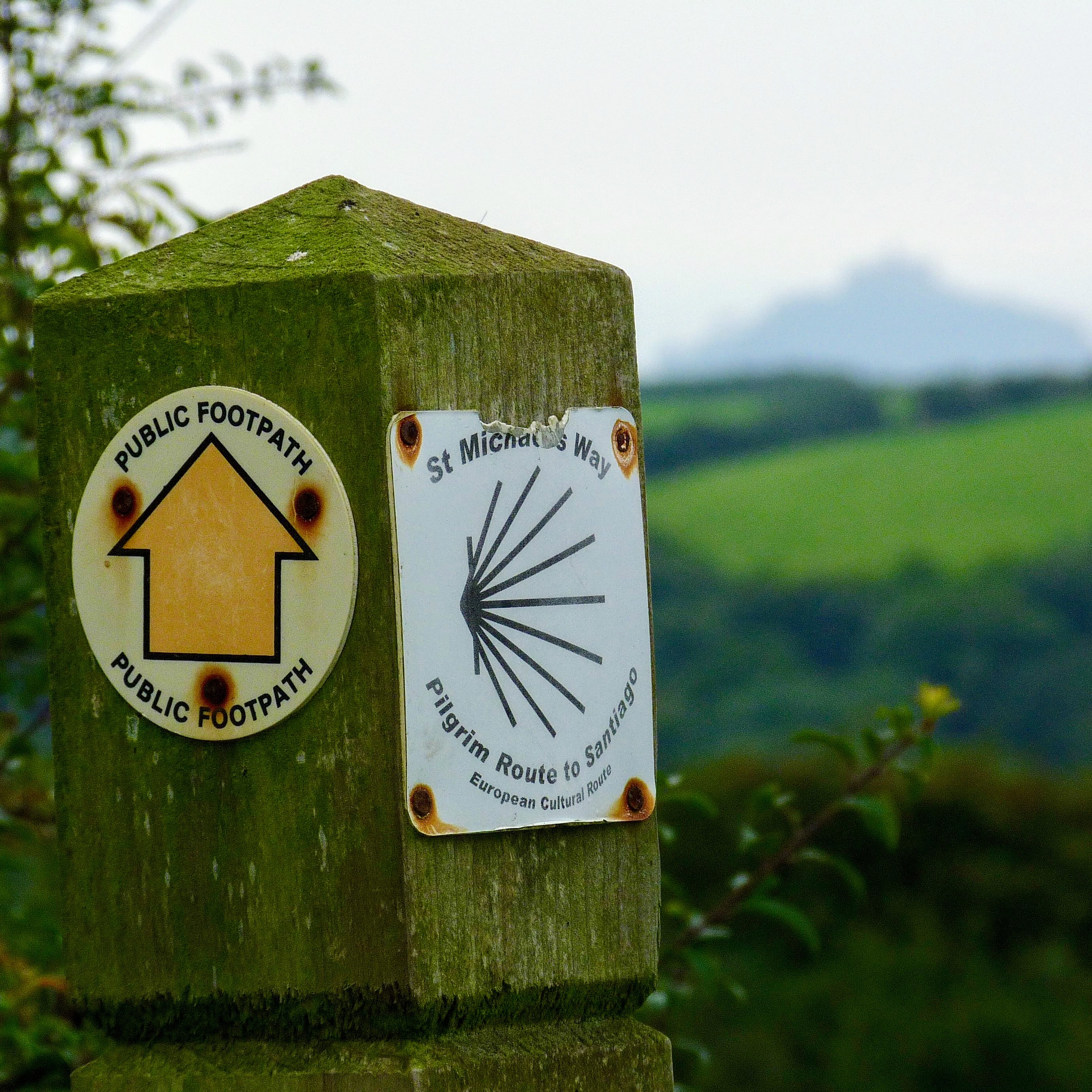
- Waymark on a Public Footpath
- Length: 12.5 mi (20.1 km)
- Location: Cornwall, England.
- Established: 1994
- Trailheads: Lelant – St Michael’s Mount
- Use: Hiking, Pilgrimage
- Highest point: Knill's Monument 170 metres (558 ft)
- Lowest point: St Michael’s Mount causeway 0 metres (0 ft)
- Sights: Lelant church, Knill's Monument, Trencrom Hill, St Michael’s Mount
- Hazards: St Michael's Mount causeway is submerged during high tide. Crossing on foot should only be attempted at low tide in appropriate weather conditions.

St Michael’s Way (Cornish: Fordh Sen Mighal) is a waymarked long-distance footpath in Cornwall. It runs for 12.5 miles (20 km) from Lelant on Cornwall’s north coast to St Michael’s Mount on the south coast.

== History ==
Established in 1994, the route follows a path likely taken by early Christian pilgrims, missionaries and travellers from Ireland and Wales that would have enabled them to travel southwards towards Continental European sites of pilgrimage whilst avoiding the perilous journey by sea around the southwestern tip of Britain.

== Description of route ==
St Michael's Way has been signposted and waymarked in both directions using a stylistic shell based on the Council of Europe's sign for pilgrim routes. The directional arrows are coloured yellow for footpaths, blue for bridleways and red for byways; Cornwall Council has chosen to use black arrows on public roads. Pilgrims arriving at the Pilgrim's Office at Santiago de Compostela Cathedral who have walked St Michael's Way as well as the Camino Inglés from La Coruña may be awarded the Compostela certificate of accomplishment on production of a suitably stamped Credencial.

Approximately a third of the route coincides with the South West Coast Path National Trail: specifically, the initial segment from Lelant to the western end of Carbis Bay, and the final segment from Eastern Green to Marazion and St Michael's Mount. St Michael’s Way is named and shown as a series of green diamonds on the Ordnance Survey 1:25000 scale map, although it is not indicated on the 1:50000 scale map.

The full route involves a significant westward excursion from Ludgvan church to Gulval church, then returning eastwards from Eastern Green (near Penzance) to Marazion along the Long Rock beach segment of the coast path. There is a shorter alternative route (also waymarked) southwards between Ludgvan church and Marazion that reduces the trail length by approximately 3 miles (4.8 km); however, the shorter route is riskier as it involves crossing the A30 and A394 roads without the assistance of designated pedestrian crossings, as well as crossing the Penzance-to-St Erth railway line at a pedestrian level crossing.
