= Carbis Bay =

Village in Cornwall, England

Coordinates: 50.19659°N 5.46505°W

Carbis Bay: Cornish: Porthreptor
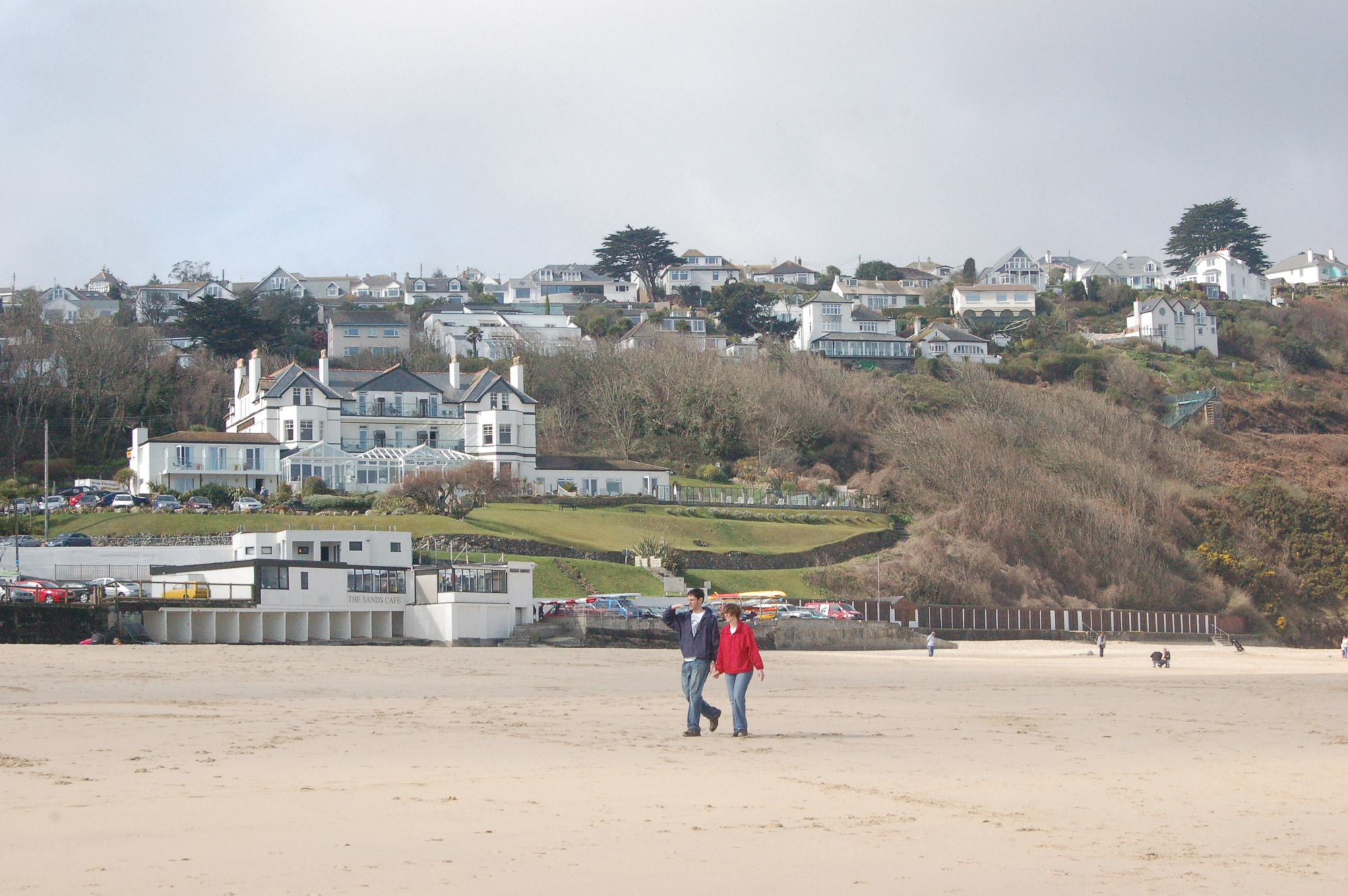
- Beach at Carbis Bay with the Carbis Bay Hotel behind

- Location within Cornwall
- Population: 3,970
- Civil parish: St Ives
- Unitary authority: Cornwall
- Ceremonial county: Cornwall
- Region: South West
- Country: England
- Sovereign state: United Kingdom
- Post town: ST. IVES
- Police: Devon and Cornwall
- Fire: Cornwall
- Ambulance: South Western
- UK Parliament: St Ives

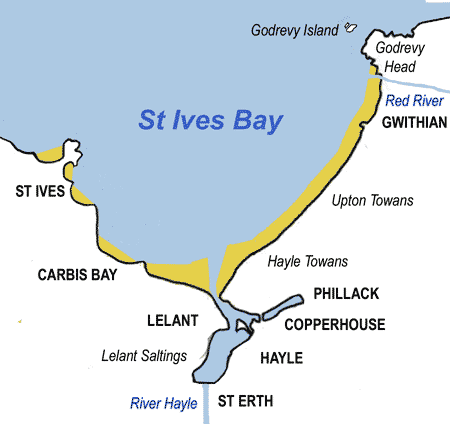
Sketch map showing Carbis Bay within St Ives Bay

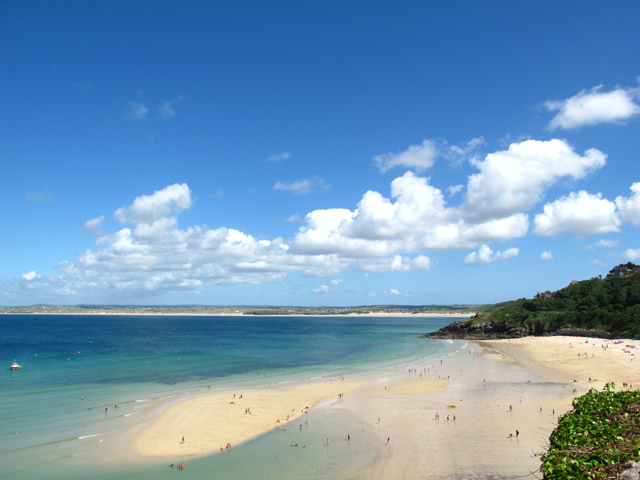
Carbis Bay from St Ives

Carbis Bay (Cornish: Porthreptor) is a seaside resort and village in Cornwall, England. It lies 1 mile (1.6 km) southeast of St Ives, on the western coast of St Ives Bay, on the Atlantic coast. The South West Coast Path passes above the beach.

== History ==
Carbis Bay is perhaps best known as the location of the 47th G7 summit in 2021.

== Geography ==
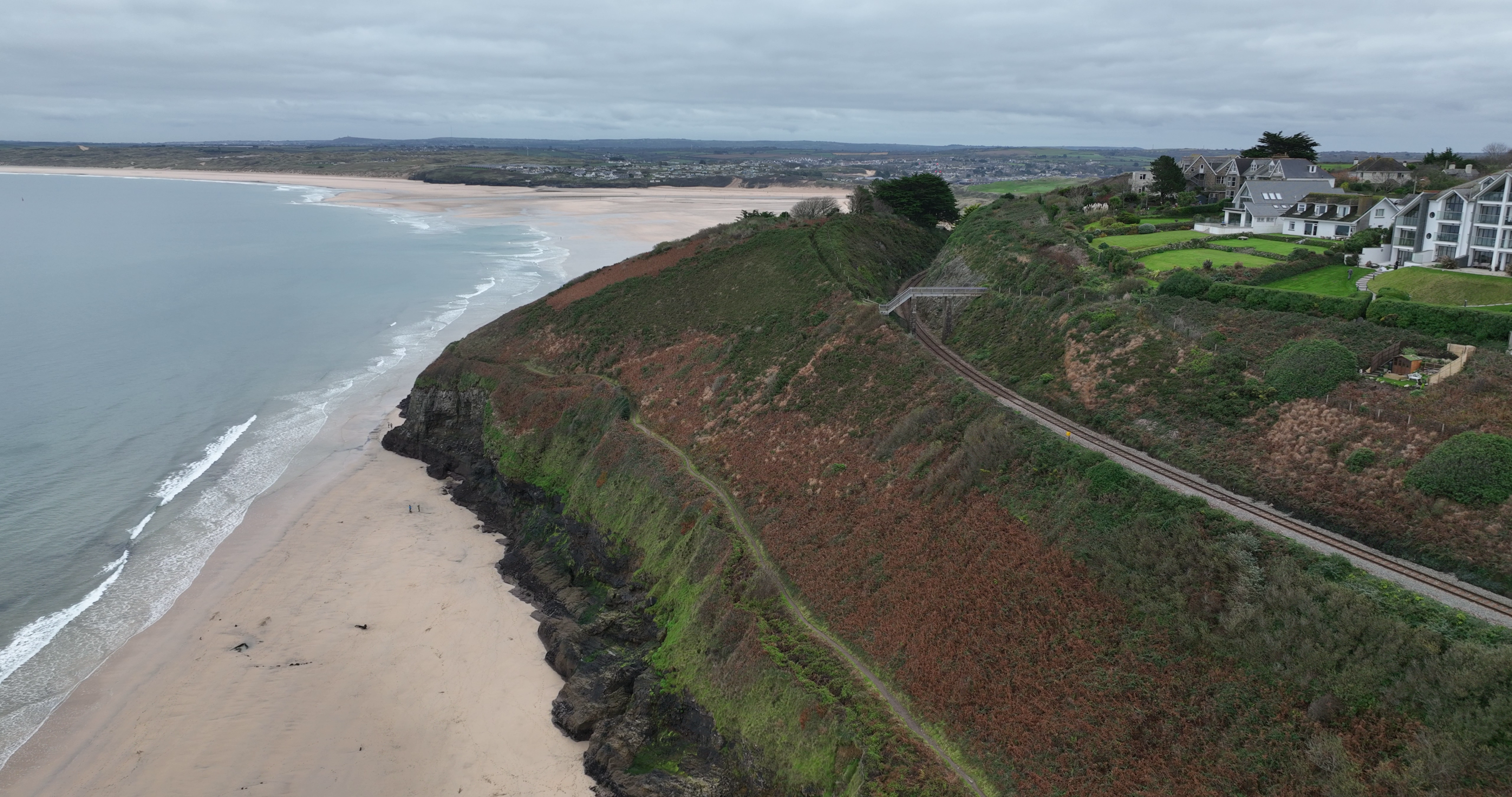
Aerial view of Carbis Bay, Cornwall, England.

Carbis Bay is almost contiguous with the town of St Ives and is in St Ives civil parish (part of the area served by St Ives Town Council), which encompasses St Ives, Carbis Bay, Lelant and Halsetown. The 2001 census gave the combined population of Carbis Bay and Lelant as 3,482. Lelant, an older settlement which is one mile to the south-east, Carbis Bay and St Ives are linked by the A3074 road which joins the A30 at Rose-an-Grouse. Carbis Bay railway station, above the beach, is one of five railway stations on the St Ives Bay Line which joins the mainline at St Erth railway station, which is also at Rose-an-Grouse. St Erth station is the junction for the main line to London Paddington.

Carbis Bay overlooks the small bay of the same name (Cornish: Porth reb Tor, meaning "cove beside the eminence", part of St Ives Bay) which is bounded to the north by Porthminster Point and to the east by Hawk's Point and contains a popular family beach. Hawk's Point is within the Hayle Estuary and Carrack Gladden Site of Special Scientific Interest (SSSI) and in the Victorian era was known locally for its pleasure grounds. The garden had a tea house and grotto; it was a venue for Sunday School outings and Band of Hope galas. By 1880, the proprietor William Payne claimed in an advertisement that it was "the largest establishment of the kind in the West ...".

== Mining ==
Wheal Providence mine in Carbis Bay is the type locality of the rare mineral Connellite.

== Local facilities ==
=== Notable structures ===
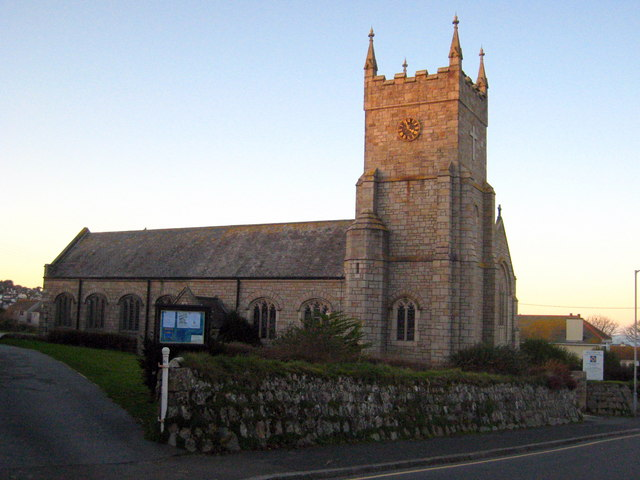
Carbis Bay parish church

The parish church, which is dedicated to St Anta and All Saints, contains a ring of ten bells. This was the largest peal in a Cornish parish church until St Keverne's bells were increased to ten in 2001. The Carbis Bay Hotel, on the seafront, was built in 1894 by Silvanus Trevail. Behind the village stands the Knill Monument, known locally as "The Steeple", a 50-foot (15 m) high monument to John Knill, a mayor of nearby St Ives during the 18th century.

=== Transport ===
Carbis Bay is connected to the national railway network by the St Erth to St Ives branch line. St Erth is on the Cornish main line linking London Paddington to Penzance. Road coaches also operate to and from London and St Erth on the National Express (London–Penzance) service. There are local buses to and from St Ives / St Erth / Hayle / Penzance / Helston and other areas. Overnight travel services include the Night Riviera sleeper train between Paddington and Penzance via St Erth. A night coach via London Heathrow (arriving 05.30am) and London Victoria (arriving 06.30am), calls at Carbis Bay and West Cornwall.

=== Schools ===
St Uny Primary School, a Church of England School voluntarily controlled by the Diocese of Truro, is situated in Carbis Bay.

== G7 Summit ==
In June 2021, Carbis Bay hosted the 47th G7 summit.

== Cornish wrestling ==
Cornish wrestling tournaments were held on Longstone Down, Longstone, which is now part of Carbis Bay.
