= Lelant =

Coordinates: 50°11′02″N 5°26′24″W

Lelant: Cornish: Lannanta
- Village
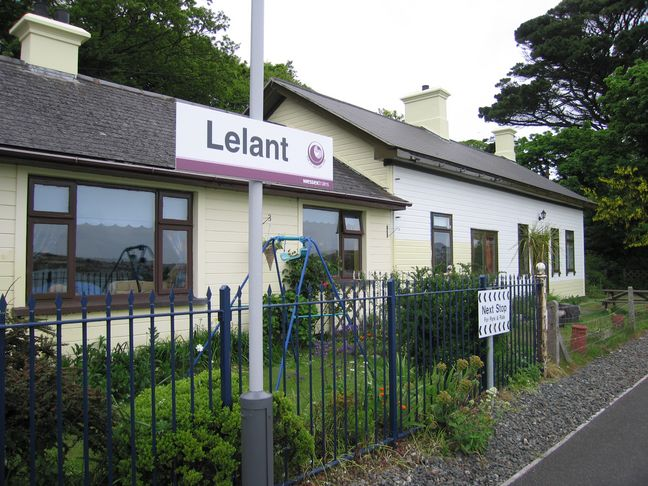
- The railway station and old station building. The building is now a private house.

- Location within Cornwall
- OS grid reference: SW544372
  - London: 300 mi (480 km) ENE
- Civil parish: St Ives
- Unitary authority: Cornwall
- Ceremonial county: Cornwall
- Region: South West
- Country: England
- Sovereign state: United Kingdom
- Post town: ST. IVES
- Postcode district: TR26
- Dialling code: 01736
- Police: Devon and Cornwall
- Fire: Cornwall
- Ambulance: South Western
- UK Parliament: St Ives

Lelant (Cornish: Lannanta) or Uny Lelant is a village in the civil parish of St Ives in, west Cornwall, England, UK. It is on the west side of the Hayle Estuary, about 2 1/2 miles (4.0 km) southeast of St Ives and one mile (1.6 km) west of Hayle. The village is part of the Lelant and Carbis Bay ward on Cornwall Council, and also the St Ives Parliamentary constituency. The birth, marriage, and death registration district is Penzance. Its population at the 2011 census was 3,892 The South West Coast Path, which follows the coast of south west England from Somerset to Dorset passes through Lelant, along the estuary and above Porth Kidney Sands.

== History ==
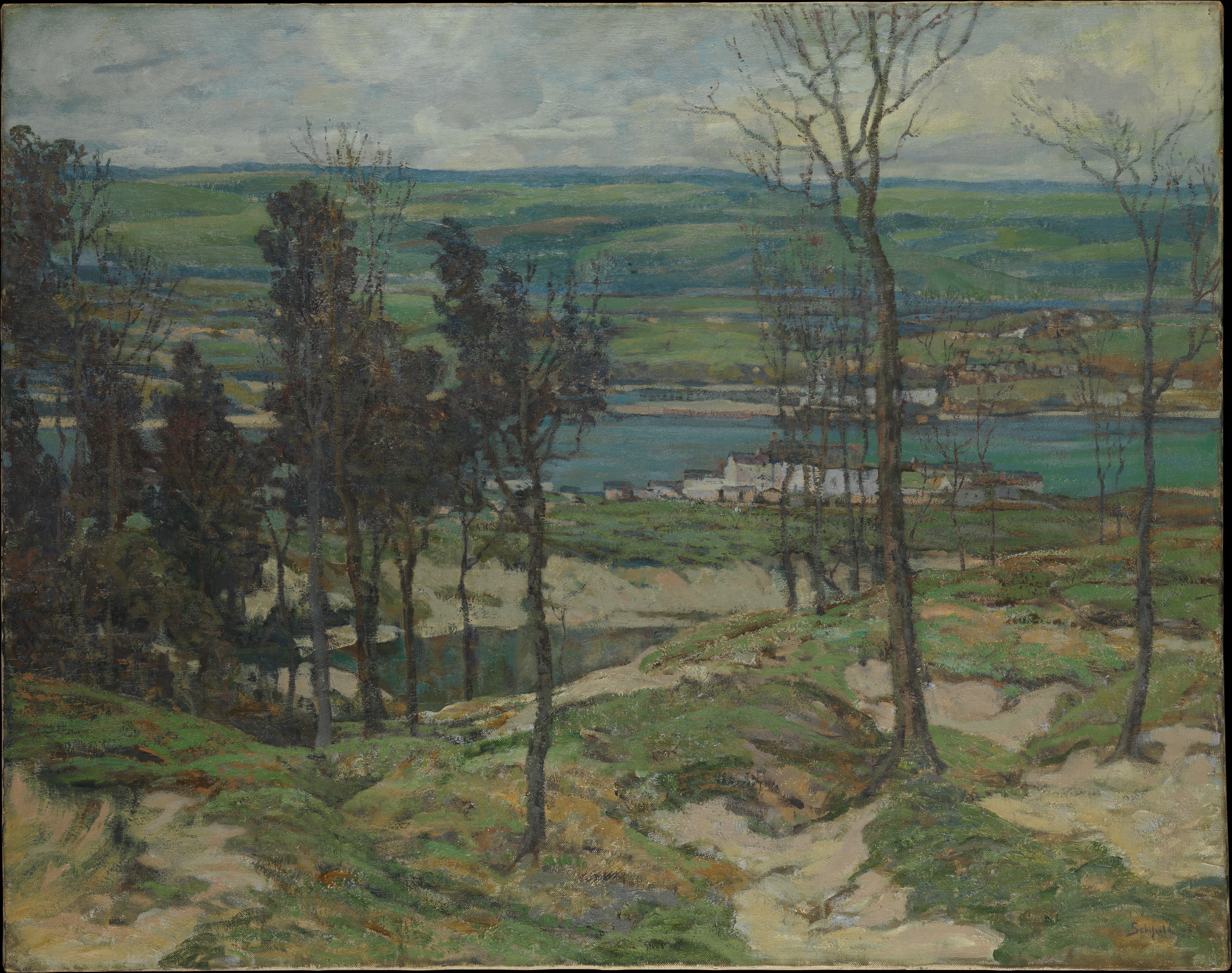
Sand dunes Near Lelant, Cornwall, by Walter Elmer Schofield

The name is derived from the Cornish lann and Anta, meaning church-site of Anta. The earliest attested spelling is Lananta in about 1170. Nothing is known about Anta, and Lelant parish church is dedicated to St Uny. However, Carbis Bay church is dedicated to St Anta. Arthur Langdon (1896) records eight stone crosses in the parish, of which four are in the churchyard; the other crosses are at Brunian Cairn, Lelant Lane, Sea Lane and the churchtown.

At one time Lelant was an important town and seaport having a market and a custom-house. A parish terrier of 1727 describing the bounds of the glebe land states that about 50 acres of land, and the vicarage, were overwhelmed by sand. The terrier does not give a date but does say that it was not in the living memory of man. In the spring of 1875, during the building of the railway line between St Erth railway station and St Ives, several human skeletons, graves and a building were found by a gang of navvies. Observers of the building thought it was of an ecclesiastical nature, and it is possible that it is the site of a pre-Norman church, burial ground and the former Lelant town. Lelant was formerly an ecclesiastical parish being the mother church of both Towednack and St Ives. The parish church of St Uny's Church, Lelant is at the eastern end of the village on the edge of the towans and overlooking the West Cornwall Golf Club.

Lelant was a seaport in the Middle Ages, but the trade was lost to St Ives when the estuary silted up. In 1888 the Lelant Quays were offered for let from Lady Day (25 March). They had a water frontage of 574 feet (175 m) and there was a rail link to the St Ives branch line.

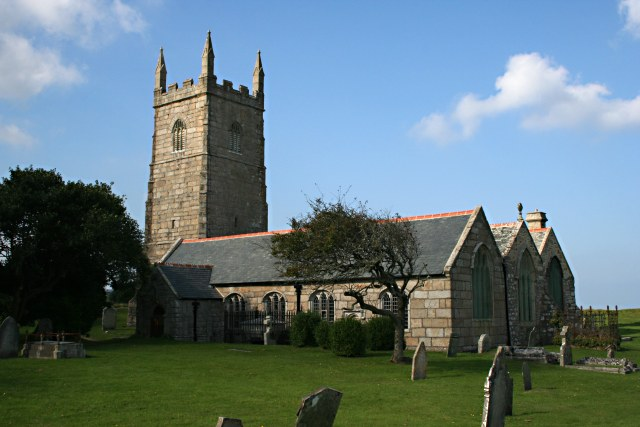
Lelant Church

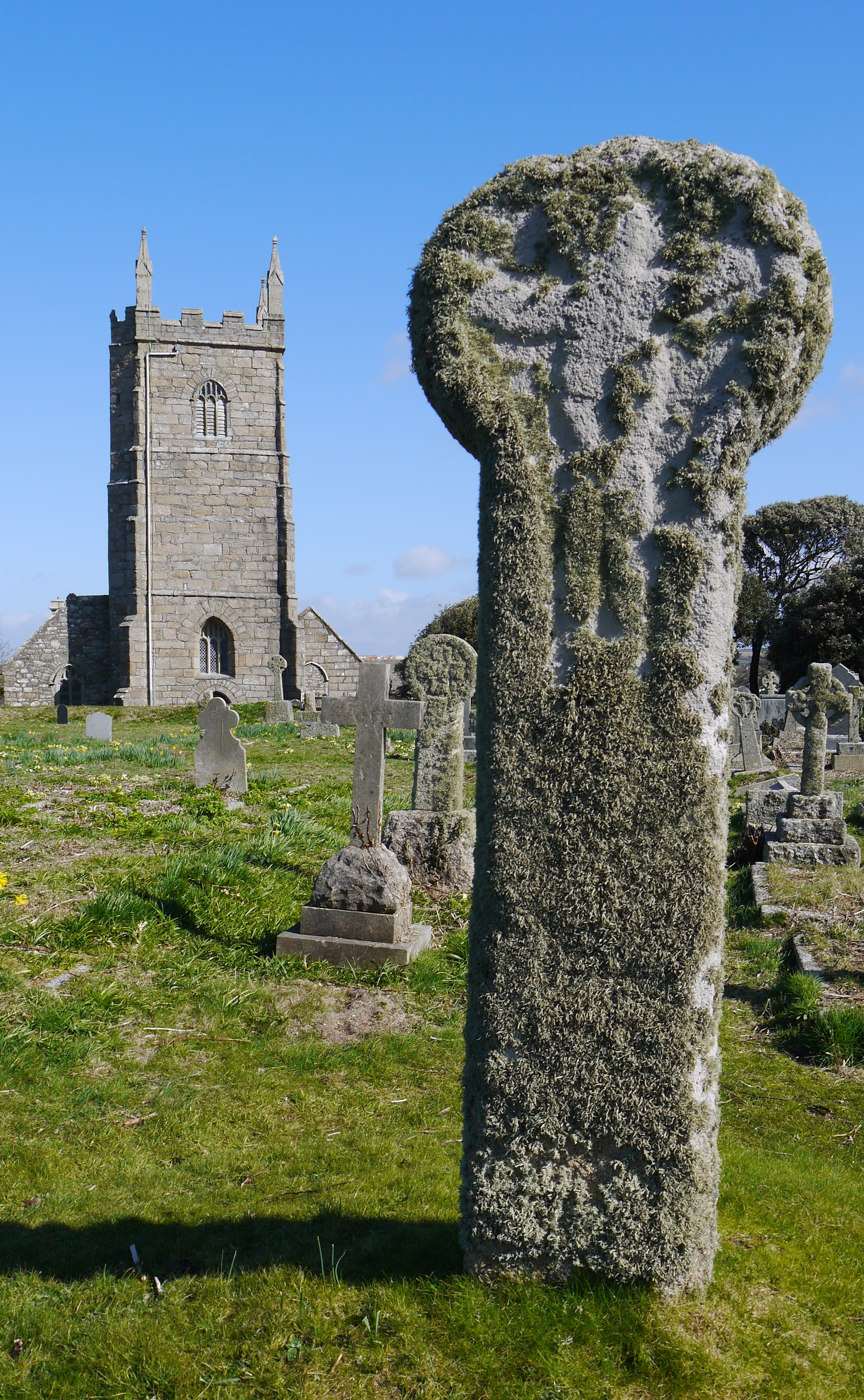
One of the crosses in the churchyard

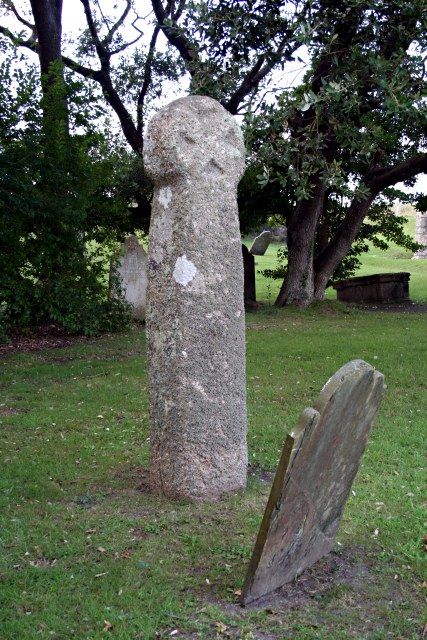
Another cross in the churchyard

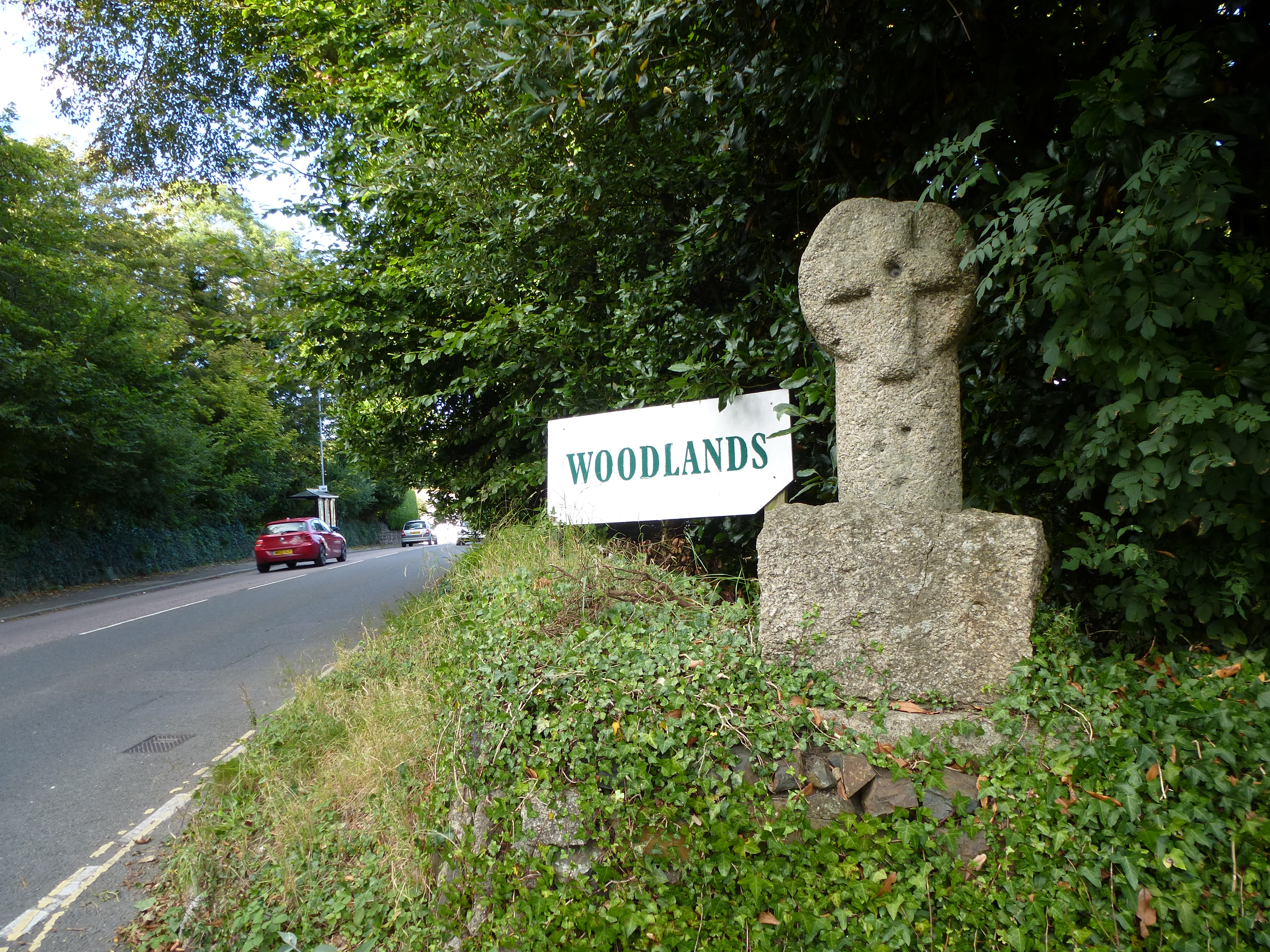
Woodlands cross

At Lower Lelant is a house called The Abbey which was built in the 16th century and renovated in the 18th. In 1831 it was reported that much granite was quarried here, and that there were several tin mines nearby. The family of Praed were landowners here for many centuries. The early 19th century politician and poet Winthrop Mackworth Praed was a member of the family, though he did not live in Cornwall.

On 15 October 1878, the School Board Office of Uny Lelant advertised for tenders for the building of a school to accommodate 234 children. The architect was Silvanus Trevail of Tywardreath. The school, at Trevarrack, 3 kilometres (1.9 mi) west of Lelant, is currently a public house.

The writer Virginia Woolf stayed at the Lelant Hotel during Christmas 1909.

The local community radio station is Coast FM (formerly Penwith Radio), which broadcasts on 96.5 and 97.2 FM.\

In 1931 the civil parish of Uny Lelant had a population of 1733. On 1 April 1934 the parish was abolished and merged with St Ives and Ludgvan.

== Transport ==
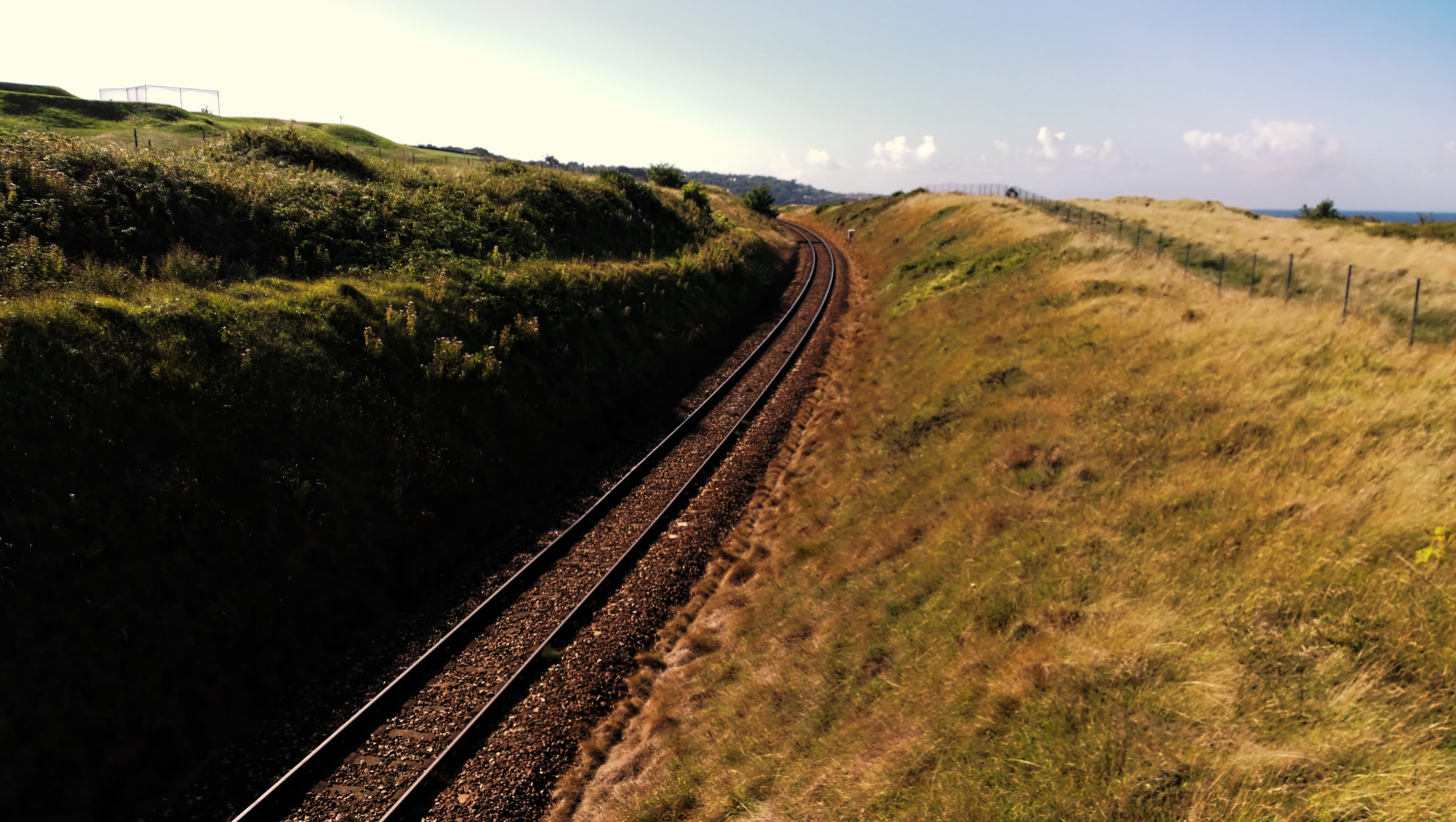
St. Ives Bay Line running above Porth Kidney Sands

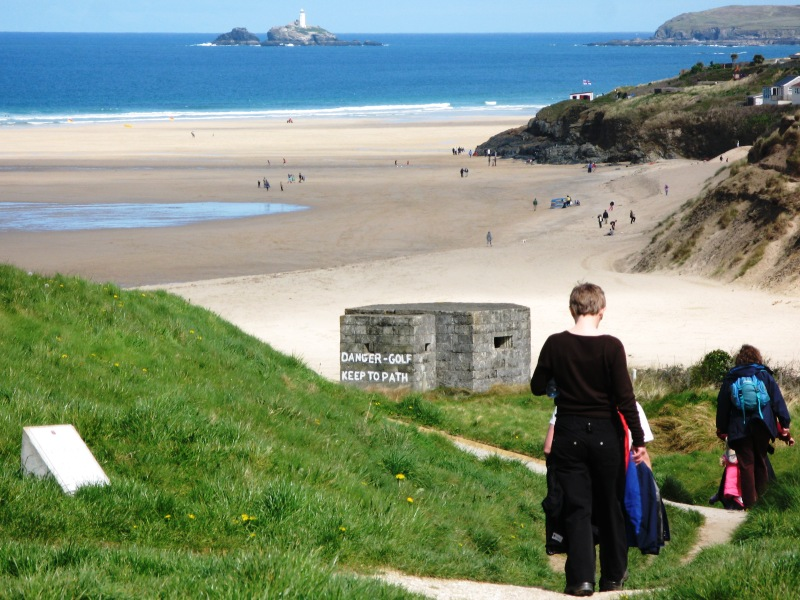
The South West Coast Path overlooking Porth Kidney in 2008 (the South West Coast Path passes through Lelant, along the estuary and above Porth Kidney Sands)

Lelant lies on the short A3074 road that leads to Carbis Bay and St Ives, just to the north of the main A30 after it bypasses Hayle and where it swings southwestwards across country towards Penzance on the south coast, about six miles away.

The village is served by two railway stations on the St Ives branch. The original station, Lelant, was built by the Great Western Railway in 1877 to serve Lelant village. Lelant Saltings was built in 1978 as a park and ride station to relieve traffic congestion in St Ives and Carbis Bay. However, in June 2019, the park and ride facilities closed.

The St Michael’s Way trail, established in 1994, starts at Lelant parish church and terminates 12.5 miles (20 km) later on the south coast at St Michael's Mount. The initial segment of this modern pilgrim route coincides with the South West Coast Path as far as the western end of Carbis Bay.

== Sport ==
The West Cornwall Golf Club is to the east of the village, on Lelant Towans, overlooks St Ives Bay and Godrevy Island. It is the oldest golf club in Cornwall and was formed in 1890. The new pavilion was opened in May 1890 and Joseph Lloyd was employed as the first professional.

St Ives Town play in the Cornwall Combination, a level 12 league in the English football league system. They play their home matches at the Saltings, which is between the village and Lelant Saltings railway station.

Cornish wrestling tournaments were held in a field opposite the Ship Inn in Lelant.

== Notable people ==
- Philip Christophers (1871–1946), member of the Legislative Assembly of Alberta, Canada
- Guy Thorne (1875–1923), English journalist and novelist; lived locally
- Jim Barnes (1886–1966), golfer; winner of the PGA Championship, the U.S. Open, and the British Open
- Rosamunde Pilcher (1924–2019), author of romance novels
