= Carbis Bay railway station =

Railway station in Cornwall, England

Carbis Bay
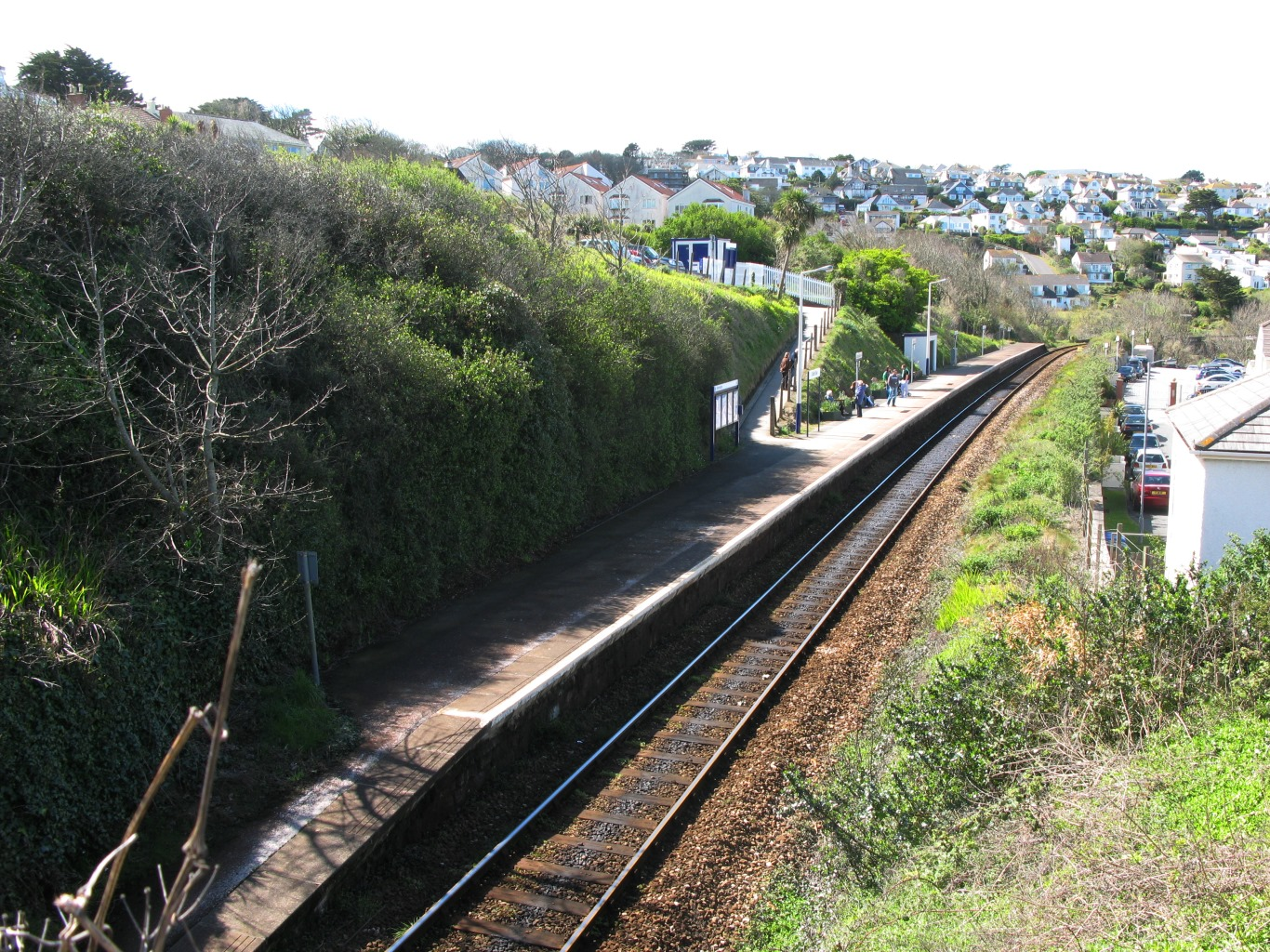

General information
- Location: Carbis Bay, Cornwall; England
- Coordinates: 50.197°N 5.464°W
- Grid reference: SW528387
- Manager: Great Western Railway
- Platforms: 1

Other information
- Station code: CBB
- Classification: DfT category F2

History
- Original company: Great Western Railway

Key dates
- Opened: 1877

Passengers
- 2021–2022: ▲0.230 million
- 2022–2023: ▼0.227 million
- 2023–2024: ▲0.257 million
- 2024–2025: ▲0.277 million
- 2025–2026: ▼0.275 million
Location

Carbis Bay railway station is on the St Ives Bay Line in Cornwall, England, United Kingdom and serves the village and beach of Carbis Bay, a community that only adopted this name after the arrival of the railway in 1877. Carbis Viaduct is situated on the St Ives (west) side of the station. It is the penultimate station on the line, between St Ives and Lelant, and is sited 323 miles 78 chains (521.4 km) from London Paddington, measured via St Erth, Plymouth Millbay and Box.

== History ==
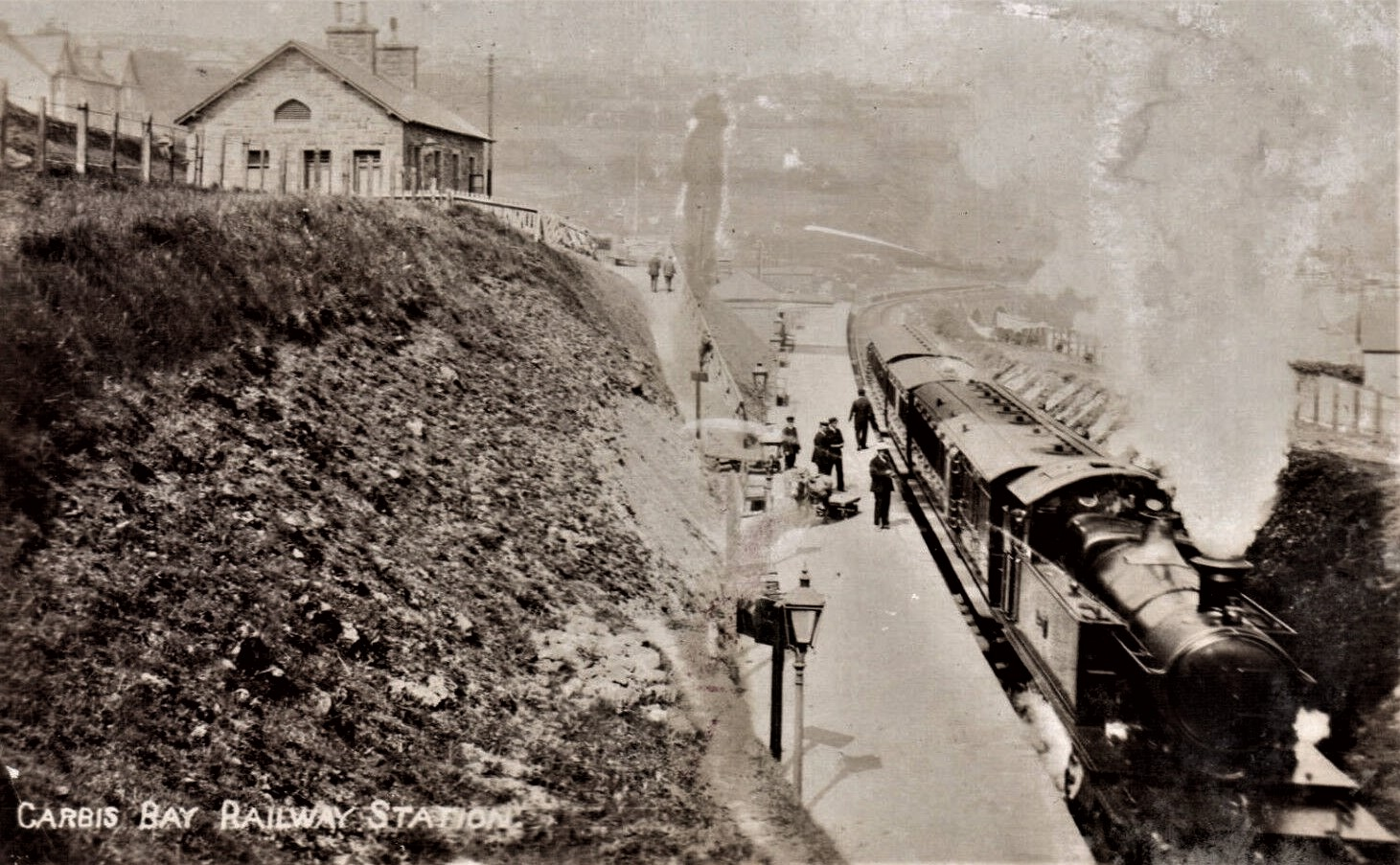
The station seen in 1911

The station was opened by the Great Western Railway on 1 June 1877 on their new branch line from St Erth to St Ives. The location of the station proved popular with visitors and the small farms around Wheal Providence mine expanded to become the village of Carbis Bay, named after the station. The station buildings were at the top of the shallow cutting in which the station is built. In 1899, the former station master Richard James was sentenced to 14 days in Bodmin prison for begging after he had got into difficulty through drink and being found begging for alms.

Goods traffic was withdrawn in May 1956.

In June 2021, Prime Minister Boris Johnson and Network Rail Chairman Peter Hendy unveiled a station sign, made of old railway sleepers, stones and seashells, as the 47th G7 summit took place in Carbis Bay.

== Carbis Viaduct ==
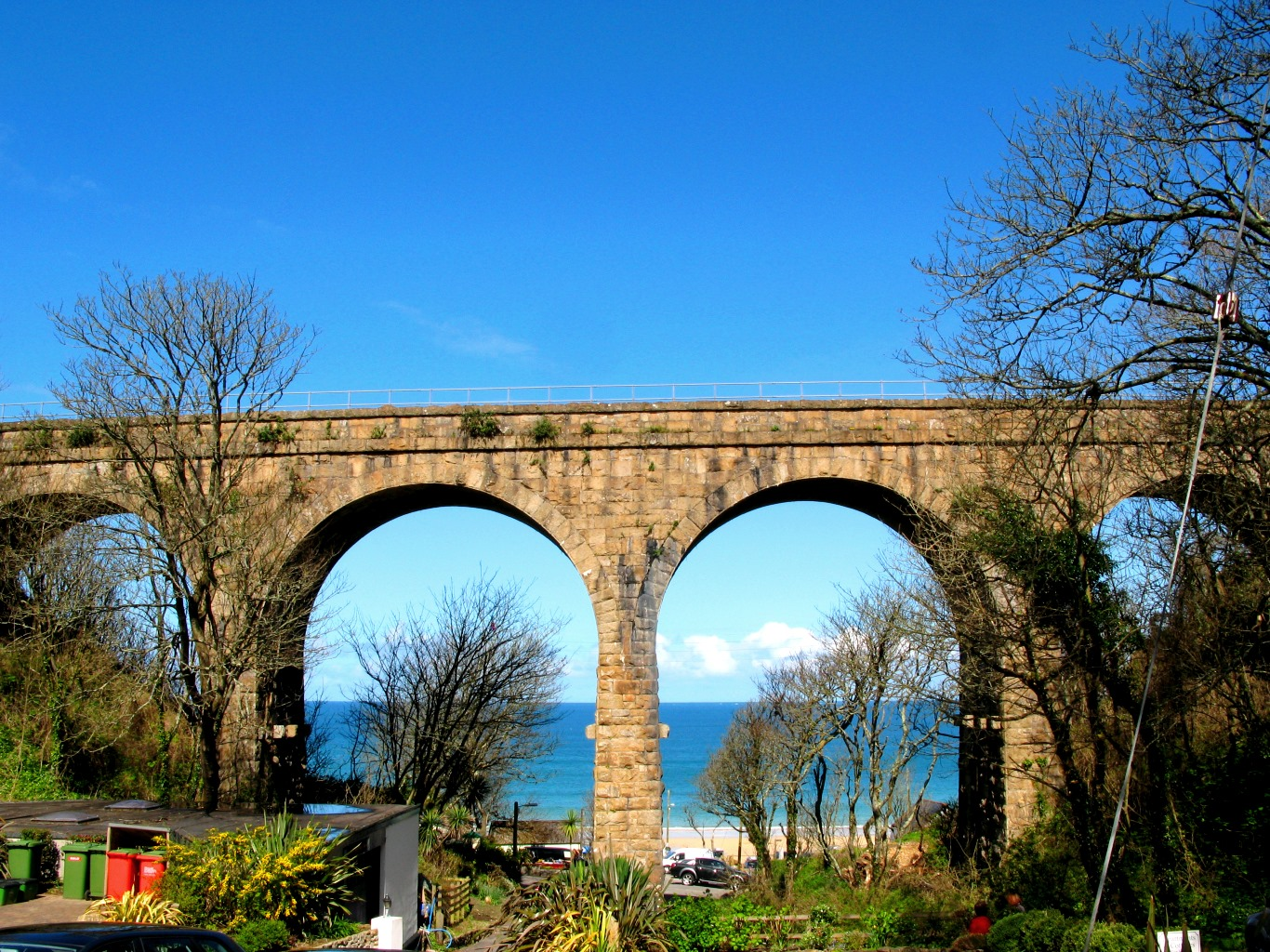
Carbis Viaduct looking north

Carbis Viaduct is a short distance beyond the station towards St Ives. It is built of granite from a nearby quarry at Towednack and has three piers supporting four 40 feet (12 m) arches, giving a total length of 78 yards (71 m); it is 78 feet (24 m) high.

== Facilities ==
There is a small car park at the station entrance but a larger one is available a short distance away. The station has cycle stands, benches and help points. As the station is unstaffed, and there are no facilities to purchase tickets, passengers must buy one in advance, or from the guard on the train.

== Passengers ==
Passengers starting and finishing journeys at Carbis Bay have been reported as more than 190,000 each year since 2011. In 2025–2026 they were estimated as 274,542.

Passengers by year
| Year (Note: The passenger volume data covers twelve month periods that start in April.) | Entries and exits |
|---|---|
| 1997–1998 | 44,784 |
| 1998–1999 | 40,364 |
| 1999–2000 | 38,410 |
| 2000–2001 | 42,717 |
| 2001–2002 | 48,616 |
| 2002–2003 | 60,620 |
| 2003–2004 | No data |
| 2004–2005 | 66,298 |
| 2005–2006 | 23,737 |
| 2006–2007 | 6,347 |
| 2007–2008 | 8,208 |
| 2008–2009 | 8,454 |
| 2009–2010 | 7,980 |
| 2010–2011 | 55,334 |
| 2011–2012 | 206,738 |
| 2012–2013 | 198,734 |
| 2013–2014 | 203,782 |
| 2014–2015 | 231,800 |
| 2015–2016 | 191,408 |
| 2016–2017 | 195,124 |
| 2017–2018 | 234,668 |
| 2018–2019 | 227,854 |
| 2019–2020 | 212,354 |
| 2020–2021 | 111,158 (Note: Passenger numbers were reduced during 2020 due to the COVID-19 pandemic in the United Kingdom.) |
| 2021–2022 | 230,256 |
| 2022–2023 | 226,768 |
| 2023–2024 | 256,874 |
| 2024–2025 | 276,938 |
| 2025–2026 | 274,542 |

== Services ==
All trains are operated by Great Western Railway. Most run between St Ives and St Erth half hourly, but first and last trains are extended from and to Penzance.

| Preceding station | National Rail | Following station |
|---|---|---|
| St Ives Terminus | Great Western Railway St Ives Bay Line | Lelant towards St Erth |

== Community rail ==
The station, along with the others on the line, is promoted by the Devon and Cornwall Rail Partnership.

== Notes ==
This station offers access to the South West Coast Path
| Distance to path | 50 yards (46 m) |
| Next station anticlockwise | St Ives 1 mile (2 km) |
| Next station clockwise | Lelant 2 miles (3 km) |
