= St Ives Bay Line =

Railway line in Cornwall, England

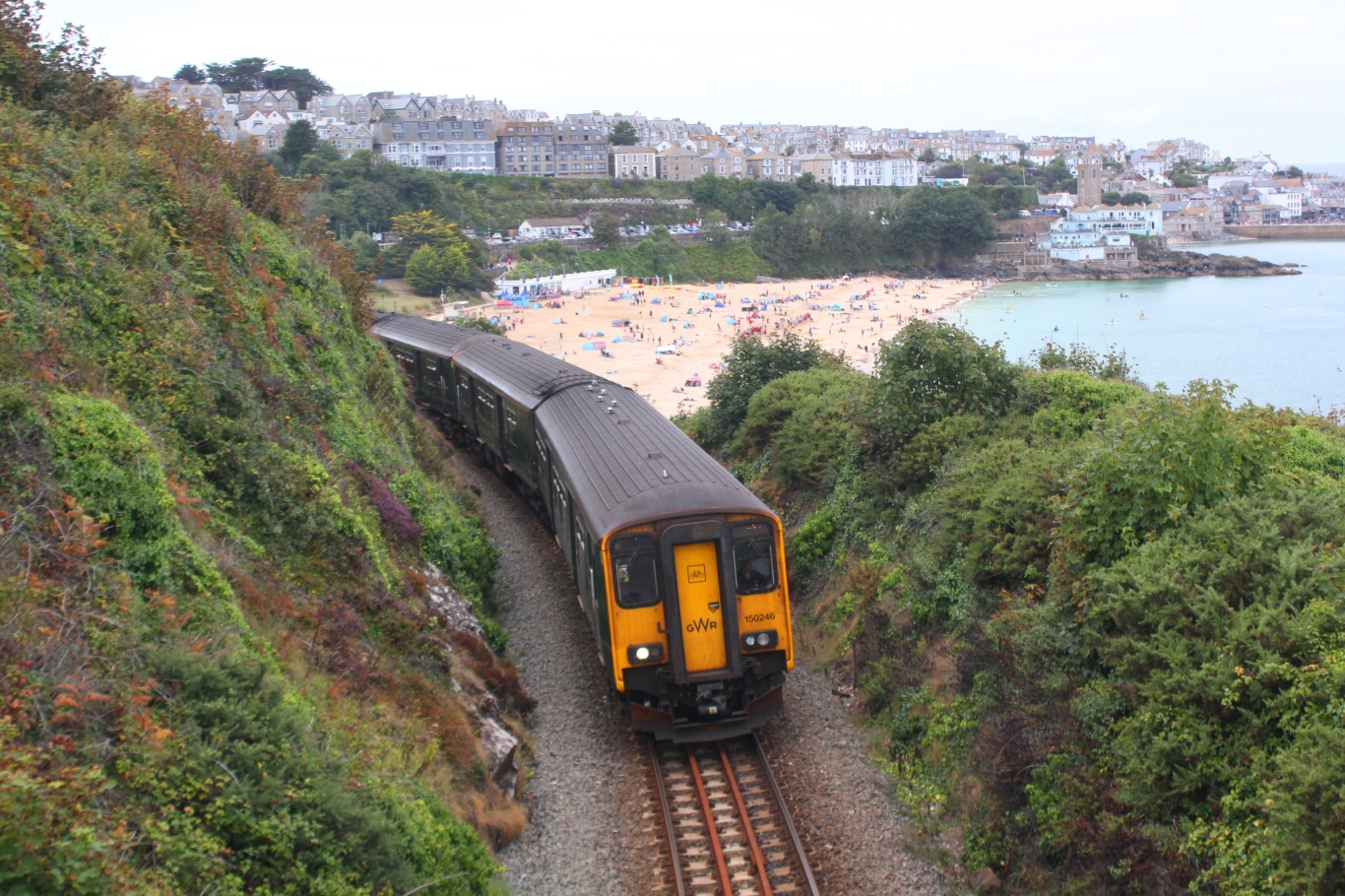

Overview
- Owner: Network Rail
- Locale: Cornwall
- Termini: St Erth 50.1706°N 5.4443°W; St Ives 50.2088°N 5.4777°W
- Stations: 5

Service
- Type: Community railway
- Operator: Great Western Railway
- Rolling stock: Class 150

History
- Opened: 1877

Technical
- Line length: 4.25 miles (6.84 km)
- Number of tracks: Single track throughout
- Character: Rural
- Track gauge: 4 ft 8 1/2 in (1,435 mm) standard gauge
- Old gauge: 7 ft (2,134 mm) until 20 May 1892
- Operating speed: 30 mph (48 km/h)
Route map
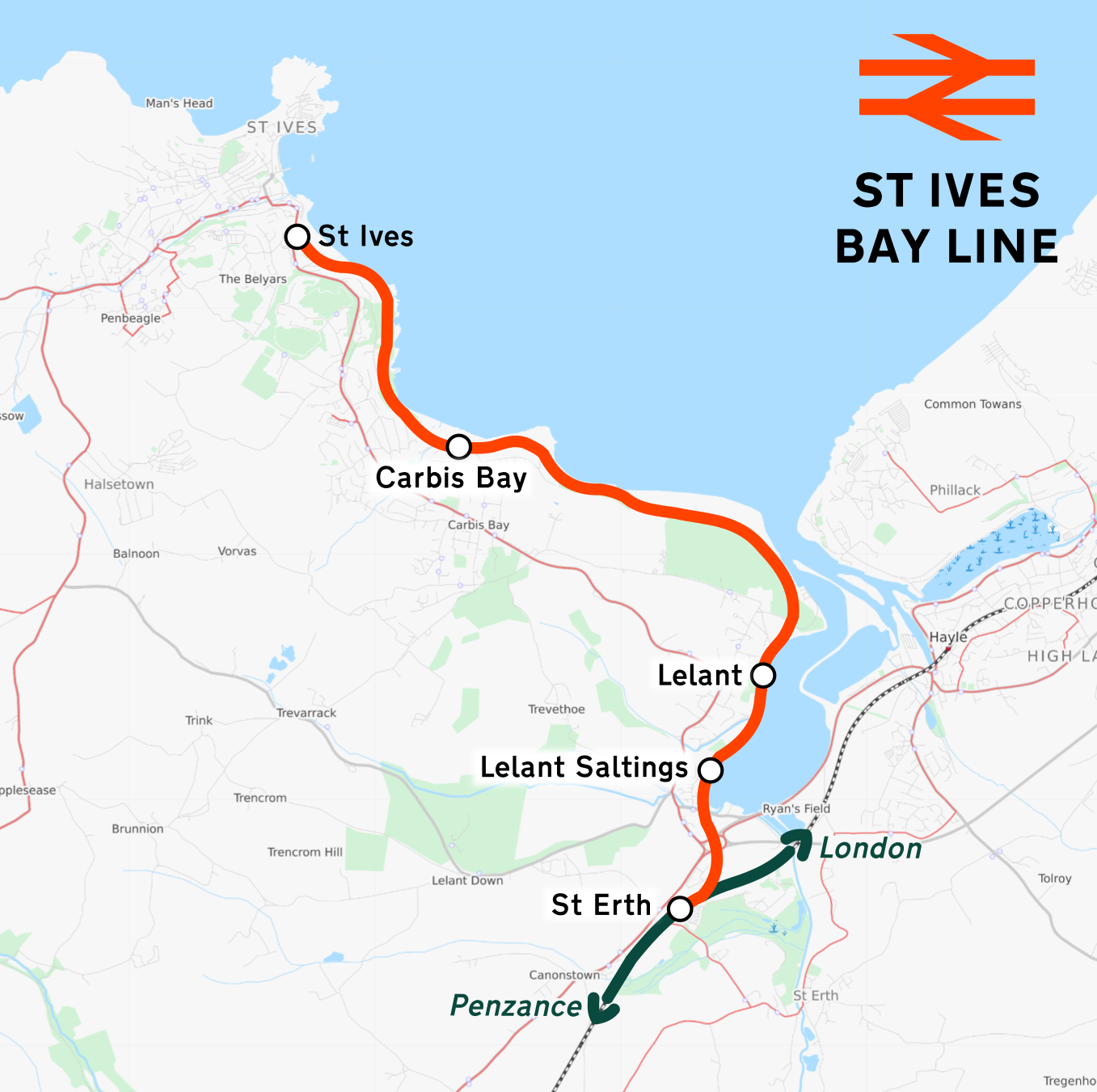

The St Ives Bay Line is a 4.25-mile (6.84 km) railway line from St Erth to St Ives in Cornwall, England, United Kingdom. It was opened in 1877, the last new 7 ft (2,134 mm) broad gauge passenger railway to be constructed in the country. Converted to standard gauge in 1892, it continues to operate as a community railway, carrying tourists as well as local passengers. It has five stations including the junction with the Cornish Main Line at St Erth.

== History ==
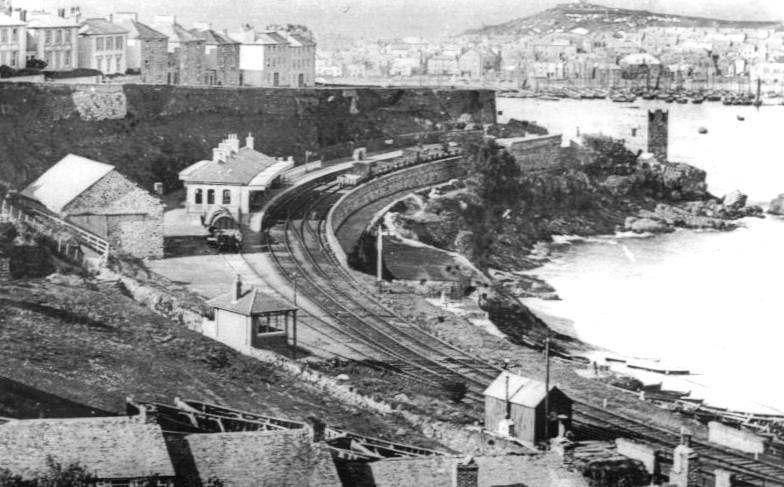
St Ives circa 1890

The St Ives Junction Railway applied for an act of Parliament in 1845, but as the West Cornwall Railway failed in its application for an act in that session of Parliament, the St Ives company withdrew its proposal. The Great Western, Bristol & Exeter, and South Devon Railway Companies Act 1873 was passed by Parliament to authorise a St Ives branch line as an extension of the West Cornwall Railway, although by that time this was controlled by the Great Western Railway. It was opened on 1 June 1877, the last new 7 ft (2,134 mm) broad gauge passenger railway route to be built in Britain. A third rail was added to the southern section of the line in October 1888 to allow 4 ft 8 1/2 in (1,435 mm) standard gauge goods trains to reach the wharf at Lelant. The last broad-gauge train ran on Friday 20 May 1892; since the following Monday all trains have been standard gauge.

Although there was heavy traffic in fish in the early years, this declined during the first half of the twentieth century. Goods traffic was withdrawn from the intermediate stations at Lelant and Carbis Bay in May 1956 but continued at St Ives until September 1963.

All the sidings were taken out of use at St Ives by 1966, when trains on the branch were operated by diesel multiple units. The line was proposed for closure in the Reshaping of British railways report which prompted it to be one of the lines featured in Flanders and Swann’s Slow Train, but Minister of Transport Barbara Castle reprieved it. On 23 May 1971, the platform at St Ives was moved to make way for a car park but seven years later, on 27 May 1978, a new station was opened at Lelant Saltings between St Erth and Lelant. This was given a large car park so that it could operate as a Park and Ride facility for St Ives. In June 2019, the Park and Ride facility was moved to St Erth and services at Lelant Saltings were reduced.

== Route ==
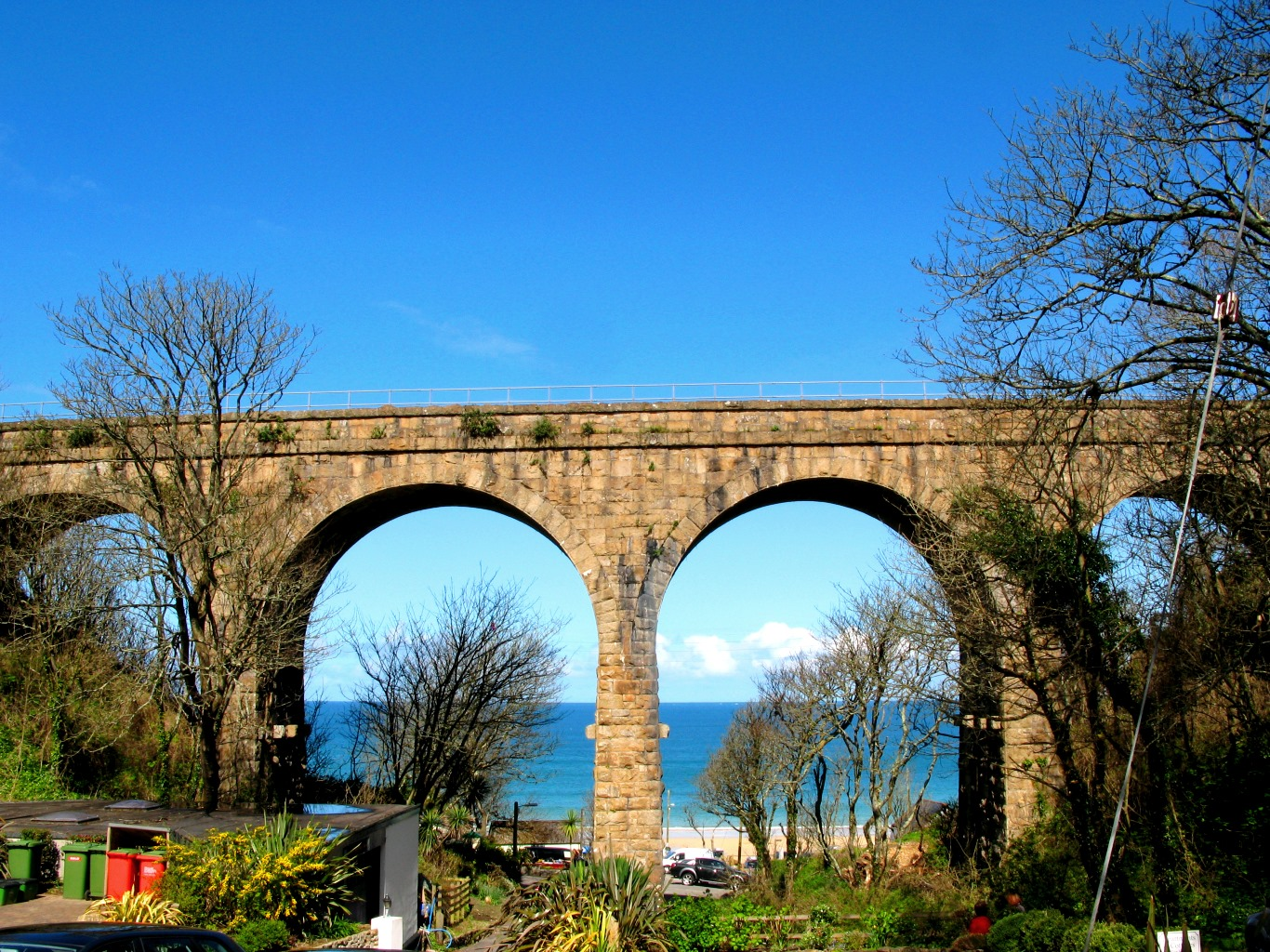
Carbis Bay Viaduct

The route serves St Erth, Lelant, Carbis Bay, and St Ives. The branch line is single track for its whole length with no passing places. It runs alongside the Hayle estuary and then the sea coast and is promoted as a good place to see birds from the train. It has also been listed as one of the most picturesque railways in England.

The line diverges from the Cornish Main Line at St Erth. After the line goes through a short cutting and underneath two road bridges which carry the A30 roundabout outside the station, the line follows the western side of the estuary past Lelant Saltings. Beyond Lelant railway station the line enters a cutting and climbs onto the sand dunes above Porth Kidney Sands on St Ives Bay, with the church of St Uny and Lelant golf course on the left; the church's cemetery was disturbed when the railway cut through the hill. The South West Coast Path crosses the line here and then follows close by all the way to St Ives. The railway continues to climb up and onto the steep cliffs at Hawkes Point, about 30 metres (98 ft) above sea level. Soon after the line comes around the headland at Carrick Gladden and into Carbis Bay. Perched on the hillside above the beach, this resort only developed after the railway arrived in 1877. The line now crosses 78 yards (71 m) long Carbis Viaduct then continues on the cliff's edge until it emerges at Porthminster Point, from where it drops down across the 106 yards (97 m) St Ives Viaduct to reach St Ives railway station which is situated above Portminster Beach.

== Services ==
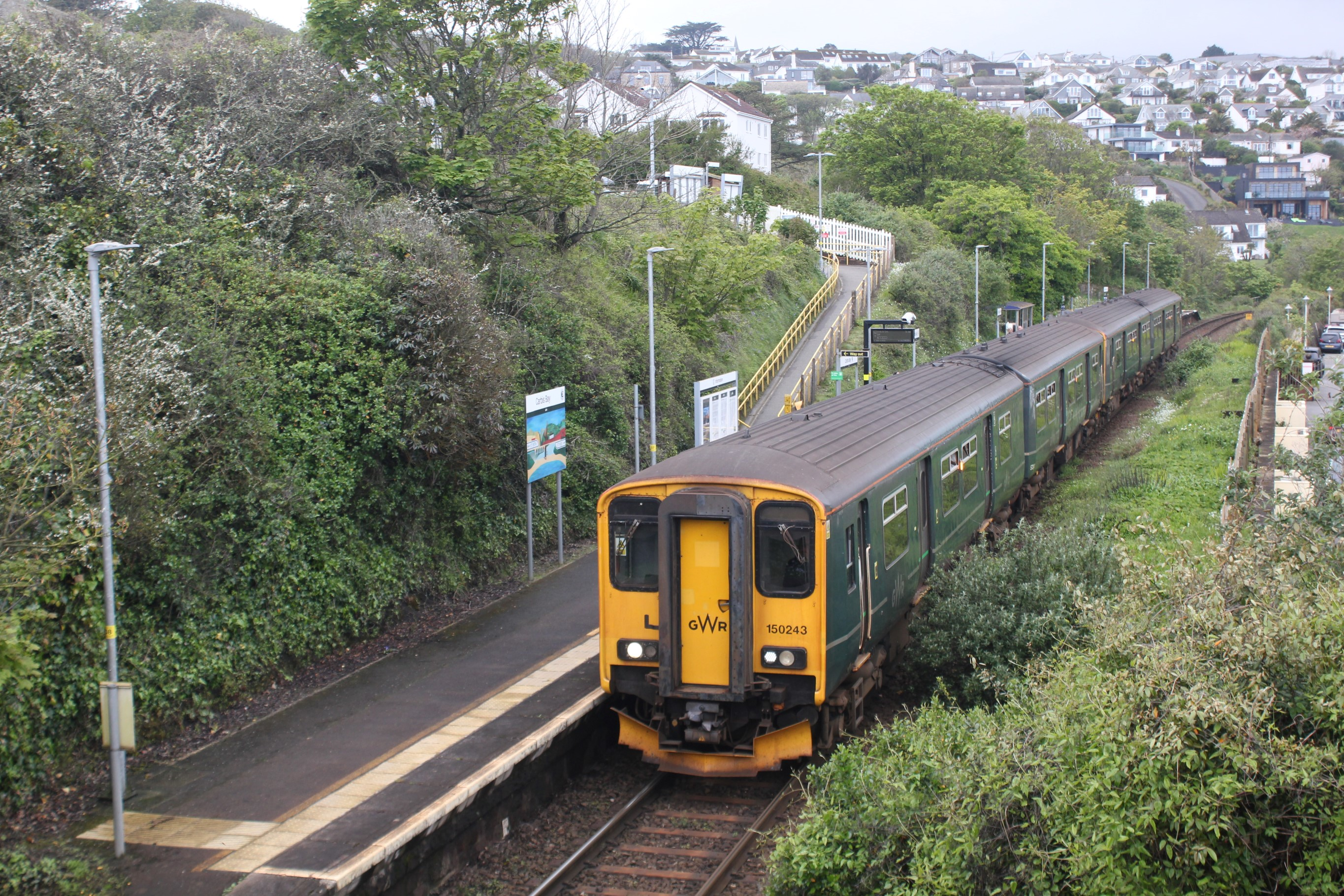
Great Western Railway service formed by two Class 150s at Carbis Bay

The line initially saw just five trains a day, but by 1909 this had grown to nine and in 1965 it was 17 with up to 24 on summer Saturdays. Some trains included through carriages from London Paddington station and in the 1950s the Cornish Riviera Express ran from St Ives through to Paddington on summer Saturdays. The number of services continued to increase following the opening of Lelant Saltings and the summer of 2006 saw 26 daily services operated by Wessex Trains. First Great Western (now Great Western Railway, GWR) took over the operation later in the year and the winter timetable was reduced to 16 trains which caused some concern.

In the winter of 2026, GWR operated 28 trains each way on weekdays, 26 on Saturdays and 19 on Sundays. The 2026 summer timetable had one additional train on Sundays. All trains call at Carbis Bay but Lelant is only served by about half the trains; Lelant Saltings has only one train each way each day.

== Signalling ==
The line is controlled from the signal box at St Erth; only one train is allowed to operate on the line at any time. Trains travelling towards St Ives are described as 'down trains' and those towards St Erth as 'up trains'. There are three public crossings on the line. 'Western Growers Crossing' is a crossing at St Erth which the signaller can see from the signal box. 'Towan Crossing' is a user-worked crossing north of Lelant, and there is a foot crossing at Hawke's Point as the line approaches Carbis Bay.

== Community rail ==
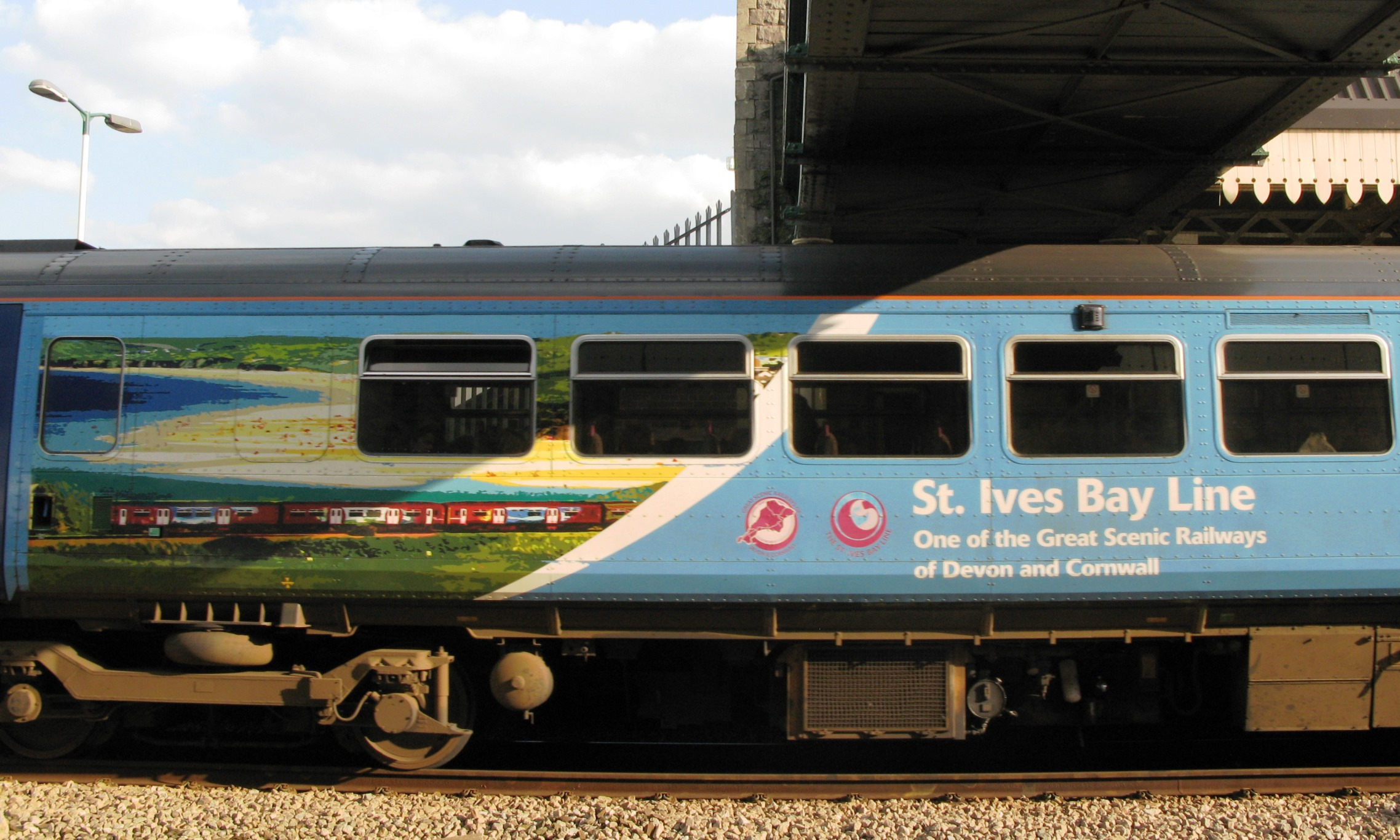
The special livery once carried by DMU 153329

The St Ives Bay Line is one of the railway lines supported by the Devon and Cornwall Rail Partnership (DCRP), an organisation formed in 1991 to promote railway services in the area. The line is promoted by many means such as regular timetable and scenic line guides, as well as leaflets highlighting leisure opportunities such as walking, birdwatching, and visiting country pubs.

The branch was designated as a community railway line in July 2005, being one of seven pilots for the Department for Transport's Community Rail Development Strategy. This aimed to increase the number of passengers and reduce costs to make lightly used railways more economically sustainable. Among the DCRP's aims are a higher-frequency of service, to introduce local tickets and ticket vending machines, and public art on the stations promoting the line as the artistic gateway to St Ives.

Wessex Trains gave their Class 153 train 153329 the name St Ives Bay Line and a blue livery with large coloured pictures promoting the line. This was done in September 2005 but Wessex Trains lost the franchise for the local lines the following year.

== Passenger volume ==
From 2001 to 2011 journeys on the St Ives Bay Line increased by 68%.

Station usage
Station name	2002–03	2004–05	2005–06	2006–07	2007–08	2008–09	2009–10	2010–11	2011–12	2012–13	2013–14	2014–15	2015–16	2016–17	2017–18	2018–19	2019–20	2020–21	2021–22	2022–23	2023–24	2024–25
Lelant Saltings	17,001	18,281	23,774	653	251	554	622	17,224	101,284	107,780	114,932	116,798	125,064	121,258	145,110	138,012	84,522	392	568	652		
Lelant	6,913	8,697	1,653	250	240	592	324	1,842	2,910	2,322	2,494	2,874	8,104	8,322	9,618	10,632	21,608	16,600	29,788	25,160		
Carbis Bay	60,620	66,298	23,737	6,347	8,208	9,476	7,980	55,334	206,736	198,734	203,782	231,800	191,408	195,124	234,668	227,854	212,354	111,158	230,256	226,768		
St Ives	213,397	220,300	171,281	117,131	139,455	173,722	154,502	258,530	578,214	585,308	595,326	638,754	657,750	659,066	752,654	750,478	706,826	293,880	733,970	720,062		
The annual passenger usage is based on sales of tickets in stated financial years from Office of Rail and Road estimates of station usage. The statistics are for passengers arriving and departing from each station and cover twelve-month periods that start in April. Methodology may vary year on year. Usage since the period 2019–20 have been affected by the COVID-19 pandemic, especially the period 2020–23.
