= Lelant Saltings railway station =

Railway station in Cornwall, England

Lelant Saltings
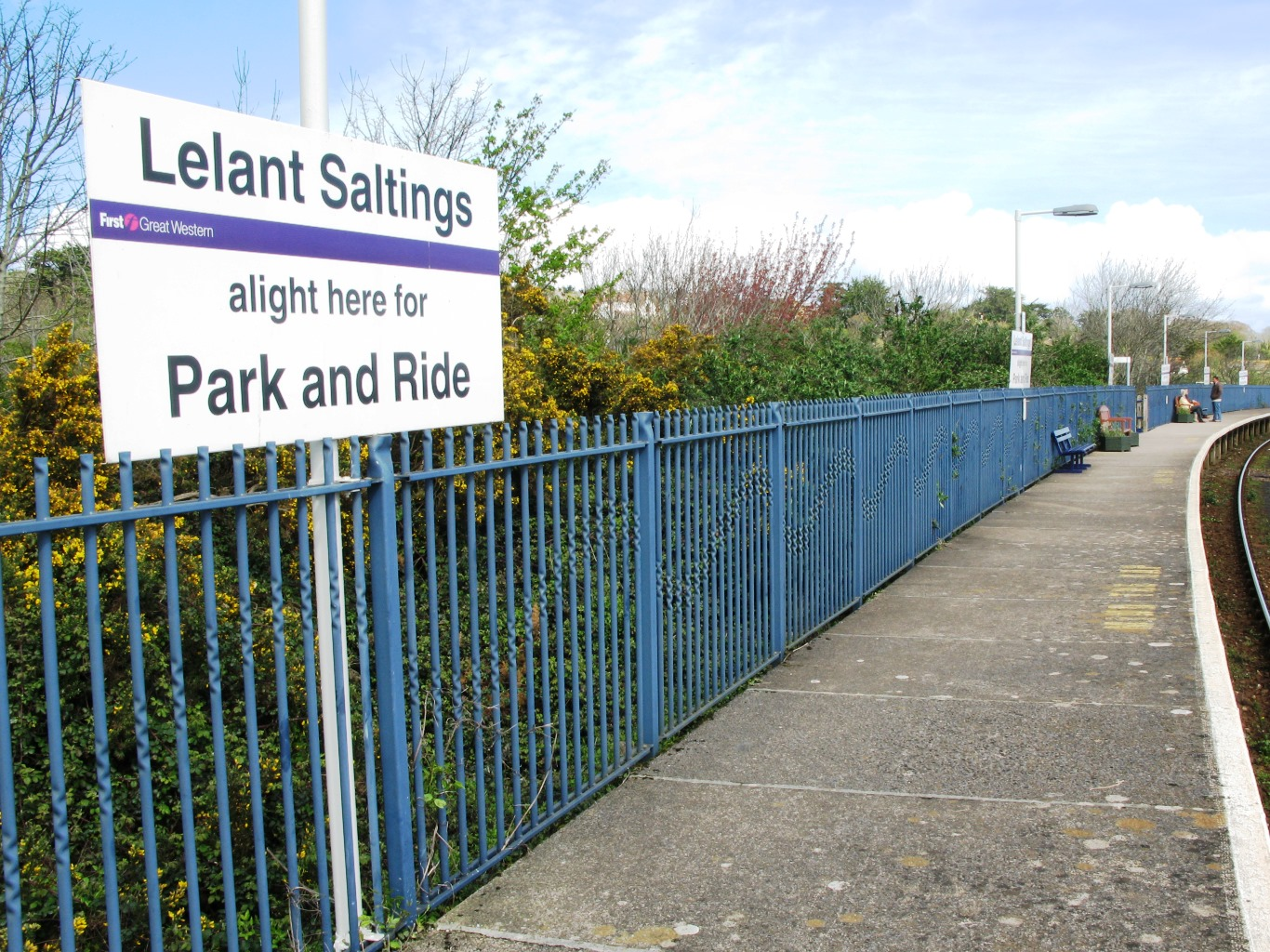
- Looking north

General information
- Location: Lelant, Cornwall; England
- Coordinates: 50.178°N 5.442°W
- Grid reference: SW543366
- Manager: Great Western Railway
- Platforms: 1

Other information
- Station code: LTS
- Classification: DfT category F2

History
- Original company: British Rail

Key dates
- Opened: 1978

Passengers
- 2021/22: ▲568
- 2022/23: ▲652
- 2023/24: ▼630
- 2024/25: ▲650
- 2025/26: ▲860
Location
Notes
- Passenger statistics from the Office of Rail and Road

Lelant Saltings railway station opened on 27 May 1978 to provide a park and ride facility for visitors to St Ives, Cornwall, England. It is situated on the A3074 road close to the junction with the A30 near the foot of the hill up to Lelant village. The park and ride facility closed in June 2019, replaced by a new one at nearby St Erth railway station, but the Saltings station remains open with a very limited service of trains.

== History ==
A park and ride station for St Ives was initially announced in January 1977 with a cost of £174,000; £116,000 of this planned amount was for signalling equipment. A site at St Erth was proposed but deemed unsuitable since drivers coming from Hayle and the east would have to pass the St Ives junction to get to the station and since the railway bridge at St Erth was too narrow for pedestrians to use safely. Initial plans also proposed a passing loop at Porthkidney to allow for three services an hour rather than two; even at that stage, the loop was labelled "not essential" and that "British Rail would be saved a lot of money" if it were not implemented.

The station was opened by British Rail on 27 May 1978 and had a car park for 300 vehicles. A return ticket to St Ives cost £0.60. Cornwall County Council provided £35,000 to build the car park and Penwith District Council paid £15,000 to build the platform. During the first summer nearly 136,000 people travelled on the line, with 3,000 cars using the car park in peak weeks. Nearly 40% of users surveyed said that they would not have visited St Ives if the park and ride was not available.

Following the success of the scheme the previous summer, the platform at the station (as well as at St Ives) was lengthened in 1979 to provide longer trains.

The park and ride closed in June 2019 when a new facility opened at St Erth Station.

== Description ==
The station is 0.5 miles (800 m) north of St Erth and faces the Hayle Estuary. There is just a single platform built from pre-cast concrete components, which is on the left of trains arriving from St Erth.

St Ives Town F.C. play their football matches on a pitch at The Saltings next to the station.

== Services ==
All trains are operated by Great Western Railway. Until May 2019, the station was served by two trains per hour between St Erth and St Ives.

Since May 2019 the station is served by a 'Parliamentary service' of just one train per day in each direction (calling at 07:56 towards St Ives and at 09:30 towards St Erth). The reduction in service was due to the relocation of the Park and Ride facility to St Erth. As a result of the reduction in services, Lelant, which previously had a very limited service, is now served more frequently. 100% of trains from Lelant Saltings in 2024 arrived on time, one of five stations with this record.

Preceding station	National Rail	Following station
St Erth Terminus	Great Western Railway St Ives Bay Line	Lelant towards St Ives

This station offers access to the South West Coast Path
Distance to path	150 yards (140 m)
Next station anticlockwise	Lelant 0.75 miles (1 km)
Next station clockwise	Hayle 2 miles (3 km)
