= Lelant railway station =

Railway station in Cornwall, England

Lelant
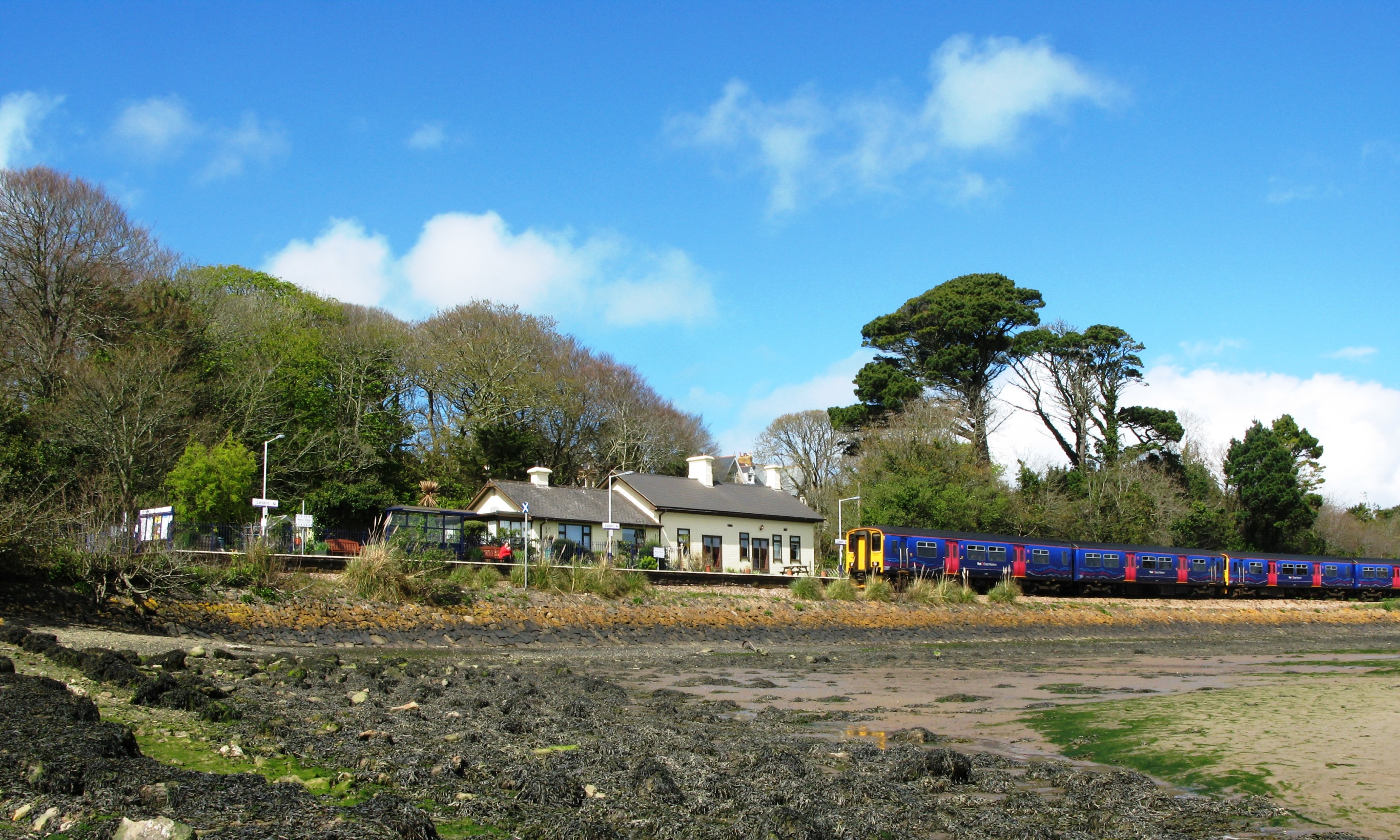

General information
- Location: Lelant, Cornwall; England
- Coordinates: 50.184°N 5.437°W
- Grid reference: SW547372
- Manager: Great Western Railway
- Platforms: 1

Other information
- Station code: LEL
- Classification: DfT category F2

History
- Original company: Great Western Railway

Key dates
- Opened: 1877

Passengers
- 2021–2022: ▲29,788
- 2022–2023: ▼25,160
- 2023–2024: ▲27,722
- 2024–2025: ▲31,072
- 2025–2026: ▲33,312
Location

Lelant railway station is on the waterfront of the Hayle estuary below the village of Lelant in Cornwall, United Kingdom. It is 322 miles 6 chains (518.3 km) from London Paddington, measured via St Erth and Box, on the St Ives Bay Line between Lelant Saltings and Carbis Bay.

== History ==
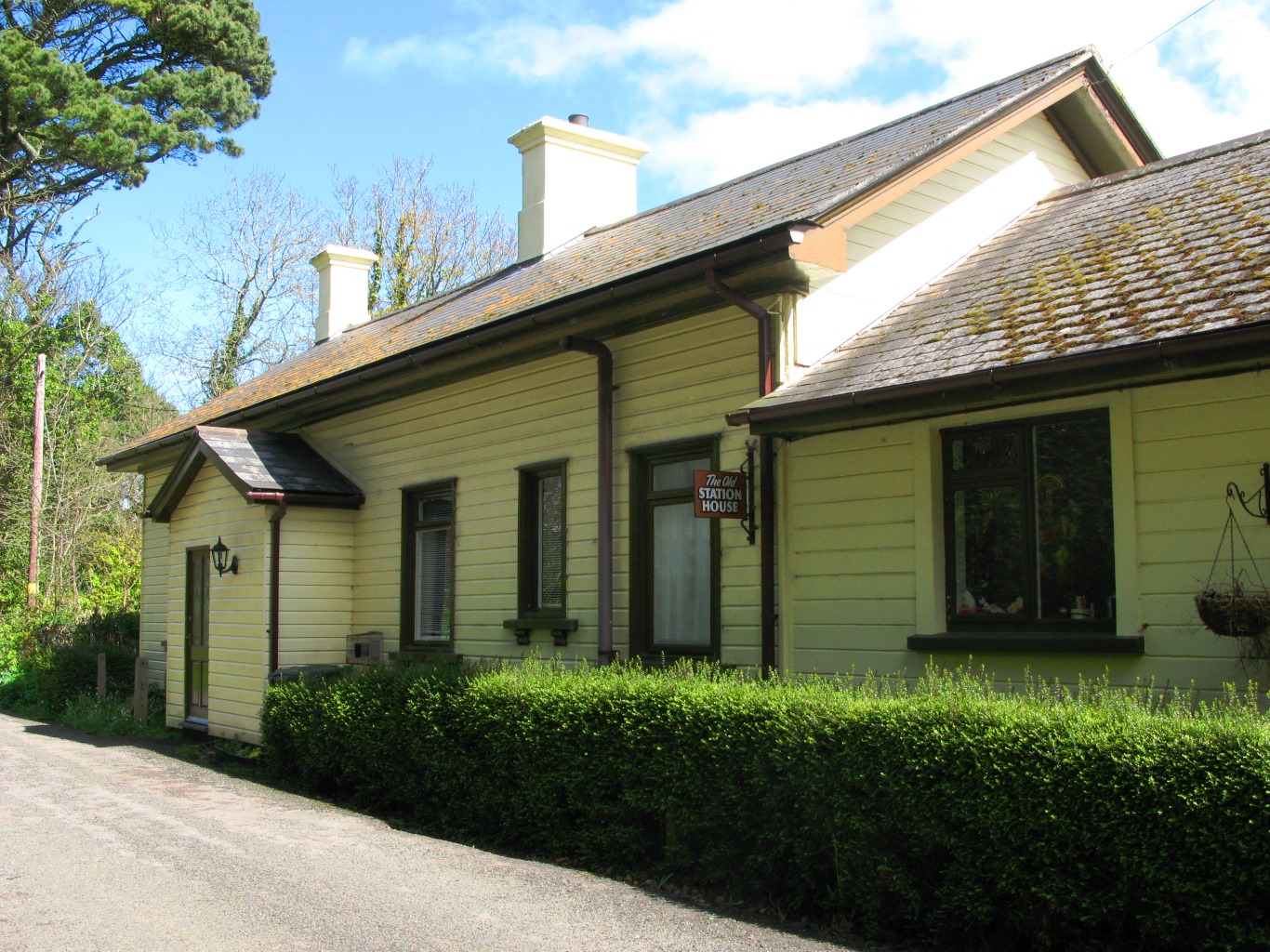
The old station building

The station was opened by the Great Western Railway on 1 June 1877 on their new branch line from St Erth to St Ives (although the branch opened for goods trains carrying fish on the 28 May). No goods sidings were ever provided at the station, but a line was laid from the station out to sidings on Lelant Wharf where traffic could be transferred between railway wagons and boats. The St Ives branch was laid using 7 ft (2,134 mm) broad gauge, but in 1888 a third rail was added to the line from St Erth to allow 4 ft 8 1/2 in (1,435 mm) standard gauge goods trains to reach the wharf.

The last broad gauge train ran on Friday 20 May 1892; since the following Monday all trains have been standard gauge.

The station was briefly closed in 1955, between 4 April and 14 May. Goods traffic was withdrawn in May 1956 and the station is now unstaffed. The station, along with the rest of the St Ives line, was earmarked for closure under the Beeching cuts, but was saved after intervention by then-Minister for Transport, Barbara Castle. The village is at the top of the road that climbs the hill opposite the station entrance. The Old Station house served cream teas up until summer 2012.

In 2022, the platform was extended by 13 metres (43 feet) to allow it to accommodate trains with five carriages.

== Description ==
The station is 1 mile (1.6 km) north of St Erth and faces the Hayle Estuary. There is just a single platform, which is on the left of trains arriving from St Erth.

Limited car parking is available, adjacent to the platform. The village is at the top of the road that climbs the hill opposite the station entrance.

== Passengers ==
Passengers starting or finishing journeys at Lelant were estimated in the low hundreds in the early 2000s but have increased steadily along with the other stations on the line. In 2024–2025 they were estimated to exceed 30,000 for the first time.

Passengers by year
Year (Note: The passenger data covers twelve month periods that start in April.)	Entries and exits
1997–1998	4,801
1998–1999	4,864
1999–2000	4,823
2000–2001	5,191
2001–2002	6,417
2002–2003	6,913
2003–2004	No data
2004–2005	8,697
2005–2006	1,653
2006–2007	250
2007–2008	240
2008–2009	560
2009–2010	324
2010–2011	1,842
2011–2012	2,908
2012–2013	2,322
2013–2014	2,494
2014–2015	2,874
2015–2016	8,104
2016–2017	8,322
2017–2018	9,618
2018–2019	10,632
2019–2020	21,608
2020–2021	16,600 (Note: Passenger numbers were reduced during 2020 due to the COVID-19 pandemic in the United Kingdom.)
2021–2022	29,788
2022–2023	25,160
2023–2024	27,722
2024–2025	31,072
2025–2026	33,312

== Services ==
The station has an irregular service of up to 13 trains per day in each direction. These call only on request which means passengers wanting to join the train need to signal to the driver, and those who wish to alight need to inform the conductor.

Preceding station	National Rail	Following station
Carbis Bay towards St Ives	Great Western Railway St Ives Bay Line	Lelant Saltings towards St Erth

== Cultural references ==
In the book, "Tiny Stations", Lelant is the first station Dixe Wills visits on his tour of UK request stops.

== Notes ==
This station offers access to the South West Coast Path
Distance to path	0.25 miles (0.40 km)
Next station anticlockwise	Carbis Bay 1 mile (1.6 km)
Next station clockwise	Lelant Saltings 0.25 miles (0.40 km)
