= St Ives railway station =

Railway station in Cornwall, England

St Ives
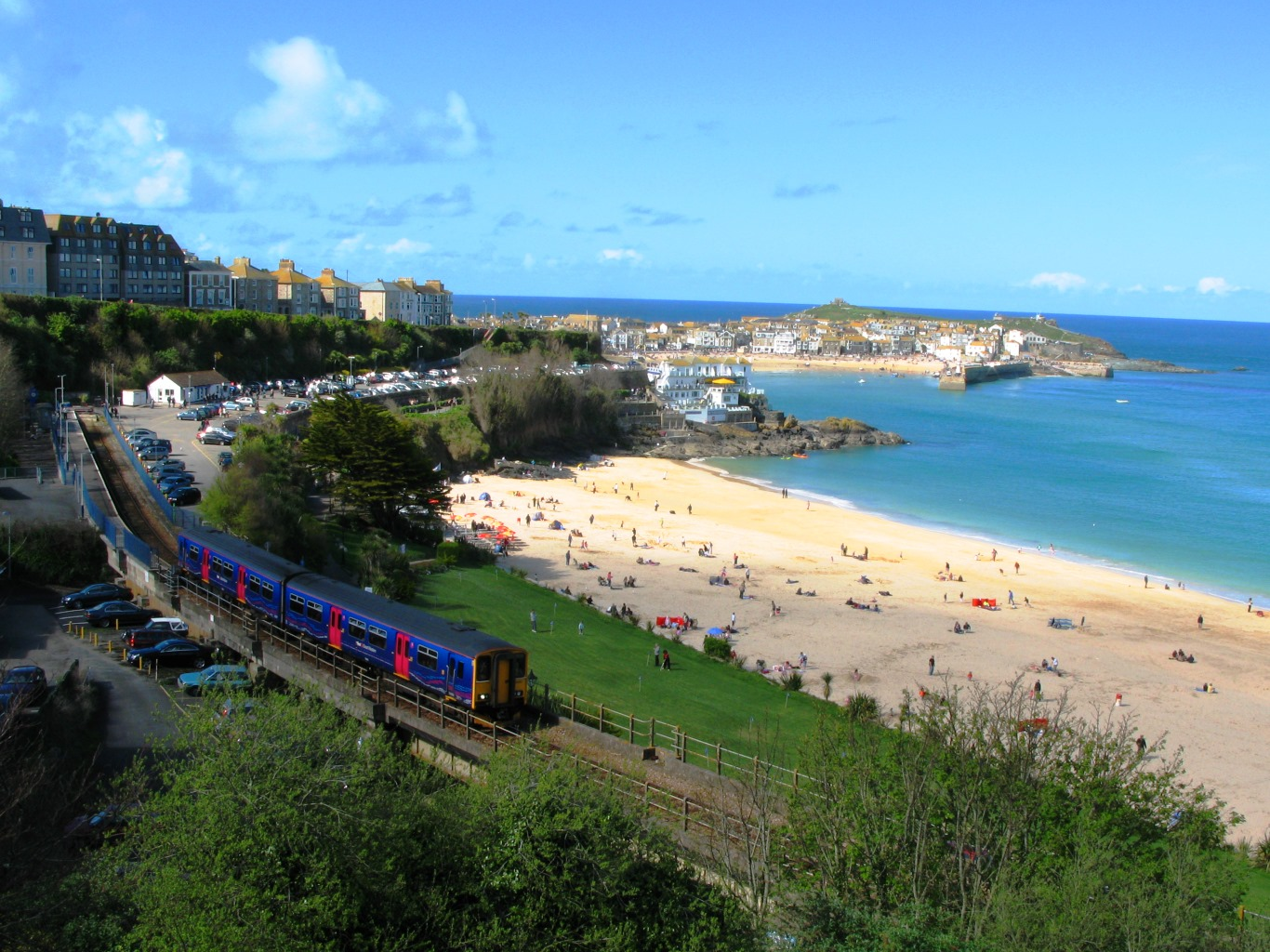

General information
- Location: St Ives, Cornwall; England
- Coordinates: 50.209°N 5.478°W
- Grid reference: SW519401
- Manager: Great Western Railway
- Platforms: 1

Other information
- Station code: SIV
- Classification: DfT category F1

History
- Original company: Great Western Railway

Key dates
- Opened: 1877
- Resited: 1971

Passengers
- 2020/21: ▼0.294 million
- 2021/22: ▲0.734 million
- 2022/23: ▼0.720 million
- 2023/24: ▲0.775 million
- 2024/25: ▲0.851 million
Location
Notes
- Passenger statistics from the Office of Rail and Road

St Ives railway station is a railway station which serves the coastal town of St Ives, Cornwall, England. It was opened in 1877 as the terminus of the last new broad gauge passenger railway to be constructed in the country. Converted to standard gauge in 1892, it is today served by Great Western Railway services on the St Ives Bay Line from St Erth.

== History ==
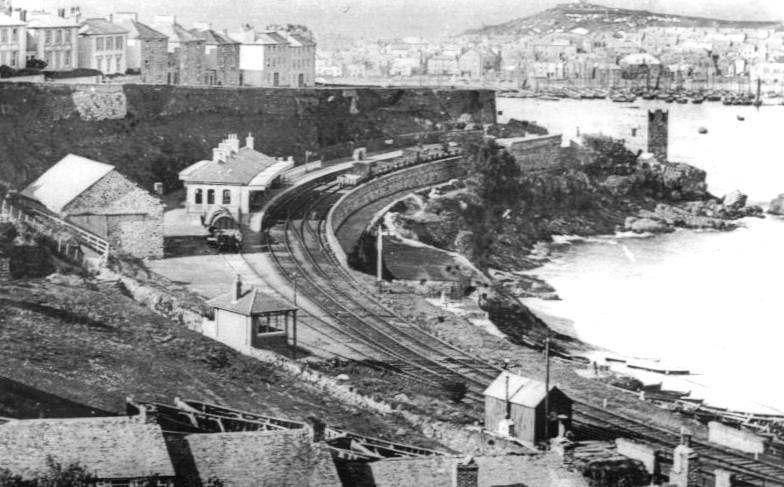
The station in broad gauge days

The station was opened by the Great Western Railway on 1 June 1877 as the terminus of a 4 1/4-mile (6.8 km) long, 7 ft (2,134 mm) gauge branch line from St Erth which until then had been known as St Ives Road to indicate its position as the railhead for the town. The platform was on a sharp curve with a goods shed behind it. The town end of the platform was used to load railway trucks with fish that were caught by the many local boats, many of which were drawn up on Porthminster beach, just below the station. Immediately outside the station was the 106-yard (97 m) long St Ives Viaduct. A small engine shed was situated on the far side of the viaduct. The arrival of the railways, while important for goods, propelled St Ives to become a tourist destination in its own right. (Note: The West Briton of 1873 said that the line would "largely benefit the inhabitants of St Ives, not only by enabling them to convey their fish without delay, but by causing a large number of houses to be built for the accommodation of the summer visitors")

The Great Western Railway purchased the Tregenna Castle, on the hill above the station, and opened it as a hotel to coincide with the opening of the railway. The railway has played an important part in developing the tourist business in the area.

The line was converted from broad gauge after the last train ran on Friday 20 May 1892; services from the following Monday running as 4 ft 8 1/2 in (1,435 mm) standard gauge. On 12 November 1894 heavy rain caused flood water to run down Tregenna Hill. It broke through a wall, flooding down onto the station below, from where it cascaded off the other side down on to the beach. The heavy fish traffic of the 19th century largely disappeared during the first half of the 20th century and all goods traffic was withdrawn from the station on 9 September 1963. The signal box was no longer staffed and all the sidings were taken out of use by 1966. A camping coach was positioned here by the Western Region in 1958 and 1959; then there were two coaches from 1960 to 1964.

The line was proposed for closure following the Beeching Report and, because of this, was mentioned in the song "Slow Train" by Flanders and Swann. The line however was reprieved, but the original curved station was closed on 23 May 1971 and a new, straight, platform opened on the site of the goods shed to replace it. The site of the original station is now a car park, but the railway also brings people from the Park and Ride car park at St Erth.

== Facilities ==
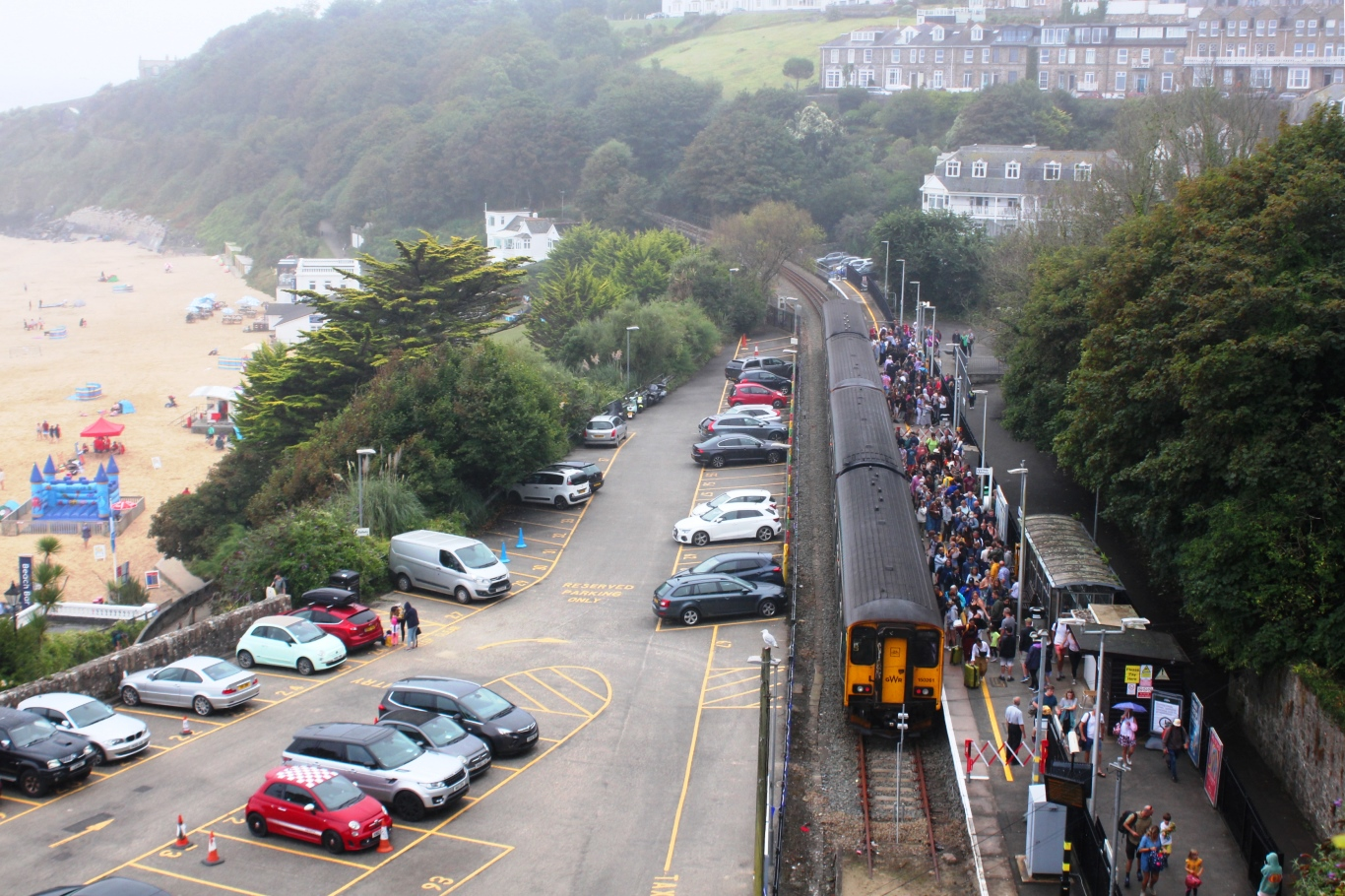
A view of St. Ives station

There is a large car park adjacent to the platform, and the town centre is a short walk down the hill from the car park entrance. The town's small bus station is situated at the car park entrance. A travel agency immediately adjacent to the station platform contains a rail ticket booking office. Tickets issued to/from the station describe it as "St Ives Cornwall". A path leads from the car park down to Porthminster beach, from where the South West Coast Path can be followed back to Carbis Bay or through the town towards Lands End.

== Services ==
All trains are operated by Great Western Railway. All services operate to and from St Erth, and connect with trains on the Cornish Main Line. During the daytime there are two services each hour. Only one of these typically calls at Lelant, with some gaps. The first and last train of the day (plus an early evening service on Saturday) are extended to Penzance to facilitate crew changes.

Preceding station	National Rail	Following station
Terminus	Great Western Railway St Ives Bay Line	Carbis Bay towards St Erth

== Notes ==
This station offers access to the South West Coast Path
Distance to path	100 yards (91 m)
Next station anticlockwise	Penzance 41 miles (66 km)
Next station clockwise	Carbis Bay 1 mile (2 km)
