= St Uny's Church, Lelant =

St Uny Church, Lelant
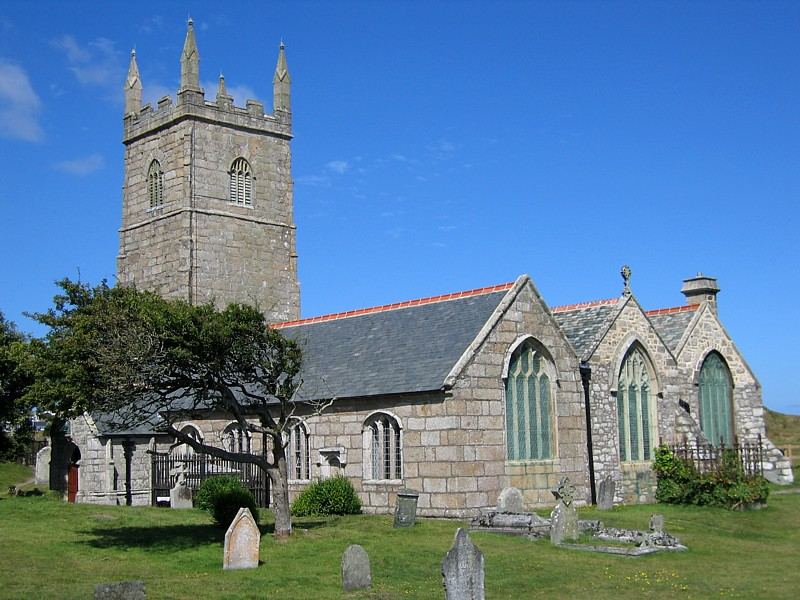
- St Uny Church
- St Uny Church, Lelant
- 50°11′17″N 05°26′06″W
- OS grid reference: SW548377
- Denomination: Church of England
- Churchmanship: Broad Church

History
- Dedication: St Uny

Administration
- Province: Canterbury
- Diocese: Truro
- Archdeaconry: Cornwall
- Parish: Lelant, Cornwall

Clergy
- Priest: The Revd Etienne van Blerk
- Location within Cornwall

Listed Building – Grade I
- Official name: Church of St Uny
- Designated: 4 June 1952
- Reference no.: 1143403

St Uny Church, Lelant, is the Church of England parish church of Lelant, Cornwall, England. It is dedicated to Saint Uny (or Euny) who is also the patron saint of Redruth. It is a Grade I listed building.

== History and description ==
The church is medieval and entirely built of granite. Parts of the nave arcades are Norman, but all of the windows are Perpendicular in style. In about 1150 the church was given to Tywardreath Priory; later the priory sold it to Bishop Bronescombe of Exeter. In 1272 Bishop Bronescombe appropriated it to Crediton collegiate church and the cure of souls became a vicarage. In the late 15th and early 16th centuries, the vicars of Lelant resisted the demands of the inhabitants of Towednack and St Ives for rights of sepulture in those places. When this was conceded in 1542 the vicars moved their residence to St Ives where they remained for three centuries. An early reference to the church is in 1170, when Thomas Becket, Archbishop of Canterbury, referred to "The Church of Saint Euni". The feast of St Uny is observed on the first day of February. Like many other churches in Cornwall, St Uny has a copy of a letter from King Charles thanking the people of Lelant for their support during the English Civil War.

The depositions of the Exeter Consistory Court in 1572 include an altercation that occurred in Lelant church "Wm Hawysche, of Lelant, tynner, from birth resident, aged 40, sayeth that upon Dew Whallan Gwa Metten in Eglos De Lalant, viz. upon all hallow day late paste about the mydds of the service in the parish church of Lalant Moryshe David’s wife and Cicely James came into the church of Lalant together and in chiding with words together Cycely called Agnes Davey whore and whore bitch in English and not in Cornowok." This confirms that the Cornish language was the normal language of use in the parish at that time and that it was unusual to hear English being spoken. It is also an important record of the Cornish names for the Cornish language Kernowek and of Allhallowtide as Kalan Gwav (Dy Halan Gwav for All Saints' Day, Nos Kalan Gwav for Hallowe'en), also known as Allantide in Cornwall and Calan Gaeaf in Wales.

At the beginning of the 18th century, the church was in a bad state of repair, due to wind-blown sand, and in 1727 a rate (or bounty money) of £263 15s was levied in the parish to meet the repairs. In 1731 there is an entry in the churchwardens' records of payment of one shilling for one day's work of carrying sand out of the church. The church was, again, restored in 1873, at a cost of £1,175, by J. D. Sedding. During the night of 12 December 1878, the north-west pinnacle of the tower was struck by lightning. On examining the tower it was noticed that the flooring of the bell-chamber was rotten and had almost disappeared; the bells were supported by the frame alone. Funding was diverted from the building of the cathedral at Truro to make the tower safe, and the tower repaired and bells rehung in January 1880.

The church has fine memorials to two William Praeds, dated 1620 and 1833 (the Praeds' home was at Trevethow in the parish), and also buried here are Henry Jenner (1848–1934) who was the first Grand Bard of the Gorseth Kernow, and the artist Peter Lanyon (1918–1964).

== Crosses ==
There are four medieval wheelhead crosses nearby, all Listed building#Grade II. One moved to the left of the porch, two South of the church in the churchyard and a fourth in the centre of the cemetery West of the church.

== Organ ==
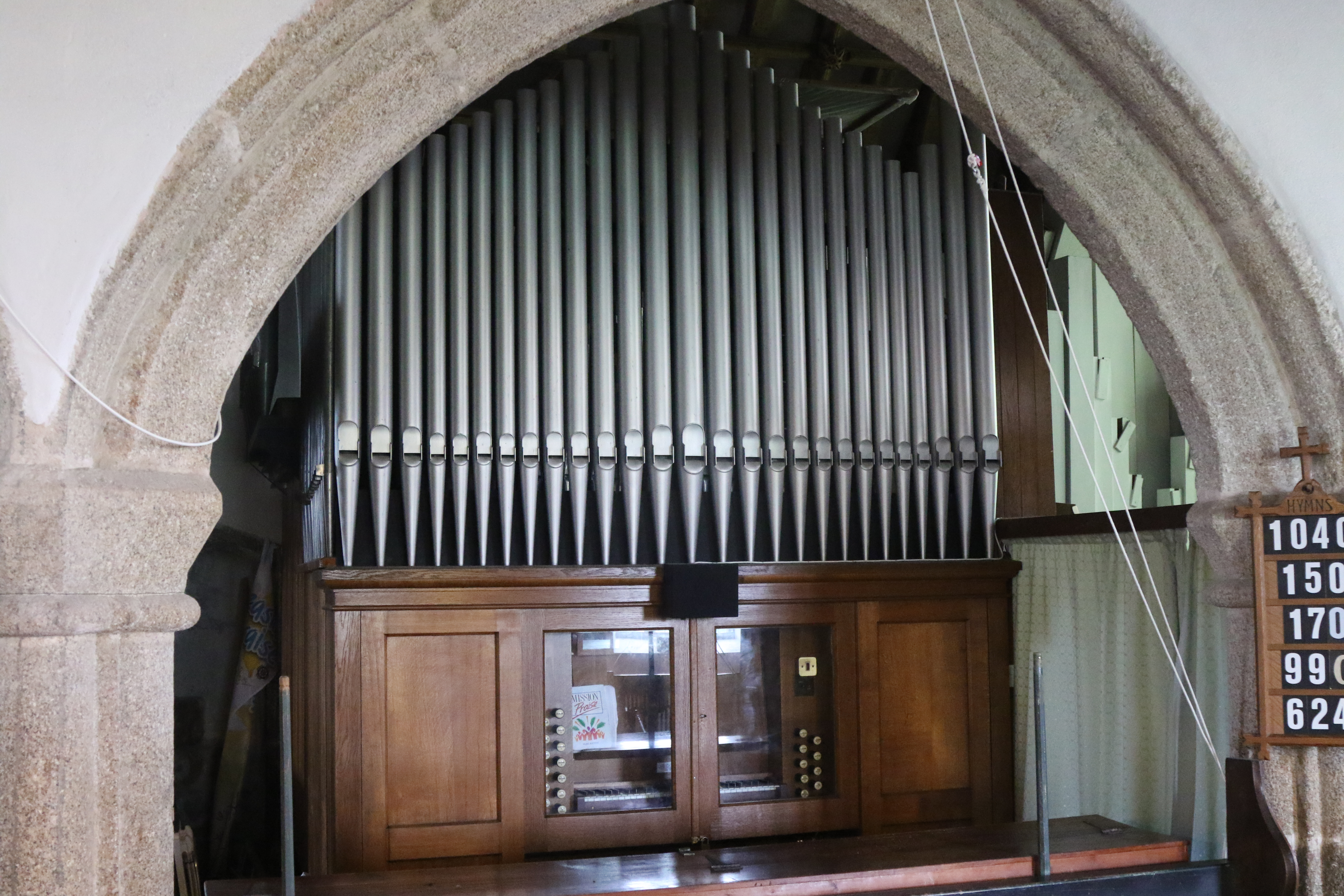
Pipe organ by John Hele 1913

A new organ was installed in the north chancel by John Hele of London, Exeter and Plymouth at a cost of £415 (equivalent to £41,400 in 2025) and opened on 13 May 1913. It was later moved to the west end of the north aisle, but returned to its original location in 1989. A specification of the organ can be found on the National Pipe Organ Register.

== Bells ==
The church tower contains six bells by John Taylor of Loughborough. The oldest two date from 1836.

== External References ==
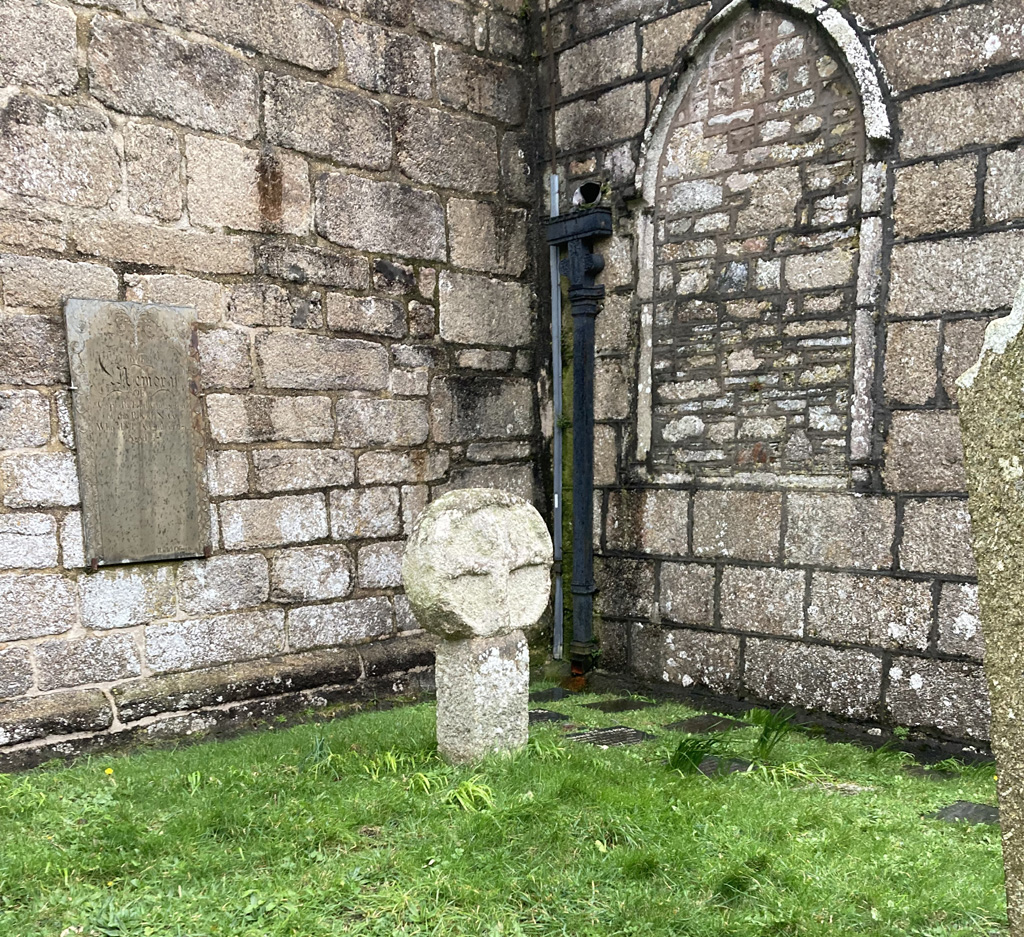
cross adjacent to porch

- Listed Building website for St Uny's with links to pages for each cross
