= John Knill =

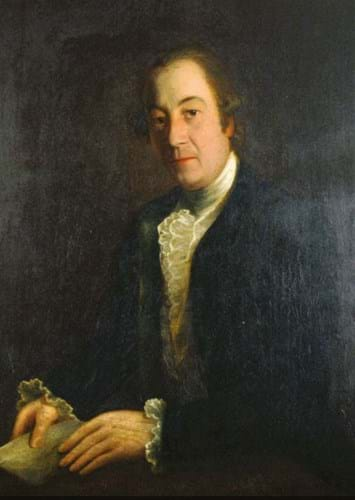
- A 1777 painting of Knill
- Born: 1 January 1733; Callington, Cornwall, England
- Died: 29 March 1811 (aged 78); London, England
- Resting place: St Andrew's Church, Holborn, London, England
- Occupations: Lawyer, Collector of Customs
- Known for: Knill's Monument and associated ceremonies every five years

John Knill (1 January 1733 – 29 March 1811) was an English attorney who served as the Collector of Customs at St Ives, Cornwall, from 1762 to 1782.

Knill is primarily remembered for having his own memorial constructed, a 50-foot-high (15 m) three-sided granite obelisk (Note: The monument is called a pyramid in some sources.) known as Knill's Steeple (also known as Knill's Monument or "The Steeple"), which still stands. It was sited on the summit of Worvas Hill with views over St Ives Bay with intention that he should be interred in a vault within it; however, he was laid to rest in London. Slightly eccentric, Knill left money and specific instructions in his will for a celebration to be held in St Ives every five years, which continues and was most recently observed in 2026.

== Biography ==
Knill was an attorney in Penzance, Cornwall, although little is known of his early life. He may have been a descendant of the namesake family of Knill, Herefordshire, which he visited in 1792, but this is uncertain.

From 1762 to 1782, Knill served as the Collector of Customs at St Ives, Cornwall. The Cornishman newspaper claimed that he was engaged in privateering and, according to local tradition, he took he part in the smuggling trade. He was elected mayor of St Ives in 1767, although the duration of his term is unclear. During his time as mayor, he was responsible for St Ives building its first pier. From March 1773 to May 1774, Knill made a trip to the Colony of Jamaica, collecting taxes for King George III. It was during this assignment that Knill made his fortune.

In 1777, Knill became the private secretary to John Hobart, 2nd Earl of Buckinghamshire, the newly made Lord Lieutenant of Ireland. Although Knill left Dublin and returned to St Ives after six months in the post, their friendship continued and Knill became a trustee of Hobart's estate upon his death in 1793. (Note: Hobart is interred at Blickling Park mausoleum, a pyramidal structure in Norfolk commissioned by his daughter in 1793.) From 1779 to 1782, Knill was involved in a search for treasure believed to have been buried by the pirate Henry Avery in the area of Lizard Point, Cornwall. Knill was admitted as a member of Gray's Inn Square in London in 1778, purchased chambers there in 1781, and began living there at some point after 1784. Between 1784 and 1800, Knill undertook a series of six tours of England on horseback, the longest of which occurred in 1790 when he rode 630 miles (1,010 km).

A lifelong bachelor, Knill died on 29 March 1811 in London at his chambers in Gray's Inn Square, and is buried in London at St Andrew's Church in Holborn.

== Legacy ==
=== Monument ===
Knill's Monument
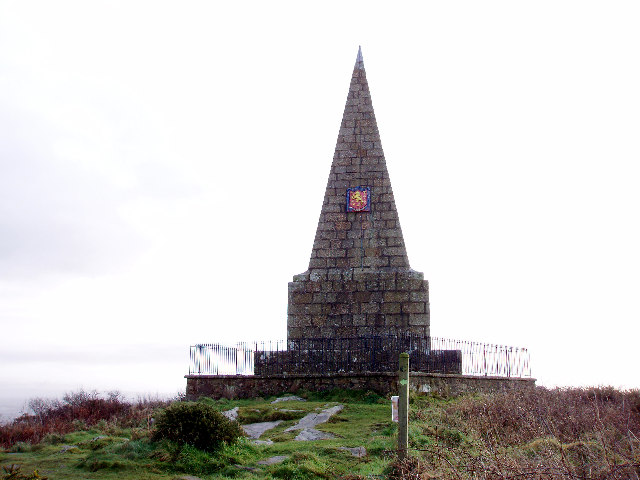

- Location within Cornwall
- 50.1958°N 5.4815°W
- Location: St Ives, Cornwall, England

Listed Building – Grade II*
- Official name: Knill's Monument, Worvas
- Designated: 4 June 1952
- Reference no.: 1143386

Knill had a three-sided granite obelisk built on the summit of Worvas Hill overlooking St Ives Bay. It was designed by architect John Wood, the Younger, and was constructed in 1782. The cost of the monument was £226 1s 6d (equivalent to £34,005 in 2025), including five guineas to the owner of the land, Lord Arundel. The monument is 50 feet (15 m) high and on one side is the Knill coat of arms including the motto Nil desperandum (Never despair) with Resurgam (I shall arise) carved above it; on another side are the words Johannes Knill. 1782.; and on the third side I know that my Redeemer liveth. There is, in the interior, a huge granite coffin, presumedly for his body.

It has been surmised that the building of the monument was because, as Knill wrote in a 1782 letter, he abhorred the practice of burial "within the body of the Church". He castigated the repeated use of consecrated ground for burial, which mirrored a contemporary minor philosophical movement. Certainly, the parish church nearest to Knill's residence (St Ia) has, in modern times, a greatly raised churchyard partly as a result of this practice, being over seven feet (2.1 m) higher than the pavements and walkways which lead around it. However, Knill's work and official appointments led him away from St Ives and his intended mausoleum, and his philosophical rapprochement with ecclesiastical interment may or may not have occurred.

The monument on Worvas Hill is above the 170-metre (560 ft) contour and is a prominent landmark which vessels off the coast use as a navigation aid. It is a Grade II* listed structure.

=== Quintennial celebrations ===
In his will, Knill left money for the upkeep of his monument and for celebrations to take place every five years on the Feast of Saint James, 25 July. (Note: If 25 July falls on a Sunday, the Knill celebration is held on 26 July.) He directed that every five years, £25 should be expended, including on a dinner for St Ives officials, and that 10 young girls dressed in white should walk in procession with music, from the market house to the monument, around which the whole party was to dance. After dancing for 15 minutes, participants are to sing Psalm 100, "All People that on Earth do Dwell". The first ceremony, which took place within Knill's lifetime, was held on 25 July 1801.

Knill directed the £25 to be spent thusly:

- £10 for a dinner for the Trustees, who are the Mayor, Vicar, and Customs Officer, and two guests each. This to take place at the George and Dragon Inn, Market Place, St Ives.
- £5 to ten young girls who have to be the daughters of either fishermen, tinners, or seamen.
- £1 to the fiddler.
- £2 to two widows (to accompany the young girls).
- £5 to the man and wife, widower or widow who shall raise the greatest family of legitimate children who have reached the age of ten years.
- £1 for white ribbon for breast knots.
- £1 to be set aside for a vellum book for the Clerk to the Trustees to record the proceedings.

This quintennial commemoration is made the occasion for a good deal of jollity, in which the entire population joins, indeed the whole proceeding is quite mirth-provoking; nor is the least laughable part of it the looks on the faces of the vicar and mayor, as they sedately waltz around on the upper step of the monument, hand in hand with the young girls.

The 45th ceremony was held on 26 July 2021 (as 25 July was a Sunday). The 10 dancing girls were paid £5 each, two widows £10 each, and the fiddler £25. After assembling at the Guildhall, the girls danced up to the Malakoff, (Note: Malakoff is "an open space that provides views of St Ives Harbour.") led by the fiddler. At the Malakoff, they were transported up to Knill's Monument in buses.

=== Notable dates ===
- The 200th anniversary of Knill's death occurred on 29 March 2011
- The 46th, and most recent, ceremony took place on 25 July 2026
