= St Erth railway station =

Railway station in Cornwall, England

St Erth

General information
- Location: St Erth, Cornwall; England
- Coordinates: 50.17140°N 5.44374°W
- Grid reference: SW541357
- Manager: Great Western Railway
- Platforms: 3

Other information
- Station code: SER
- Classification: DfT category E

History
- Original company: West Cornwall Railway
- Pre-grouping: Great Western Railway
- Post-grouping: Great Western Railway

Key dates
- 11 March 1852: Opened as St Ives Road
- 1 June 1877: St Ives branch opened
- 1 June 1877: Renamed as St Erth

Passengers
- 2021/22: ▲0.386 million
- Interchange: ▲0.210 million
- 2022/23: ▼0.365 million
- Interchange: ▲0.231 million
- 2023/24: ▲0.396 million
- Interchange: ▲0.242 million
- 2024/25: ▲0.445 million
- Interchange: ▲0.266 million
- 2025/26: ▲0.470 million
- Interchange: ▲0.284 million

Listed Building – Grade II
- Feature: St Erth Station
- Designated: 14 January 1988
- Reference no.: 1143618
Location
Notes
- Passenger statistics from the Office of Rail and Road

St Erth railway station is a Grade II listed station situated at Rose-an-Grouse in Cornwall, United Kingdom. It serves the nearby village of St Erth, which is about 0.75 miles (1.21 km) away, and is the junction for the St Ives Bay Line to St Ives. The station is 320 miles 78 chains (320.98 mi; 516.6 km) from the zero point at London Paddington measured via Box and Plymouth Millbay. The station is managed by Great Western Railway, which serves the station alongside CrossCountry.

== History ==
The station was opened by the West Cornwall Railway on 11 March 1852. At this time it was known as St Ives Road and was the railhead for that town, which lies about 4 miles (6.4 km) to the north. This was an important harbour with a busy fishing trade and tin and copper mines; the new railway brought it artists and then tourists. The station was a simple single platform situated on the north side of the line.

On 1 June 1877 a branch line was opened from here to St Ives, which was when the station was renamed 'St Erth'. The station building was reconstructed in granite and a second track was laid on the north side of the platform for branch line trains, but the main line still had only the one track. This was partly rectified in about 1894 when a loop line with its own platform was opened, but the line was only doubled eastwards to Hayle on 10 September 1899, and westwards to Marazion on 16 June 1929. Beyond the St Ives branch platform was the station goods yard and sidings which served a china clay dry for a few years. It then served milk trains from the Primrose Dairy creamery, later operated by United Dairies, although these were taken out of use in 1982. A camping coach was positioned here by the Western Region from 1953 to 1964, there were two coaches here for the last three years.

Preceding station	Historical railways	Following station
Marazion	Great Western Railway; Cornish Main Line	Hayle
Terminus	Great Western Railway; St Ives Branch	Lelant

== Facilities ==
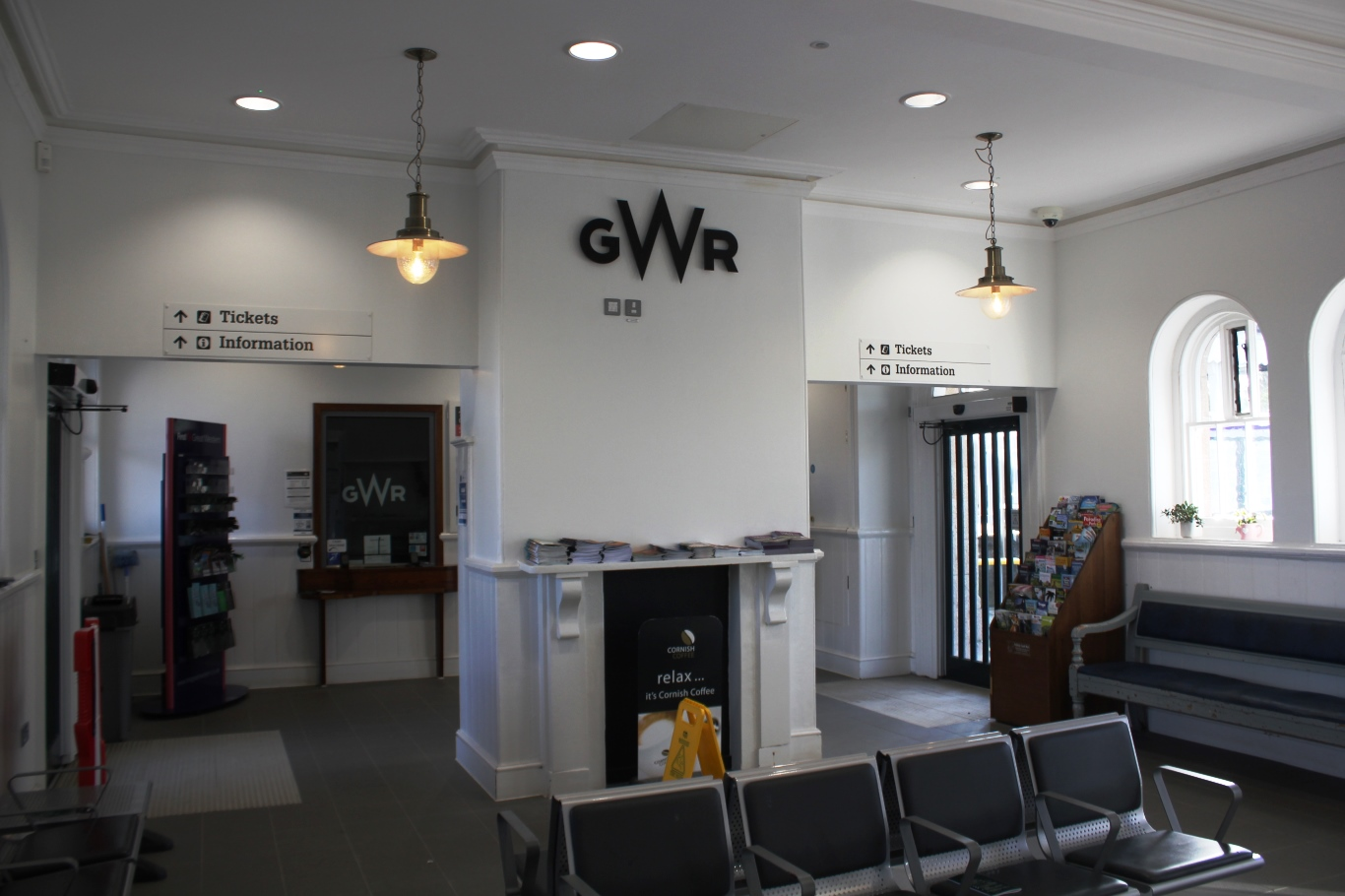
New ticket office opened in 2017

The station buildings are constructed of granite in an 'L' shape west and north of the St Ives bay platform. The booking office is staffed for part of the day and is located in the west-facing section which faces the North car park. Just next to this building is the station cafe, which appeared in a list of the ten best station cafes published in The Guardian in 2009. Platforms 2 and 3 have a long canopy above them to protect passengers waiting for their train.

In 2017, a new concourse and ticket office was opened in St Erth, replacing the old ticket office which was smaller. The new building now includes toilet facilities and a waiting lounge, including a medium-sized ticket office with two windows. This process also included upgraded step-free access to the concourse and to platforms 2 & 3. A new entrance to platforms 2 & 3 near to the station café was also built, next to an also new private building for staff only. In 2019, a new park and ride opened at St Erth, replacing the previous one at Lelant Saltings. This brought the addition of a new car park at the south side of the station and expanding of the car park at the north side of the station, creating over 500 parking spaces at the station.

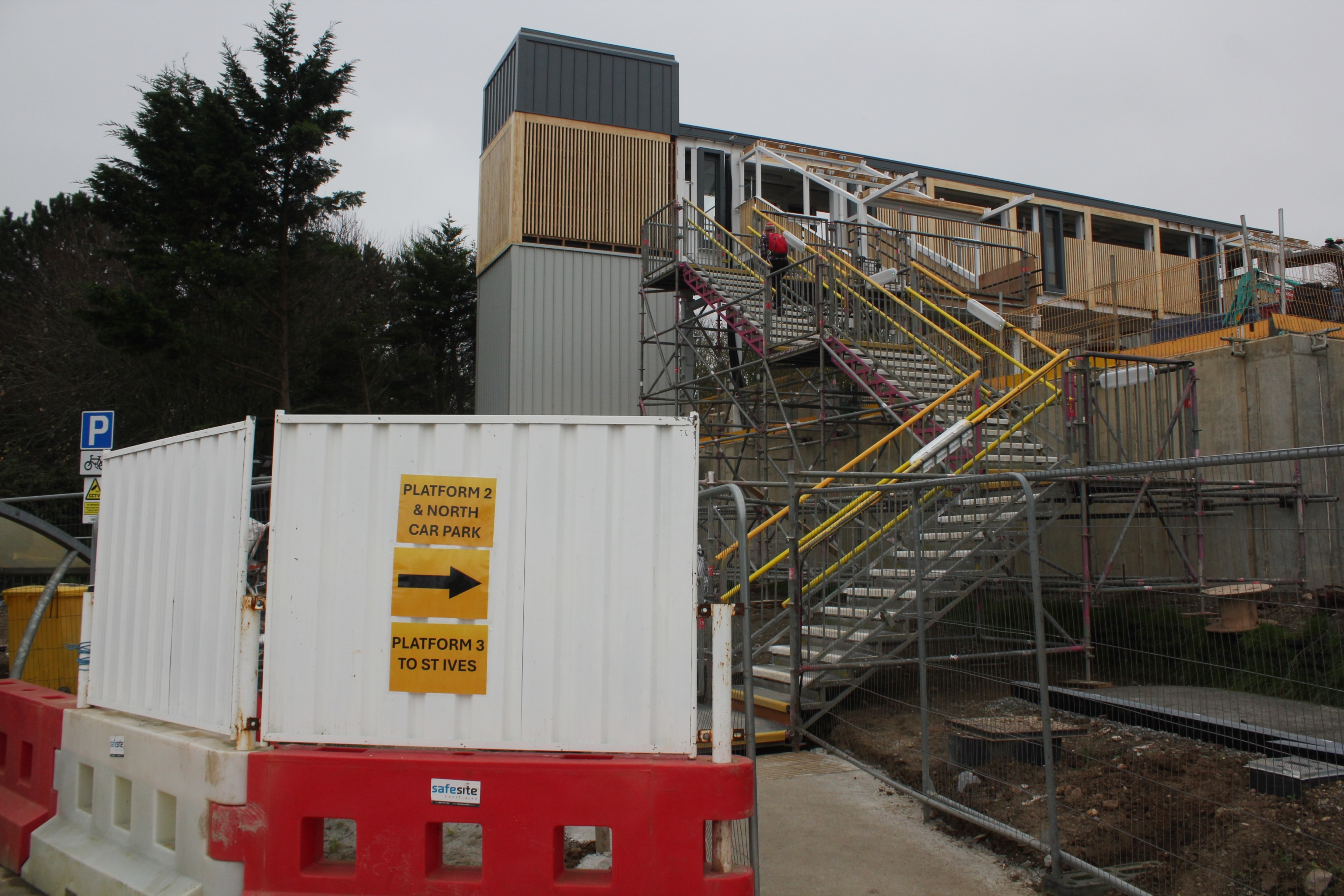
New footbridge being built in 2024

A replacement footbridge with lifts was installed in 2025 to enable step-free access to the whole station. The work was due to be completed in spring 2024, but was later pushed back to the end of 2024. The original footbridge was dismantled in October 2024 and donated to the East Somerset Railway; they plan to install it at Cranmore railway station by the end of 2025. The span of the new footbridge, which weighed 50 tonnes (50,000 kg), was lifted into place by a 1,000-tonne (1,000,000 kg) crane in October 2024, with temporary staircases being used until permanent staircases are erected. The project provoked discussion: it was supported by local MP Derek Thomas and Connor Donnithorne, the cabinet member responsible for transport at Cornwall Council, while some residents opposed the plans. One local historian said that the station would be "losing a valuable asset", replaced by a poorly-designed "eyesore". The new footbridge officially opened on 14 November 2025.

== Platform layout ==
- Platform 1 is the westbound platform and is used by almost all services to Penzance, with the exception of those originating from St Ives.
- Platform 2 is the eastbound platform and is predominantly used for services towards Truro, Plymouth, Exeter, London and Bristol, as well as a small number of services that go to St Ives from Penzance.
- Platform 3 is a bay platform that is exclusively used by trains to/from St Ives.

Because the main line is on a falling gradient towards Hayle, at the buffer stop end of platform 3 a few steps are needed to connect platforms 2 and 3 but at the east end they are nearly level. Standing at this end of the station the line to St Ives curves away to the left over Western Growers Crossing towards the covered way beneath the A30 road. The Cornish Main Line towards Hayle drops gently to the right with the signal box situated between the two. The Down Sidings on the right of the main line are level and so are higher than the main line at the far end. In 2022, platform 3 was extended by 6 metres (20 feet) to allow it to accommodate a train with five carriages.

There is a crossover at the west end of the station which makes platform 2 a bi-directional platform. Trains arriving at platform 1 are able to shunt to platform 2 using this crossover if a service is unable to continue to Penzance, or trains arriving at platform 2 from the Penzance direction can also use the crossover to connect back to the down line and into that direction again. This is used by the few trains from St Ives that continue to Penzance.

== Signalling ==
A Class 802 passes the signal box as it arrives at St Erth bound for Penzance

The signal box is situated at the east end of the station between the main line and the St Ives branch. It was opened on 10 September 1899 when the main line was doubled to Hayle and replaced an earlier box that dated from around the time of the opening of the St Ives branch. Semaphore signals still control movements around the station. The signal box also controls trains on the St Ives branch.

== Services ==
A pairing of Class 150 units in the St Ives bay platform

St Erth is served by two train operating companies, which provide the following general off-peak service pattern in trains per hour/day (tph/tpd):

Great Western Railway

- 2 tph to Penzance
- 2 tph to Plymouth; of which:
  - 1 tp2h continues to Exeter St Davids
  - 1 tp2h continues to London Paddington, via Exeter St Davids, Taunton and Reading
- 2 tph to St Ives, on the St Ives Bay Line. A small number of services are extended to and from Penzance too.

The Night Riviera sleeper:

- 1 tpd to Penzance
- 1 tpd to London Paddington.

CrossCountry:

- 2 tpd to Penzance
- 1 tpd to Edinburgh Waverley, via Bristol Temple Meads, Birmingham New Street, Leeds and York
- 1 tpd to Birmingham New Street (Bristol Temple Meads on a Saturday and Plymouth on a Sunday)

Preceding station	National Rail	Following station
Penzance	Great Western Railway; Cornish Main Line	Hayle
Penzance	CrossCountry; Cornish Main Line	Hayle
Terminus	Great Western Railway St Ives Bay Line	Lelant Saltings towards St Ives
