= Long Rock, Marazion and St Erth =

Electoral division of Cornwall in the UK

- ward Cornwall Council
- Boundary of Long Rock, Marazion and St Erth in Cornwall from 2021.
- County: Cornwall

Current ward
- Created: 2021
- Councillor: John Martin (Liberal Democrat)
- Number of councillors: One
- Created from: Ludgvan; Marazion and Perranuthnoe; Gwinear-Gwithian and St Erth

Long Rock, Marazion and St Erth is an electoral division of Cornwall in the United Kingdom which returns one member to sit on Cornwall Council. It was created at the 2021 local elections, being formed primarily from parts of the former divisions of Marazion and Perranuthnoe and Gwinear-Gwithian and St Erth, as well as with a small part of the Ludgvan division. The current councillor is John Martin, a Liberal Democrat.

== Extent ==
The division represents the town of Marazion, the villages of Long Rock, Goldsithney, Perranuthnoe, St Hilary, St Erth, and the hamlets of Rosudgeon, Perran Downs, Relubbus, Gwallon, St Erth Praze and Rose-an-Grouse. The hamlet of Millpool is shared with the Porthleven, Breage and Germoe division; a small part of the hamlet of Canon's Town is covered by the division, with most of it being in the St Ives East, Lelant and Carbis Bay division. St Michael's Mount is also included in the division.

== Councillors ==
Election	Member	Party
2021	Tara Sherfield-Wong	Conservative
2023	John Martin	Liberal Democrat

== Election results ==
=== 2023 by-election ===
A by-election was held after Tara Sherfield-Wong resigned in 2022 for health reasons. Sherfield-Wong had faced claims that she was neglecting her role, including by five parish councils in her division. Upon his election, Martin said his win "sends a message of discontent" about plans for a Mayor of Cornwall.

16 February 2023 by-election: Long Rock, Marazion & St Erth
Party	Candidate	Votes	%	±%
Liberal Democrats	John Martin	811	45.4	▲22.1
Conservative	Will Elliott	503	28.1	▼8.1
Green	Catherine Hayes	244	13.6	▲2.5
Labour	Nastassia Player	230	12.9	▲1.3
Majority		308	17.2	▲4.3
Rejected ballots		0	0.0	▼0.5
Turnout		1788	32.4	▼11.1
Registered electors		5,527		
Liberal Democrats gain from Conservative		Swing		

=== 2021 election ===
2021 election: Long Rock, Marazion & St Erth
Party	Candidate	Votes	%	±%
Conservative	Tara Sherfield-Wong	874	36.2	N/A
Liberal Democrats	Bill Mumford	563	23.3	N/A
Independent	Angelo Spencer-Smith	419	17.3	N/A
Labour	Nastassia Player	280	11.6	N/A
Green	Colin Pringle	267	11.1	N/A
Majority		311	12.9	N/A
Rejected ballots		13	0.5	N/A
Turnout		2416	43.5	N/A
Registered electors		5558		
Conservative win (new seat)				
