= St Ives West and Towednack =

Electoral division of Cornwall in the UK

- ward Cornwall Council
- Boundary of St Ives West and Towednack in Cornwall from 2021.
- County: Cornwall

Current ward
- Created: 2021
- Councillor: Andrew Mitchell (Independent)
- Number of councillors: One
- Created from: St Ives West; St Ives East

St Ives West and Towednack (Cornish: Porthia West ha Tewydnek) is an electoral division of Cornwall in the United Kingdom which returns one member to sit on Cornwall Council. It was created at the 2021 local elections, being formed from St Ives West and part of the former division of St Ives East. The current councillor is Andrew Mitchell, an independent.

== Extent ==
St Ives West and Towednack covers part of the town of St Ives (including the suburb of Penbeagle, the village of Halsetown and the hamlets of Hellesveor and Trevalgan) as well as the parish of Towednack (including the village of Nancledra and the hamlets of Amalveor, Amalebra, Georgia and part of Cripplesease).

The division did not originally include Nancledra or Cripplesease, but these areas were added by the Cornwall (Electoral Changes) Order 2021 when they became part of the parish of Towednack.

== Election results ==
=== 2021 election ===
2021 election: St Ives West and Towednack
Party	Candidate	Votes	%	±%
Independent	Andrew Mitchell (Note: Incumbent councillor, formerly representing St Ives West)	983	45.2	
Conservative	Rachel Bradford	512	23.5	
Green	Lisa Arthur Gibbons	421	19.4	
Labour	Marion Beveridge	251	11.5	
Majority		471	21.7	
Rejected ballots		8	0.4	
Turnout		2175	43.0	
Registered electors		5057		
Independent win (new seat)				

=== 2025 election ===
2025 election: St Ives West and Towednack
Party	Candidate	Votes	%	±%
Independent	Andrew Mitchell	773	41.4	−3.8
Liberal Democrats	Paul Kennedy	611	32.7	New
Reform	Keith Andrews	397	21.3	New
Conservative	Chris Paulin	75	4.0	−19.5
Majority		162	8.7	−13.0
Rejected ballots		10	0.5	+0.1
Turnout		1866	39.2	−3.8
Registered electors		4,755		
Independent hold				
