= Marazion and Perranuthnoe (electoral division) =

Former electoral division of Cornwall in the UK

- Former ward Cornwall Council
- Boundary of Marazion and Perranuthnoe in from 2013-2021.
- County: Cornwall

2013–2021
- Number of councillors: One
- Replaced by: Long Rock, Marazion and St Erth
- Created from: Marazion

Marazion and Perranuthnoe (Cornish: Marghasyow ha Peranudhnow) was an electoral division of Cornwall in the United Kingdom which returned one member to sit on Cornwall Council between 2013 and 2021. It was abolished at the 2021 local elections, being succeeded by Long Rock, Marazion and St Erth.

== Councillors ==
| Election | Member | Party |
|---|---|---|
| 2013 | Sue Nicholas | Conservative |
| 2017 | Sue Nicholas | Conservative |
| 2021 | Seat abolished | |

== Extent ==
Marazion and Perranuthnoe represented the town of Marazion (including St Michael's Mount), the villages of Goldsithney, St Hilary and Perranuthnoe, and the hamlets of Perran Downs, Higher Downs and Rosudgeon. The hamlet of Gwallon was shared with the Ludgvan division and the hamlet of Relubbus was shared with the Gwinear-Gwithian and St Erth division. The division covered 1928 hectares in total.

== Election results ==
=== 2017 election ===
2017 election: Marazion and Perranuthnoe
| Party | Candidate | Votes | % | ±% |
|---|---|---|---|---|
| Conservative | Sue Nicholas | 741 | 45.9 | ▲4.6 |
| Liberal Democrats | Nigel Walker | 734 | 45.5 | New |
| UKIP | Treve Green | 136 | 8.4 | ▼28.1 |
| Majority | | 7 | 0.4 | ▼4.4 |
| Rejected ballots | | 3 | 0.2 | ▼1.4 |
| Turnout | | 1614 | 44.6 | ▲7.0 |
| Conservative hold | | Swing | | |

=== 2013 election ===
2013 election: Marazion and Perranuthnoe
| Party | Candidate | Votes | % | ±% |
|---|---|---|---|---|
| Conservative | Sue Nicholas | 578 | 41.3 | |
| UKIP | Glyn Owen | 511 | 36.5 | |
| Green | Peter Williams | 289 | 20.6 | |
| Majority | | 67 | 4.8 | |
| Rejected ballots | | 23 | 1.6 | |
| Turnout | | 1401 | 37.6 | |
| Conservative win (new seat) | | | | |
