= Ludgvan (electoral division) =

Former electoral division of Cornwall in the UK

- Former ward Cornwall Council
- Boundary of Ludgvan in Cornwall from 2013-2021.
- County: Cornwall

2013–2021
- Number of councillors: One
- Replaced by: Ludgvan, Madron, Gulval and Heamoor; Long Rock, Marazion and St Erth; St Ives East, Lelant and Carbis Bay; St Ives West and Towednack
- Created from: Ludgvan

2009–2013
- Number of councillors: One
- Replaced by: Ludgvan
- Created from: Council created

Ludgvan (Cornish: Lujuan) was an electoral division of Cornwall in the United Kingdom which returned one member to sit on Cornwall Council between 2009 and 2021. It was abolished at the 2021 local elections, being split between Ludgvan, Madron, Gulval and Heamoor, Long Rock, Marazion and St Erth, St Ives East, Lelant and Carbis Bay, and St Ives West and Towednack.

The same name was also used for a division of Cornwall Council between 1973 and 2009 which returned one member, and a division of Penwith District Council which returned 3 members between 1973 and 2004.

== Cornwall Council division ==
=== Extent ===
Ludgvan covered the villages of Long Rock, Crowlas, Morvah, Zennor and Ludgvan, and the hamlets of Vellanoweth, Cockwells, Whitecross, Lelant Downs, Carfury, Mulfra, Boskednan, Tredinneck, Lower Ninnes, Trevowhan, Rosemergy, Treen, Trewey and Boswednack. The village of Nancledra and the hamlet of Cripplesease were shared with the St Ives West division and the hamlets of Rose-an-Grouse and Canon's Town were shared with the Gwinear-Gwithian and St Erth division.

The division was redistricted during boundary changes at the 2013 election. From 2009 to 2013, the division covered 6113 hectares; after boundary changes in 2013 it covered 6624 hectares.

=== Councillors ===
Election	Member	Party
2009	Irene Bailey	Independent
2013	Roy Mann	Conservative
2017	Simon Elliot	Conservative
2021	Seat abolished	

=== Election results ===
==== 2017 election ====
2017 election: Ludgvan
Party	Candidate	Votes	%	±%
Conservative	Simon Elliot	547	34.3	
Independent	Roy Mann	464	29.1	
Liberal Democrats	Bill Mumford	345	21.6	
Labour	Mark Hassall	152	9.5	
Green	Ian Flindall	80	5.0	
Majority		83	5.2	
Rejected ballots		7	0.4	
Turnout		1595	48.1	
Conservative hold		Swing		

==== 2013 election ====
2013 election: Ludgvan
Party	Candidate	Votes	%	±%
Conservative	Roy Mann	477	39.8	
UKIP	Robert Smith	426	35.6	
Green	Ian Flindall	283	23.6	
Majority		51	4.3	
Rejected ballots		12	1.0	
Turnout		1198	35.0	
Conservative gain from Independent		Swing		

==== 2009 election ====
2009 election: Ludgvan
Party	Candidate	Votes	%	±%
Independent	Irene Bailey	584	38.6	
Conservative	Roy Mann	469	31.0	
Green	Mark Russell	198	13.1	
UKIP	Robert Smith	130	8.6	
Liberal Democrats	Caroline White	123	8.1	
Majority		115	7.6	
Rejected ballots		10	0.7	
Turnout		1514	44.9	
Independent win (new seat)				

== Penwith District Council ==
Ludgvan
- Former ward Penwith District Council
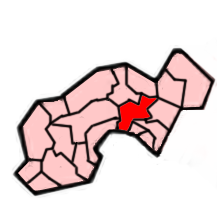
- Boundary of Ludgvan in Penwith.
- County: Cornwall

1973–2003
- Number of councillors: Three
- Replaced by: Ludgvan and Towednack
- Created from: Council created

=== Councillors ===
Election	First member	First party	Second member	Second party	Third member	Third party
1973 (all seats)	H. Lutey	Independent	H. Monk	Independent	R. Hall	Independent
1976 (all seats)	H. Lutey	Independent	A. Bailey (Note: Recorded as I. Bailey at the 1982 and 1986 elections by source)	Independent	A. Penhaul	Independent
1979 (all seats)	H. Lutey	Independent	A. Bailey	Independent	J. Vincent	Independent
1980 (seat 3)	H. Lutey	Independent	A. Bailey	Independent	J. Vincent	Independent
1982 (seat 2)	H. Lutey	Independent	A. Bailey	Independent	J. Vincent	Independent
1983 (seat 1)	H. Lutey	Independent	A. Bailey	Independent	J. Vincent	Independent
1984 (seat 3)	H. Lutey	Independent	A. Bailey	Independent	J. Vincent	Independent
1986 (seat 2)	H. Lutey	Independent	A. Bailey	Independent	J. Vincent	Independent
1987 (seat 1)	W. Badcock (Note: Recorded as N. Badcock at the 1991 election by source)	Conservative	A. Bailey	Independent	J. Vincent	Independent
1988 (seat 3)	W. Badcock	Conservative	A. Bailey	Independent	N. Osborne	Conservative
1990 (seat 2)	W. Badcock	Conservative	A. Bailey	Independent	N. Osborne	Conservative
1991 (seat 1)	W. Badcock	Conservative	A. Bailey	Independent	N. Osborne	Conservative
1992 (seat 3)	W. Badcock	Conservative	A. Bailey	Independent	R. Mann	Liberal Democrats
1994 (seat 2)	W. Badcock	Conservative	A. Bailey	Independent	R. Mann	Liberal Democrats
1995 (seat 1)	N. Richards	Independent	A. Bailey	Independent	R. Mann	Liberal Democrats
1996 (seat 3)	N. Richards	Independent	A. Bailey	Independent	R. Mann	Independent
1998 (seat 2)	N. Richards	Independent	A. Bailey	Independent	R. Mann	Independent
1999 (seat 1)	H. Smith	Conservative	A. Bailey	Independent	R. Mann	Independent
2000 (seat 3)	H. Smith	Conservative	A. Bailey	Independent	R. Mann	Independent
2002 (seat 2)	H. Smith	Conservative	A. Bailey	Independent	R. Mann	Independent
2003 (seat 1)	H. Smith	Conservative	A. Bailey	Independent	R. Mann	Independent
