= St Ives West (electoral division) =

Former electoral division of Cornwall in the UK

- Former ward Cornwall Council
- Boundary of St Ives West in from 2013-2021.
- County: Cornwall

2013–2021
- Number of councillors: One
- Replaced by: St Ives West and Towednack
- Created from: St Ives North; St Ives South

St Ives West (Cornish: Porthia West) was an electoral division of Cornwall in the United Kingdom which returned one member to sit on Cornwall Council from 2013 to 2021. It was abolished at the 2021 local elections, being succeeded by St Ives West and Towednack.

== Councillors ==
Election	Member	Party
2013	Andrew Mitchell	Independent
2017	Andrew Mitchell	Independent
2021	Seat abolished	

== Extent ==
St Ives West represented the west part of the town of St Ives, the villages of Halsetown and Towednack as well as the hamlets of Amalveor, Georgia, and Trevalgan. Parts of Nancledra and Cripplesease were also included, with both being divided between the divisions of St Ives West and Ludgvan. It covered 1684 hectares in total.

== Election results ==
=== 2017 election ===
2017 election: St Ives West
Party	Candidate	Votes	%	±%
Independent	Andrew Mitchell	446	33.9	
Conservative	Kevin Hughes	236	17.9	
Independent	Colenso Nicholls	235	17.8	
Labour	Rex Henry	200	15.2	
Liberal Democrats	Pauline Attwood	118	9.0	
Majority		210	15.9	
Rejected ballots		19	1.4	
Turnout		1317	41.2	
Independent hold		Swing		

=== 2013 election ===
2013 election: St Ives West
Party	Candidate	Votes	%	±%
Independent	Andrew Mitchell	308	33.3	
Green	Ron Tulley	301	32.5	
Conservative	Joan Tanner	124	13.4	
Labour	Malcolm Hurst	111	12.0	
Liberal Democrats	Lester Scott	66	7.1	
Majority		7	0.8	
Rejected ballots		15	1.6	
Turnout		925	28.5	
Independent win (new seat)				
