= St Ives East, Lelant and Carbis Bay =

Electoral division of Cornwall in the UK

- ward Cornwall Council
- Boundary of St Ives East, Lelant and Carbis Bay in Cornwall from 2021.
- County: Cornwall

Current ward
- Created: 2021
- Councillor: Luke Rogers (Liberal Democrats)
- Number of councillors: One
- Created from: St Ives East; Lelant and Carbis Bay; Ludgvan

St Ives East, Lelant and Carbis Bay (Cornish: Porthia East, Lannanta ha Porthreptor) is an electoral division of Cornwall in the United Kingdom which returns one member to sit on Cornwall Council. It was created at the 2021 local elections, being formed from Lelant and Carbis Bay and parts of the former divisions of St Ives East and Ludgvan. The current councillor is Luke Rogers, a Liberal Democrat.

== Extent ==
St Ives East, Lelant and Carbis Bay covers part of the town of St Ives (including Tregenna Castle) as well as Carbis Bay, Lelant, Lelant Downs and Cockwells.

The division originally included Nancledra and part of Cripplesease, but these areas were moved to be part of St Ives West and Towednack by the Cornwall (Electoral Changes) Order 2021 when they became part of the parish of Towednack.

== Election results ==
=== 2021 election ===
2021 election: St Ives East, Lelant and Carbis Bay
Party	Candidate	Votes	%	±%
Conservative	Linda Taylor (Note: Incumbent councillor, formerly representing Lelant and Carbis Bay)	1,047	46.1	
Liberal Democrats	Luke Rogers	793	34.9	
Green	Ian Arthur	219	9.6	
Labour	Steve Hynes	200	8.8	
Majority		254	11.2	
Rejected ballots		13	0.6	
Turnout		2,272	46.4	
Registered electors		4,892		
Conservative win (new seat)				

=== 2025 election ===
2025 election: St Ives East, Lelant and Carbis Bay
Party	Candidate	Votes	%	±%
Liberal Democrats	Luke Rogers	901	39.9	+5.0
Independent	Johnnie Wells	581	25.7	New
Reform	Alison Groves	536	23.7	New
Conservative	Claire Hiscott	237	10.5	−35.6
Majority		320	14.2	+3.0
Rejected ballots		2	0.1	-0.5
Turnout		2,257	44.9	+1.5
Registered electors		5,025		
Liberal Democrats gain from Conservative				
