= Gwinear-Gwithian and St Erth (electoral division) =

Former electoral division of Cornwall in the UK

- Former ward Cornwall Council
- Boundary of Gwinear-Gwithian and St Erth in Cornwall from 2013-2021.
- County: Cornwall

2013–2021
- Number of councillors: One
- Replaced by: Gwinear-Gwithian and Hayle East; Long Rock, Marazion and St Erth
- Created from: Gwinear-Gwithian and St Erth

2009–2013
- Number of councillors: One
- Replaced by: Gwinear-Gwithian and St Erth
- Created from: Council created

Gwinear-Gwithian and St Erth (Cornish: Gwynnyer, Sen Godhyan ha Lannudhno) was an electoral division of Cornwall in the United Kingdom which returned one member to sit on Cornwall Council between 2009 and 2021. It was abolished at the 2021 local elections, being succeeded by Gwinear-Gwithian and Hayle East and Long Rock, Marazion and St Erth.

== Councillors ==
Election	Member	Party
2009	Ray Tovey	Conservative
2013	Lionel Pascoe	Conservative
2017	Lionel Pascoe	Conservative
2021	Seat abolished	

== Extent ==
Gwinear-Gwithian and St Erth represented the town of St Erth, the villages of Fraddam, Gwithian, Connor Downs and Gwinear, and the hamlets of St Erth Praze, Reawla, Wall, Carnhell Green, Upton Towans and Calloose. It also covered the area of Godrevy (including, nominally, Godrevy Lighthouse), parts of the hamlets of Rose-an-Grouse and Canon's Town (both shared with Ludgvan division), the village of Leedstown (shared with Crowan and Wendron division), and most of the hamlet of Roseworthy (shared with Camborne Treswithian and, to a lesser extent, Camborne Pendarves).

The division was nominally abolished during boundary changes at the 2013 election, but this had little effect on the ward. From 2009 to 2013, the division covered 4407 hectares in total; after the boundary changes in 2013, it covered 4405 hectares.

== Election results ==
=== 2017 election ===
2017 election: Gwinear-Gwithian and St Erth
Party	Candidate	Votes	%	±%
Conservative	Lionel Pascoe	690	45.8	▲19.5
Independent	Angelo Spencer-Smith	396	26.3	▲8.4
Independent	Michael Smith	245	16.3	New
Liberal Democrats	Frank Blewett	171	11.3	▲6.9
Majority		294	19.5	▲12.0
Rejected ballots		5	0.3	▼0.1
Turnout		1507	40.1	▲2.8
Conservative hold		Swing		

=== 2013 election ===
2013 election: Gwinear-Gwithian and St Erth
Party	Candidate	Votes	%	±%
Conservative	Lionel Pascoe	414	30.0	▼7.9
UKIP	Peter Channon	311	22.5	New
Independent	Angelo Spencer-Smith	248	17.9	New
Independent	Michael Roberts	183	13.2	New
Labour	Michael Smith	118	8.5	▲2.9
Liberal Democrats	Yvonne Bates	61	4.4	▼17.7
Green	Theresa Byrne	42	3.0	New
Majority		103	7.5	▲3.5
Rejected ballots		5	0.4	▼0.1
Turnout		1382	37.3	▼7.3
Conservative hold		Swing		

=== 2009 election ===
2009 election: Gwinear-Gwithian and St Erth
Party	Candidate	Votes	%	±%
Conservative	Ray Tovey	612	37.9	
Independent	Sheila Furneaux	547	33.9	
Liberal Democrats	Steve Leverton	356	22.1	
Labour	David Hughes	90	5.6	
Majority		65	4.0	
Rejected ballots		8	0.5	
Turnout		1613	44.6	
Conservative win (new seat)				
