= Robert Trewhella =

British railway engineer (1830–1909)

- Born: Ludgvan, Cornwall, England
- Baptised: 30 May 1830
- Died: 6 February 1909; Catania, Sicily, Italy
- Occupation: Civil engineer
- Spouse: Kate Lucy Thrupp (m. 1862)
- Children: 4

Robert Trewhella (1830 – 6 February 1909) was a railway engineer.

== Origins ==
Robert Trewhella II was born in Cornwall, in the parish of Ludgvan (3 miles north-east of Penzance) and was christened there on 30 May 1830. He was a son of Robert Trewheela I (1792/6-1846) of Cockwells in the parish of Ludgvan, a miner and farmer, by his first wife Mary Repper (d.1831), whom he married in 1815 at Ludgvan.

Little is recorded regarding the history of the Trewhella family. The historic estate of "Trewhella" (today "Trewhella Farm") is situated in the parish of St Hilary, 3 miles east of Ludgvan, in an area containing many former mines, most notably Wheal Fortune. A certain James Trewhella, in 1633 a churchwarden of Towednack, the parish on the east side of Ludgvan, is represented as one of two profile busts sculpted on surviving wooden bench ends in that church. It has been proposed that his son was Matthew Trewhella, a choirboy with a beautiful voice who in the legend of the Mermaid of Zennor, (recorded in 1873 by William Bottrell (1816-1881) in his Traditions and Hearthside Stories of West Cornwall) was abducted from the parish of Zennor (adjacent to both Ludgvan and Towednack) into the sea by a mermaid, which legendary creature is sculpted on the surviving Mermaid Chair in St Senara's Church, Zennor, constructed from two 15th-century bench ends.

== Career ==
He studied civil engineering and worked with the famous engineer Isambard Kingdom Brunel. Between 1850 and 1860, Trewhella was invited by the Italian government to participate in the construction of the infrastructure of the country. He moved to Italy, designing and building railways, roads and bridges, including the seventy-mile line between Florence and Bologna through the rugged Apennine Mountains. He built various narrow-gauge railways in Sicily, including the Circumetnea line around Mount Etna, and the Palermo–Corleone line. He acquired land and sulphur mines, and built the first great hotel in Palermo, the Excelsior, where, in 1903 he received King Edward VII and Queen Alexandra as his guests. He is associated in some manner with the Palazzo Trewhella, 91-103 Via Garibaldi, on the south side of that street, west of the junction with Via Santa Chiara, Catania, a large 18th-century apartment block surrounding a central courtyard.

== Builds Villa Sant'Andrea ==
He built the Villa Sant'Andrea on the beach in the Bay of Mazzarò below Taormina, Sicily, as his summer house. In 1919 the villa was completed by his son Percy Trewhella, whose daughter Gwendoline Trewhella (born in nearby Catania) and her husband Major Ivor Manley transformed it in 1950 into the present well-known hotel. Ivor Manley was attached as an intelligence corps officer to the US 5th Army during the 1943 Allied invasion which recaptured Sicily and Italy from German occupation, and he personally recovered possession of Villa Sant'Andrea which had been used as an officer's mess for the staff of Field Marshal Albert Kesselring whose HQ was at the Hotel San Domenico in Taormina.

== Marriage and issue ==
On 2 January 1862 at Leghorn in Italy, he married Kate Lucy Thrupp, an Englishwoman whom he met in Sicily. His brother John Trewhella (1816-1878) "of Penzance", Cornwall, also a railway engineer, married her sister Anna Maria Thrupp and died at Sorrento, Italy. By his wife he had issue including:

- Charles Robert Trewhella (1865-1893), born in Florence 14 March 1865, educated at Clifton College in Bristol, a member of the Institute of Civil Engineers, who died at Rome on 8 March 1893, aged 28, where he was buried in the Protestant Cemetery. His obituary published by the Institution of Civil Engineers states as follows:

In 1882 he became a student at the Royal Indian Engineering College, Coopers Hill, where he took 1st-class honours and obtained the diploma of Associate. On leaving the College in 1885, he was engaged under his father on railway and mining works in Sicily and Italy. In March, 1886, he was employed on a project for a railway round Mount Etna about 65 miles in length and in the following June was sent to Palermo to superintend the completion of the Palermo-Corleone Railway, about 40 miles in length. In January, 1887, he returned to Catania and took charge of the construction of a short line from Raddusa to the Sant' Agostino Sulphur Mines and was subsequently engaged in superintending the plant for the Stretto Sulphur Mine. In 1890 and 1891 he was occupied on the construction of the Ferrovia-circum-Etna - the railway round Mount Etna - and also in designing the plant for the Grotta Calda Sulphur Mines in Sicily, of which he was a joint lessee. He was elected an Associate Member of the Institution on the 3rd of January, 1891.

- (Alfred) Percy Trewhella (24 April 1875 - 5 April 1959), born 24 April 1875 in Castellamare di Stabia, Naples, Italy, married Gertrude Deidamia Sarauw (11 July 1880 - 5 April 1959), born in Messina, Sicily, the daughter of Carl Christian 'Carlo' Sarauw. The journal of Mrs Gertrude Trewhella's internment in occupied France during WW II was published in 2014, edited by her grandson's wife Jane Manley. The couple died together in tragic circumstances at Taormina when Gertrude "stepped out of the way of a car in the road outside the villa gates and fell. As she did so, her husband Percy tried to catch hold of her and, tragically, the two of them fell to their deaths". By his wife he had a son and two daughters:
  - Gerald Trewhella (1908-28 December 1908), born in Catania, died in infancy during the 1908 Messina earthquake, the most destructive earthquake ever experienced in Europe which killed 100,000 people.
  - Gwendoline Deidamia Trewhella (1910-1998), born in Catania, who in 1936 at Taormina married Major (William Arthur Reginald) Ivor Manley (1912-1973) of Bacton Grange, in Herefordshire's Golden Valley, of the Welsh Guards and later of the British Intelligence Corps, in 1946 British Vice-Consul at Naples; Her son Richard ("Dickie") Ivor Trewhella Manley (born 1939) took over the hotel in 1965, which he managed together with his wife (Priscilla) Jane Allin (a great-granddaughter of Colonel Robert Bridges Bellers, JP, DL, of Bacton Manor) until 1985 when the family, with four children, returned permanently to England.
  - (Vittoria) Vivien Trewhella (1914-1991), born in Catania on 9 March 1914, wife of Sir John Norris Nicholson, 2nd Baronet of Brooke House, Parkgate, Cheshire and of Mottistone Manor, Isle of Wight, Lord Lieutenant of the Isle of Wight 1980-6, Chairman of the Ocean Steam Ship Company 1957-71, Chairman of Martins Bank 1962-4 and a director of Barclays Bank 1969-81.
- Beatrice Elford, daughter, mentioned in her father's will, dated 11 July 1908 at Palermo
- Adele Carnazzo, daughter, mentioned in her father's will.

== Death and burial ==
He died at 19 Viale Margherita, his mansion in Catania, Sicily, on 6 February 1909 and was buried in the Protestant Cemetery, Rome.
