= List of United Kingdom locations: Lel-Lez =

The United Kingdom

This is part of the list of United Kingdom locations: a gazetteer of place names in the United Kingdom showing each place's locality and geographical coordinates.

== Le (continued) ==
=== Lel-Lez ===
Location	Locality	Coordinates (links to map & photo sources)	OS grid reference
Lelant	Cornwall	50.18°N 05.44°W	SW5437
Lelant Downs	Cornwall	50.17°N 05.47°W	SW5236
Lelley	East Riding of Yorkshire	53.77°N 00.18°W	TA2032
Lem Hill	Worcestershire	52.36°N 02.41°W	SO7274
Lemington	Newcastle upon Tyne	54.97°N 01.73°W	NZ1764
Lempitlaw	Scottish Borders	55.58°N 02.35°W	NT7832
Lemsford	Hertfordshire	51.78°N 00.24°W	TL2111
Lenacre	Cumbria	54.29°N 02.52°W	SD6689
Lenborough	Buckinghamshire	51.97°N 00.99°W	SP6931
Lenchwick	Worcestershire	52.12°N 01.95°W	SP0347
Lendalfoot	South Ayrshire	55.16°N 04.93°W	NX1389
Lenham	Kent	51.23°N 00.70°E	TQ8952
Lenham Forstal	Kent	51.21°N 00.73°E	TQ9150
Lenham Heath	Kent	51.20°N 00.73°E	TQ9149
Lennel	Northumberland	55.65°N 02.23°W	NT8540
Lennoxtown	East Dunbartonshire	55.96°N 04.21°W	NS6277
Lent	Buckinghamshire	51.52°N 00.67°W	SU9282
Lenten Pool	Denbighshire	53.18°N 03.43°W	SJ0466
Lenton	Lincolnshire	52.85°N 00.48°W	TF0230
Lenton	Nottinghamshire	52.94°N 01.18°W	SK5539
Lenton Abbey	Nottinghamshire	52.93°N 01.21°W	SK5338
Lentran	Highland	57.47°N 04.36°W	NH5845
Lent Rise	Buckinghamshire	51.52°N 00.67°W	SU9281
Lenwade	Norfolk	52.71°N 01.10°E	TG1018
Lenzie	East Dunbartonshire	55.92°N 04.16°W	NS6572
Lenziemill	North Lanarkshire	55.93°N 03.98°W	NS7673
Leoch	Angus	56.51°N 03.05°W	NO3536
Leochel-Cushnie	Aberdeenshire	57.17°N 02.79°W	NJ5210
Leominster	Herefordshire	52.22°N 02.74°W	SO4959
Leonard Stanley	Gloucestershire	51.72°N 02.29°W	SO8003
Leonardston	Pembrokeshire	51.70°N 04.98°W	SM9405
Leorin	Argyll and Bute	55.65°N 06.21°W	NR3548
Lepe	Hampshire	50.77°N 01.36°W	SZ4598
Lephin	Highland	57.44°N 06.71°W	NG1749
Lephinchapel	Argyll and Bute	56.05°N 05.27°W	NR9690
Lephinmore	Argyll and Bute	56.07°N 05.24°W	NR9892
Leppington	North Yorkshire	54.03°N 00.84°W	SE7661
Lepton	Kirklees	53.63°N 01.69°W	SE2015
Lepton Edge	Kirklees	53.63°N 01.68°W	SE2115
Lerryn	Cornwall	50.37°N 04.61°W	SX1456
Lerwick	Shetland Islands	60.15°N 01.15°W	HU4741
Lesbury	Northumberland	55.39°N 01.63°W	NU2311
Leslie	Aberdeenshire	57.30°N 02.68°W	NJ5924
Leslie	Fife	56.19°N 03.22°W	NO2401
Lesmahagow	South Lanarkshire	55.63°N 03.89°W	NS8139
Lesnewth	Cornwall	50.67°N 04.64°W	SX1390
Lessingham	Norfolk	52.79°N 01.54°E	TG3928
Lessness Heath	Bexley	51.48°N 00.14°E	TQ4978
Lessonhall	Cumbria	54.83°N 03.21°W	NY2250
Leswalt	Dumfries and Galloway	54.92°N 05.10°W	NX0163
Letchmore Heath	Hertfordshire	51.66°N 00.33°W	TQ1597
Letchworth	Hertfordshire	51.97°N 00.23°W	TL2132
Letcombe Bassett	Oxfordshire	51.56°N 01.46°W	SU3785
Letcombe Regis	Oxfordshire	51.57°N 01.45°W	SU3886
Letham	Angus	56.62°N 02.78°W	NO5248
Letham	Falkirk	56.04°N 03.78°W	NS8985
Letham	Fife	56.31°N 03.13°W	NO3014
Letham	Perth and Kinross	56.40°N 03.47°W	NO0924
Lethem	Scottish Borders	55.36°N 02.52°W	NT6708
Lethenty	Aberdeenshire	57.45°N 02.33°W	NJ8041
Letheringham	Suffolk	52.16°N 01.31°E	TM2757
Letheringsett	Norfolk	52.90°N 01.06°E	TG0638
Lettaford	Devon	50.64°N 03.84°W	SX7084
Lettan	Orkney Islands	59.29°N 02.44°W	HY7545
Letter	Aberdeenshire	57.18°N 02.41°W	NJ7511
Letterewe	Highland	57.68°N 05.44°W	NG9571
Letterfearn	Highland	57.24°N 05.51°W	NG8823
Lettermorar	Highland	56.93°N 05.73°W	NM7389
Letters	Highland	57.83°N 05.10°W	NH1687
Letterston	Pembrokeshire	51.92°N 05.01°W	SM9329
Letton (North Herefordshire)	Herefordshire	52.32°N 02.92°W	SO3770
Letton (Central Herefordshire)	Herefordshire	52.10°N 02.97°W	SO3346
Letton Green	Norfolk	52.61°N 00.92°E	TF9806
Lett's Green	Bromley	51.31°N 00.07°E	TQ4559
Lletty Brongu	Bridgend	51.57°N 03.61°W	SS8888
Letty Green	Hertfordshire	51.77°N 00.14°W	TL2810
Letwell	Rotherham	53.37°N 01.15°W	SK5687
Leuchars	Fife	56.37°N 02.89°W	NO4521
Leumrabhagh	Western Isles	58.01°N 06.45°W	NB3711
Levalsa Meor	Cornwall	50.30°N 04.81°W	SX0049
Levan	Inverclyde	55.94°N 04.86°W	NS2176
Levaneap	Shetland Islands	60.34°N 01.13°W	HU4863
Levedale	Staffordshire	52.74°N 02.16°W	SJ8916
Level of Mendalgief	City of Newport	51.56°N 03.01°W	ST3086
Level's Green	Essex	51.89°N 00.13°E	TL4724
Leven	East Riding of Yorkshire	53.88°N 00.32°W	TA1045
Leven	Fife	56.18°N 03.00°W	NO3800
Levencorroch	North Ayrshire	55.44°N 05.16°W	NS0021
Levenhall	East Lothian	55.94°N 03.02°W	NT3673
Levenish	Western Isles	57.79°N 08.51°W	NF133966
Leven Links	Fife	56.18°N 03.00°W	NO3800
Levens	Cumbria	54.26°N 02.79°W	SD4886
Leven Seat	West Lothian	55.81°N 03.69°W	NS9459
Levens Green	Hertfordshire	51.88°N 00.03°W	TL3522
Levenshulme	Manchester	53.44°N 02.19°W	SJ8794
Leaventhorpe	Bradford	53.79°N 01.81°W	SE1233
Levenwick	Shetland Islands	59.97°N 01.28°W	HU4021
Leverburgh	Western Isles	57.76°N 07.03°W	NG0186
Lever Edge	Bolton	53.55°N 02.45°W	SD7006
Leverington	Cambridgeshire	52.67°N 00.12°E	TF4411
Leverington Common	Cambridgeshire	52.66°N 00.09°E	TF4210
Leverstock Green	Hertfordshire	51.74°N 00.43°W	TL0806
Leverton	Berkshire	51.42°N 01.52°W	SU3370
Leverton	Lincolnshire	53.00°N 00.07°E	TF3947
Leverton Highgate	Lincolnshire	53.00°N 00.08°E	TF4047
Leverton Lucasgate	Lincolnshire	53.00°N 00.09°E	TF4147
Leverton Outgate	Lincolnshire	53.01°N 00.11°E	TF4248
Levington	Suffolk	52.00°N 01.24°E	TM2339
Levisham	North Yorkshire	54.29°N 00.72°W	SE8390
Lew	Oxfordshire	51.75°N 01.53°W	SP3206
Lewannick	Cornwall	50.59°N 04.44°W	SX2780
Lewcombe	Dorset	50.86°N 02.64°W	ST5507
Lewdown	Devon	50.65°N 04.20°W	SX4486
Lewes	East Sussex	50.87°N -00.00°E	TQ4110
Leweston	Pembrokeshire	51.85°N 04.99°W	SM9422
Lewisham	London Borough of Lewisham	51.45°N 00.01°W	TQ3875
Lewiston	Highland	57.31°N 04.49°W	NH5028
Lewistown	Bridgend	51.58°N 03.54°W	SS9388
Lewknor	Oxfordshire	51.66°N 00.97°W	SU7197
Lewson Street	Kent	51.31°N 00.81°E	TQ9661
Lewth	Lancashire	53.81°N 02.79°W	SD4836
Lewthorn Cross	Devon	50.57°N 03.73°W	SX7776
Lewtrenchard	Devon	50.65°N 04.19°W	SX4586
Lexden	Essex	51.88°N 00.86°E	TL9725
Ley	Somerset	51.12°N 03.65°W	SS8438
Leybourne	Kent	51.29°N 00.40°E	TQ6858
Leyburn	North Yorkshire	54.30°N 01.83°W	SE1190
Leycett	Staffordshire	53.01°N 02.31°W	SJ7946
Leyfields	Staffordshire	52.64°N 01.72°W	SK1905
Ley Green	Hertfordshire	51.90°N 00.32°W	TL1524
Ley Hey Park	Stockport	53.39°N 02.07°W	SJ9589
Leyhill	South Gloucestershire	51.62°N 02.44°W	ST6992
Ley Hill	Birmingham	52.58°N 01.83°W	SP1198
Ley Hill	Buckinghamshire	51.70°N 00.58°W	SP9802
Leyland	Lancashire	53.69°N 02.69°W	SD5422
Leylodge	Aberdeenshire	57.20°N 02.39°W	NJ7613
Leymoor	Kirklees	53.64°N 01.85°W	SE1016
Leys	Cumbria	54.54°N 03.45°W	NY0618
Leys	Staffordshire	53.02°N 01.95°W	SK0347
Leysdown-on-Sea	Kent	51.39°N 00.91°E	TR0370
Leys Hill	Herefordshire	51.86°N 02.61°W	SO5819
Leysmill	Angus	56.61°N 02.65°W	NO6047
Leysters	Herefordshire	52.26°N 02.64°W	SO5663
Leyton	Waltham Forest	51.55°N 00.02°W	TQ3786
Leyton Cross	Kent	51.43°N 00.187°W	TQ521726
Leytonstone	Waltham Forest	51.56°N -00.00°E	TQ3987
Lezant	Cornwall	50.58°N 04.36°W	SX3379
Lezerea	Cornwall	50.15°N 05.24°W	SW6833
Leziate	Norfolk	52.74°N 00.47°E	TF6719
