= Praze =

Praze may refer to:

- Praze-An-Beeble, a village in Cornwall, United Kingdom
- St Erth Praze, a hamlet in Cornwall, United Kingdom
- Prague, the capital of the Czech Republic
