= Amalebra =

Hamlet in Cornwall, England

Coordinates: 50.17°N 05.51°W

Amalebra: Cornish: Amallebri
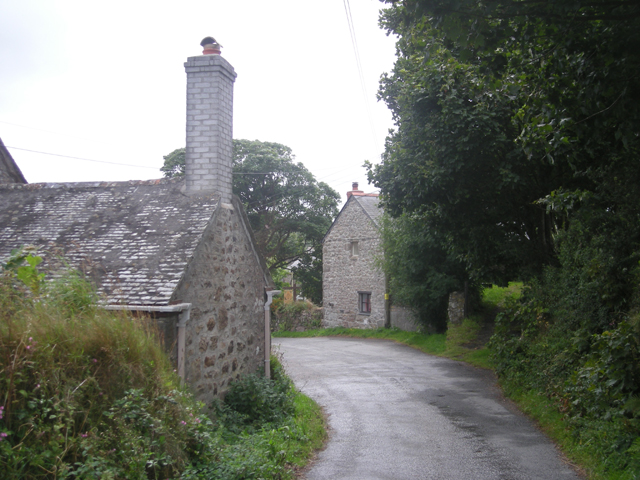
- Amalebra

- Location within Cornwall
- OS grid reference: SW 495 365
- Shire county: Cornwall
- Region: South West
- Country: England
- Sovereign state: United Kingdom
- Post town: Penzance
- Postcode district: TR20
- Police: Devon and Cornwall
- Fire: Cornwall
- Ambulance: South Western

Amalebra (Cornish: Amallebri) is a hamlet in Cornwall, United Kingdom, 3 miles (4.8 kilometres) south-west of St Ives at Ordnance Survey grid reference SW 495 365. According to the Post Office the 2011 census population was included in the civil parish of Towednack.
