= St Ives South =

Former electoral division of Cornwall in the UK

- Former ward Cornwall Council
- County: Cornwall

2009–2013
- Number of councillors: One
- Replaced by: St Ives West; St Ives East
- Created from: Council created

St Ives South (Cornish: Porthia Soth) was an electoral division of Cornwall in the United Kingdom which returned one member to sit on Cornwall Council from 2009 to 2013. The sole Councillor was Joan Symons, a Conservative.

The division covered 1,576 hectares in total. It was abolished by the Cornwall (Electoral Changes) Order 2011, and Symons went on to contest the St Ives East division. She lost re-election, being beaten by the Green Party candidate.

== Election results ==
=== 2009 election ===
2009 election: St Ives South
| Party | Candidate | Votes | % | ±% |
|---|---|---|---|---|
| Conservative | Joan Symons | 536 | 41.6 | |
| Green | Ron Tulley | 336 | 26.1 | |
| Liberal Democrats | Richard Ryan | 183 | 14.2 | |
| UKIP | Paul Jackson | 147 | 11.4 | |
| Labour | Timothy Pullen | 75 | 5.8 | |
| Majority | | 200 | 15.5 | |
| Rejected ballots | | 10 | 0.8 | |
| Turnout | | 1287 | 41.1 | |
| Conservative win (new seat) | | | | |
