= Perran Downs =

Hamlet in Cornwall, England

Coordinates: 50.123°N 5.424°W

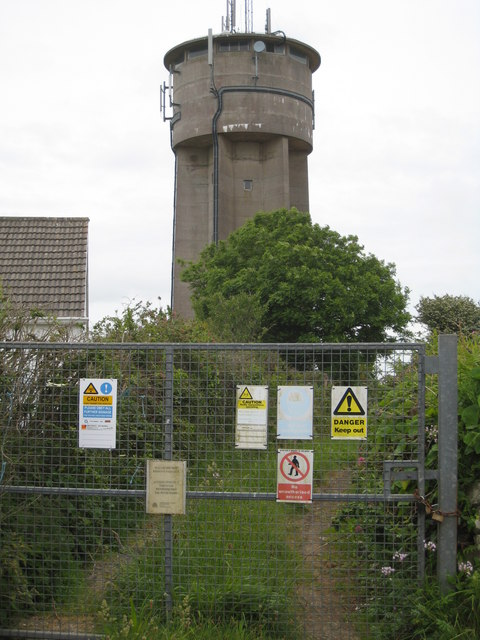
- Water tower on Perran Downs

- Location within Cornwall
- OS grid reference: SW553304
- Unitary authority: Cornwall
- Ceremonial county: Cornwall
- Region: South West
- Country: England
- Sovereign state: United Kingdom

Perran Downs is a hamlet near Perranuthnoe, Goldsithney and St Hilary in Cornwall, England. It is close by to the 13th-century St Hilary Church.

Perran Downs lies in Penwith district (Cornwall and Isles of Scilly), and has a population of 1,577. A significant amount of semi-natural habitat of broad-leaved woodland can be found within and around Perran Downs. There are also some very small, isolated areas of coniferous woodland. An area of outstanding natural beauty, the landscape type is predominantly Grade 3 agricultural land of largely mixed farming with improved grassland as pasture for horses. Nearest large towns are Penzance, Hayle and Helston.
