= Varfell =

Hamlet in Cornwall, England

Coordinates: 50°08′18″N 5°29′34″W

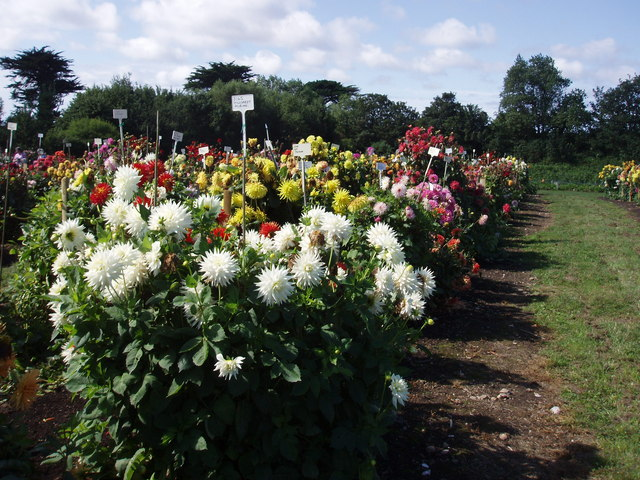
The National Collection of Dahlias at Varfell

Varfell is a hamlet within the parish of Ludgvan, Cornwall, UK. Varfell Farm is the world's largest producers of daffodil bulbs.

== History ==
In 1882 the Penzance Rural Sanitary Authority agreed to supply Mr Lawry 500 imperial gallons (2,300 L; 600 US gal) daily for the greenhouses, on the condition that if there was a shortage the supply would be diverted to Marazion and St Michael's Mount. The annual rate of payment was £6. Varfell is now one the centres of production for the large flower and bulb growers Winchester Bulbs.

== Famous people ==
Varfell was the ancestral home of the chemist Humphry Davy.
