= Rose-an-Grouse =

Hamlet in Cornwall, England

Coordinates: 50°10′15″N 5°26′43″W

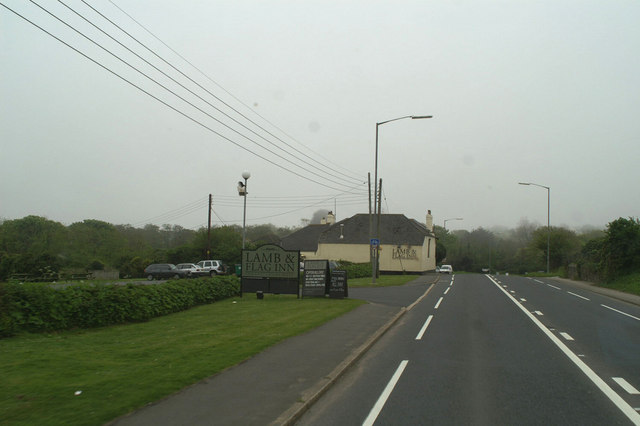
The Lamb and Flag at Rose-an-Grouse

Rose-an-Grouse (Cornish: Res an Grows, meaning "ford of the cross") is a hamlet in the civil parish of St Erth in west Cornwall, England. It is on the A30 road, east of Canon's Town, and St Erth railway station is on the southern side of the hamlet.

== Toponymy ==
In 1375 it was recorded as Resincrous which means "ford of the cross" in Cornish. Other spellings since then include Reysangrous (1520), Roseangrowes (1659), Roseangrowse (1725) and Rosangrows (1755). In 1882 the parish of Ludgvan was served a Bill of Indictment for the non-repair of the highway between Long Rock and Rous-an-Crous.
