= St Ives East (electoral division) =

Former electoral division of Cornwall in the UK

- Former ward Cornwall Council
- Boundary of St Ives East in from 2013-2021.
- County: Cornwall

2013–2021
- Number of councillors: One
- Replaced by: St Ives West and Towednack; St Ives East, Lelant and Carbis Bay
- Created from: St Ives North; St Ives South

St Ives East (Cornish: Porthia Est) was an electoral division of Cornwall in the United Kingdom which returned one member to sit on Cornwall Council from 2013 to 2021. It was abolished at the 2021 local elections, being succeeded by St Ives West and Towednack and St Ives East, Lelant and Carbis Bay.

== Councillors ==
Election	Member	Party
2013	Tim Andrewes	Green
2017	Richard Robinson	Conservative
2021	Seat abolished	

== Extent ==
St Ives East represented the east of St Ives (much of the coastal part of the town) as well as part of the village of Carbis Bay, which is shared with the Lelant and Carbis Bay division. The division covers 292 hectares in total.

== Election results ==
=== 2017 election ===
2017 election: St Ives East
Party	Candidate	Votes	%	±%
Conservative	Richard Robinson	565	41.2	
Green	Tim Andrewes	478	34.9	
Labour	Pedyr Prior	157	11.5	
Liberal Democrats	Caroline White	91	6.6	
UKIP	William Guppy	67	4.9	
Majority		87	6.3	
Rejected ballots		13	0.9	
Turnout		1371	49.7	
Conservative gain from Green		Swing		

=== 2013 election ===
2013 election: St Ives East
Party	Candidate	Votes	%	±%
Green	Tim Andrewes	471	37.0	
Conservative	Joan Symons	339	26.7	
Independent	Morag Robertson	182	14.3	
UKIP	Roy Britton	170	13.4	
Labour	Terry Murray	70	5.5	
Liberal Democrats	Madie Parkinson-Evans	31	2.4	
Majority		132	10.4	
Rejected ballots		9	0.7	
Turnout		1272	41.5	
Green win (new seat)				
