= Rosudgeon =

Hamlet in Cornwall, England

Coordinates: 50°7′N 5°25′W

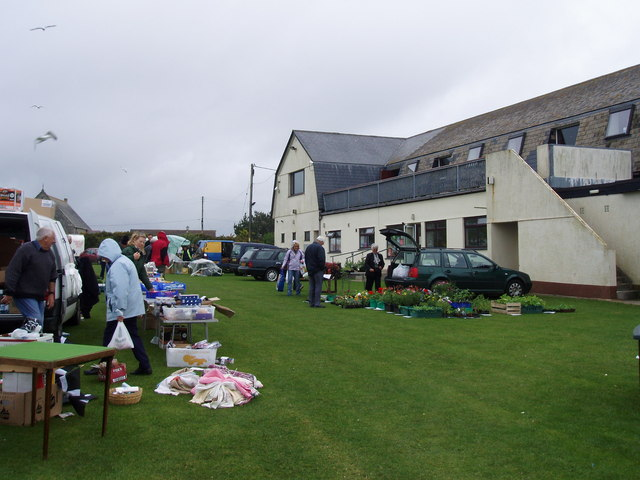
A car boot sale at Rosudgeon Cricket Club

Rosudgeon is a hamlet in the civil parish of Perranuthnoe in west Cornwall, England, United Kingdom, situated on the A394 Penzance to Helston road.
