= Relubbus =

Hamlet in west Cornwall, England

Coordinates: 50°08′09″N 5°24′26″W

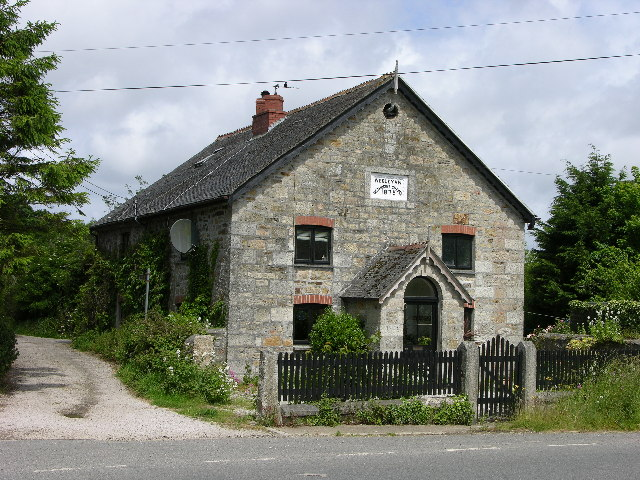
The Wesleyan Methodist Chapel, Relubbus

Relubbus (Cornish: Resloubys) is a hamlet in the parish of St Hilary, west Cornwall, England. It is on the B3280 road between Townshend and Goldsithney; the River Hayle runs through Relubbus.

== History ==
Just to the east is Tregembo Farmhouse, a grade II* listed building dating from the mid-17th century. When offered for sale by auction in April 1880 the Tregembo estate was described as a mansion house, farm house and barton together with over 95 acres (38 ha) of arable land, meadow, plantations and waste-land.

== Mining ==
Relubbus Tin Stream was put up for auction at the Hawkins' Arms, Relubbus on 26 August 1881. The advertisement in The Cornishman newspaper states, that the Tin Stream had been worked successfully for some time by the late Captain Reed of Tregembo. Amongst the equipment for sale was eight water-wheels (five small), 100 ragging self-acting frames, 48 cleaning self-acting frames, a 1,000 feet (300 m) of launders (wooden culverts), etc. The tin stream was auctioned once more on 24 October 1881, this time under the ownership of Edward Mitchell.

East Tregembo mine, halfway between Relubbus and Townsend was explored in 1882 by Grenville Sharp of London and Mark R Chegwin. A rich tin lode was found of about 2.75 feet (0.84 m) wide, worth £30 per fathom and with moderate expenditure the mine was expected to be profitable. At a four-monthly general meeting in July 1883, the accounts showed a debit of £3013 18s 3d. Returns of 50 pounds (23 kg) from 450 tons of ore was said to be better than the Cornish average. There was 2000 tons of ore on the surface waiting to be stamped. The mine was closed on 15 February 1884 following a meeting of the shareholders and auctioned on 30 April 1884. The mine consisted of 60 acres (24 ha) on a 21-year lease from 1880, a 60 inches (1,500 mm) pumping engine, 24 inches (610 mm) engine, pumps, ladders, iron rails and waggon, carpenters shop, 12 tons of black tin, etc.
