= Georgia, Cornwall =

Hamlet in Cornwall, England

Coordinates: 50.173°N 5.525°W

Georgia: Cornish: Gorga
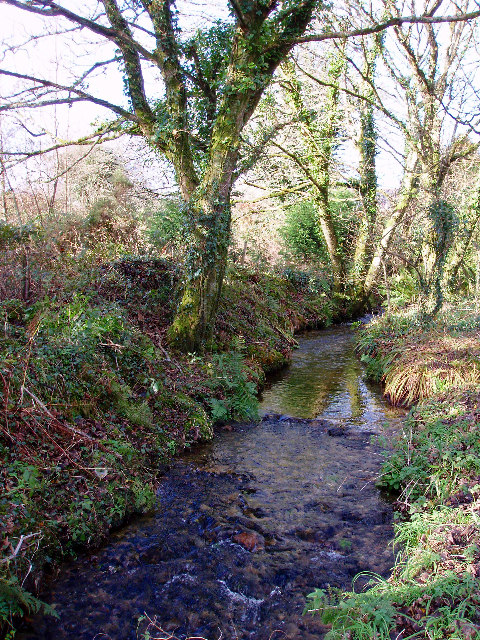
- Stream near Georgia bridge

- Location within Cornwall
- OS grid reference: SW484363
- Unitary authority: Cornwall
- Ceremonial county: Cornwall
- Region: South West
- Country: England
- Sovereign state: United Kingdom
- Post town: St Ives
- Postcode district: TR26
- Dialling code: 01736
- Police: Devon and Cornwall
- Fire: Cornwall
- Ambulance: South Western
- UK Parliament: St Ives

Georgia (Cornish: Gorga, meaning low broken hedge) is a hamlet in the parish of Towednack, Cornwall, England. Georgia is situated 3.5 miles (5.6 km) south-west from St Ives, Cornwall.

Georgia lies within the Cornwall National Landscape (AONB).
