= Lewson Street =

Village in Kent, United Kingdom

Coordinates: 51.316884°N 0.817323°E

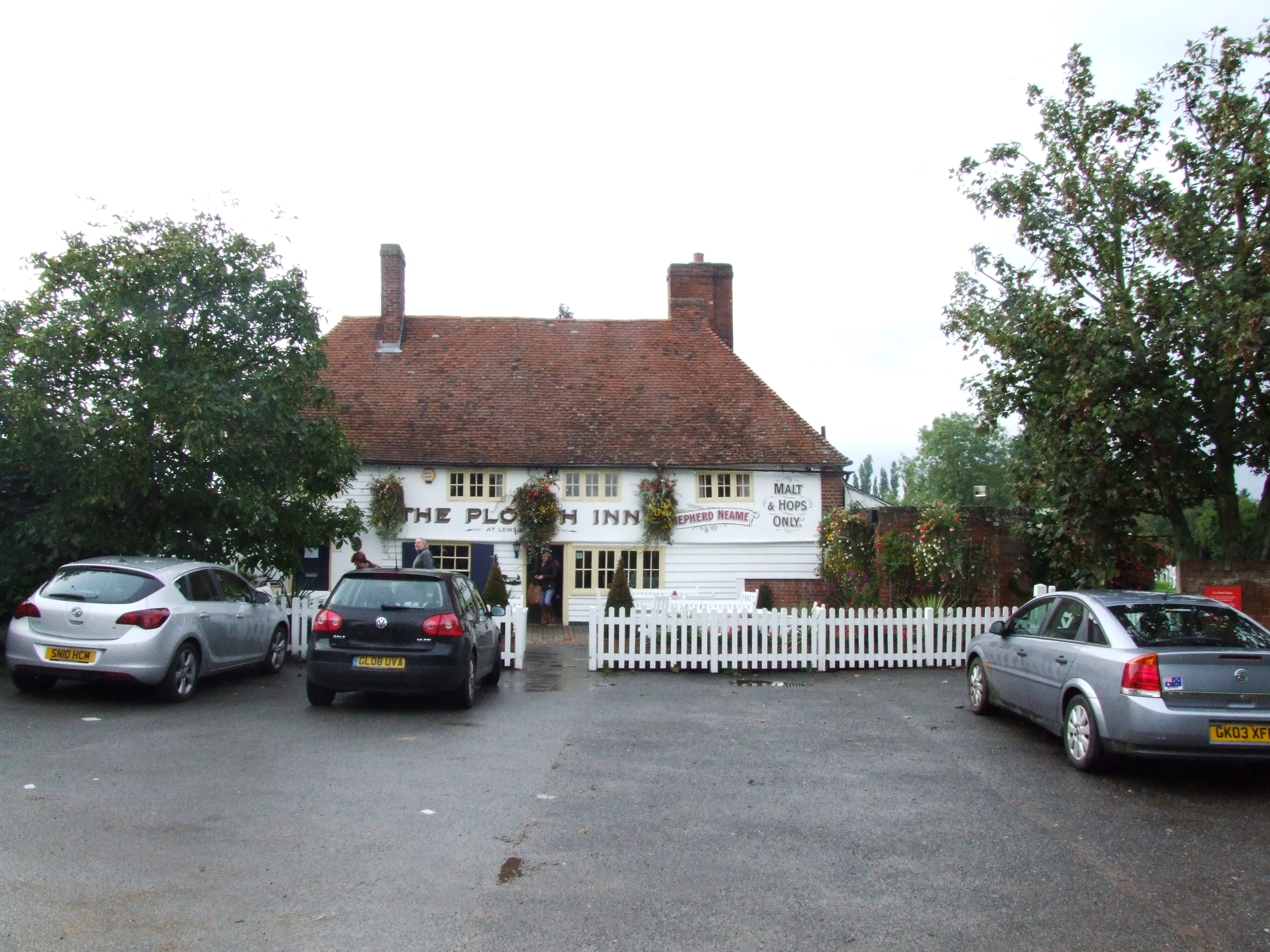
- The Plough

- Location within Kent
- Civil parish: Norton, Buckland and Stone
- District: Swale
- Shire county: Kent
- Region: South East
- Country: England
- Sovereign state: United Kingdom
- Police: Kent
- Fire: Kent
- Ambulance: South East Coast

Lewson Street is a village near the A2 road, in the civil parish of Norton, Buckland and Stone, in the Swale district, in the county of Kent, England. It is near the towns of Sittingbourne and Faversham.
