= Lelant and Carbis Bay (electoral division) =

Former electoral division of Cornwall in the UK

- Former ward Cornwall Council
- Boundary of Lelant and Carbis Bay in Cornwall from 2013-2021.
- County: Cornwall

2013–2021
- Number of councillors: One
- Replaced by: St Ives East, Lelant and Carbis Bay
- Created from: Lelant and Carbis Bay

2009–2013
- Number of councillors: One
- Replaced by: Lelant and Carbis Bay
- Created from: Council created

Lelant and Carbis Bay (Cornish: Lannanta ha Karrbons) was an electoral division of Cornwall in the United Kingdom which returned one member to sit on Cornwall Council between 2009 and 2021. It was abolished at the 2021 local elections, being succeeded by St Ives East, Lelant and Carbis Bay.

== Councillors ==
Election	Member	Party
2009	Liz Penhaligon	Conservative
2013	Liz Penhaligon	Conservative
2017	Linda Taylor	Conservative
2021	Seat abolished	

== Extent ==
The division represented the villages of Carbis Bay, Lelant, Longstone and Trevarrack. The division was nominally abolished during boundary changes at the 2013 election, but this had little effect on the ward. From 2009 to 2013, the division covered 742 hectares in total; after the boundary changes in 2013, it covered 748 hectares.

== Election results ==
=== 2017 election ===
2017 election: Lelant & Carbis Bay
Party	Candidate	Votes	%	±%
Conservative	Linda Taylor	551	41.2	
Independent	Joan Symons	461	34.5	
Independent	Richard Glanville	164	12.3	
Liberal Democrats	Julia Clare Macdonald	155	11.6	
Majority		90	6.7	
Rejected ballots		5	0.4	
Turnout		1,336	43.5	
Conservative hold		Swing		

=== 2013 election ===
2013 election: Lelant & Carbis Bay
Party	Candidate	Votes	%	±%
Conservative	Liz Penhaligon	393	34.5	
UKIP	Sandy Martin	256	22.5	
Green	Maxine Armstrong	156	13.7	
Independent	Richard Glanville	114	10.0	
Liberal Democrats	Howard Hollingsbee	112	9.8	
Labour	Graham Webster	102	9.0	
Majority		137	12.0	
Rejected ballots		5	0.4	
Turnout		1,138	35.8	
Conservative hold		Swing		

=== 2009 election ===
2009 election: Lelant & Carbis Bay
Party	Candidate	Votes	%	±%
Conservative	Liz Penhaligon	704	51.2	
Independent	Graham Webster	386	28.0	
Green	Tracy Stanton	269	19.5	
Majority		318	23.1	
Rejected ballots		17	1.2	
Turnout		1,376	44.7	
Conservative win (new seat)				
