= Nancledra =

Village in west Cornwall, England

Coordinates: 50.1708583°N 5.5077169°W

Nancledra: Cornish: Nanskledri
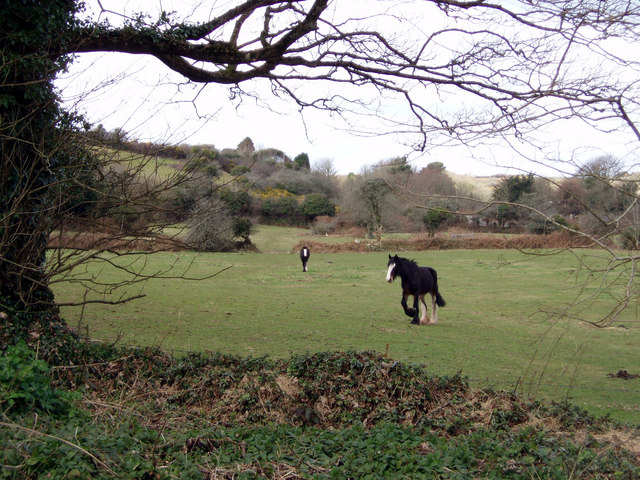
- Pasture land near Nancledra

- Location within Cornwall
- OS grid reference: SW492367
- Civil parish: Towednack
- Unitary authority: Cornwall
- Ceremonial county: Cornwall
- Region: South West
- Country: England
- Sovereign state: United Kingdom

Nancledra or Nancledrea (Cornish: Nanskledri, meaning Kledri's valley) is a village in west Cornwall, England, UK. It is three miles (5 km) south of St Ives and four miles (6.5 km) north-northeast of Penzance. Nancledra is a small village with a population of around 150. The village is in Towednack civil parish in the former mining area of Penwith peninsula.

A pub, The Engine Inn, is situated at Cripplesease just outside the village, but Nancledra has no village shop or Post Office. Nancledra School is situated one mile north of the village on the lane to Towednack at grid reference SW 492 367.

The name of the village probably means valley of Clodri or valley of Cludri.

Robert Morton Nance, one of the chief revivers of the Cornish language, lived in Nancledra.

The local community radio station is Coast FM (formerly Penwith Radio), which broadcasts on 96.5 and 97.2 FM.
