= Amalveor =

Hamlet in Cornwall, England

Coordinates: 50.183°N 05.528°W

Amalveor: Cornish: Amal Veur
- Location within Cornwall
- OS grid reference: SW 482 375
- Shire county: Cornwall
- Region: South West
- Country: England
- Sovereign state: United Kingdom
- Police: Devon and Cornwall
- Fire: Cornwall
- Ambulance: South Western

Amalveor (Cornish: Amal Veur, meaning "great Amal"; 'Amal' appears to be the name of a river) is a hamlet in West Penwith, Cornwall, England, United Kingdom at grid reference SW 482 375. The hamlet is 3 miles (4.8 kilometres) south-west of St Ives. It is in the civil parish of Towednack.

A pair of gold bracelets were discovered at Amalveor Farm (about one mile due west of the church) on 11 December 1931 and were declared to be treasure trove. The bracelets were dated as middle Bronze Age (about 1000BC) and are now in the British Museum. To the west is Sperris Quoit.
