= Crowlas =

Village in Cornwall, England

Coordinates: 50.1465°N 5.4784°W

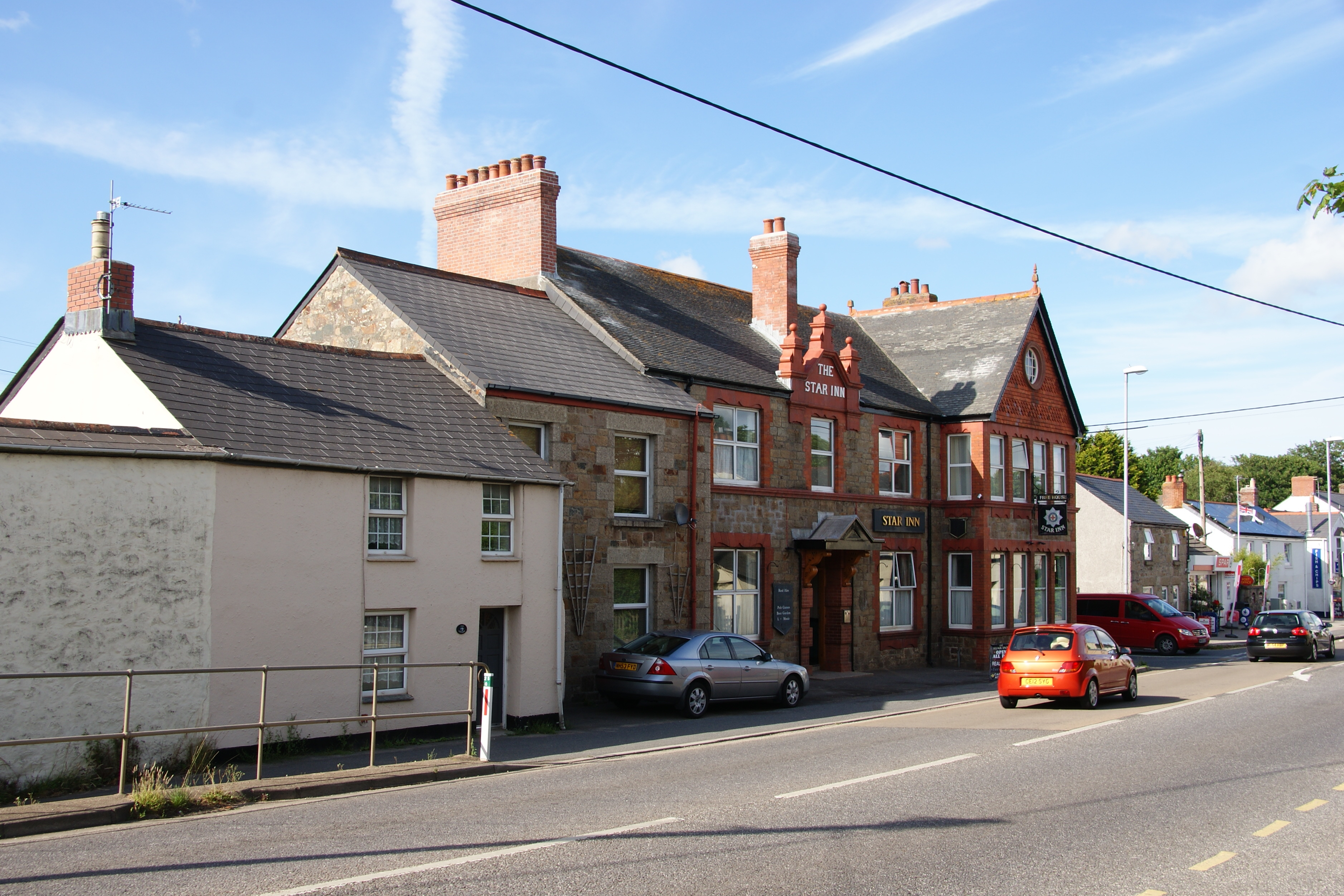
The Star Inn, Crowlas

Crowlas (Cornish: Krewres) is a village in Cornwall, England, on the A30 about three miles east of Penzance. It forms a small conurbation with Ludgvan within the parish of the same name. The hamlet of Whitecross lies to the north. Details of the crosses at Crowlas and Whitecross are included in the article Ludgvan. There are many small businesses. The Methodist Chapel in Chapel square is a modern friendly place that hosts many community activities. The local community radio station Coast FM broadcasts on 96.5 and 97.2 FM.

== Cornish wrestling ==
Cornish wrestling tournaments, for prizes, were held in Crowlas in at least the 1800s and 1900s.
