= Cockwells =

Hamlet in Cornwall, England

Coordinates: 50.156°N 5.472°W

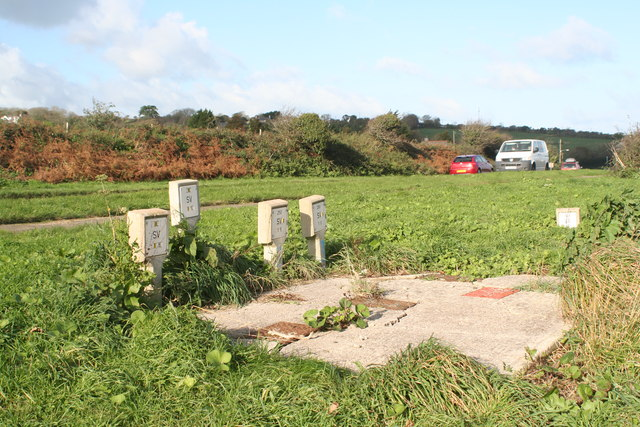
A cluster of stop valve chambers beside the A30 near Cockwells

Cockwells is a hamlet in the civil parish of Ludgvan in Cornwall, England and situated on the A30 road north-east of the village of Crowlas.
