= Gwallon =

Coordinates: 50.135°N 5.465°W

Gwallon: Cornish: Gwallen
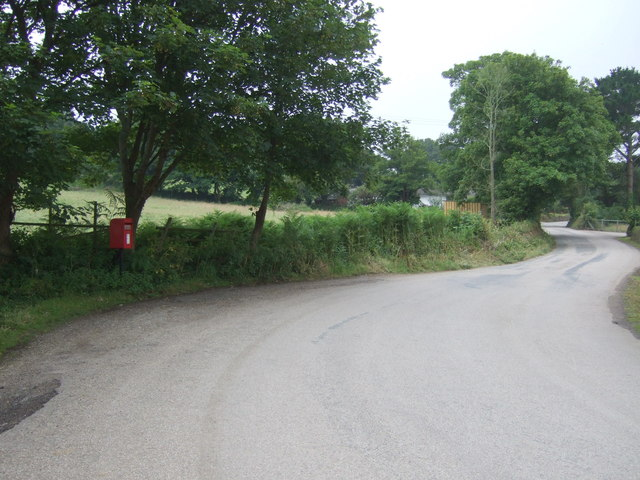

- Location within Cornwall
- OS grid reference: SW525319
- Civil parish: Marazion
- Unitary authority: Cornwall
- Ceremonial county: Cornwall
- Region: South West
- Country: England
- Sovereign state: United Kingdom
- Post town: Marazion
- Postcode district: TR17

Gwallon (Cornish: Gwallen, meaning little wall) is a hamlet in the parish of Marazion, Cornwall, England. It is in the civil parish of St Hilary.
