= Lelant Downs =

Coordinates: 50.1724°N 5.4633°W

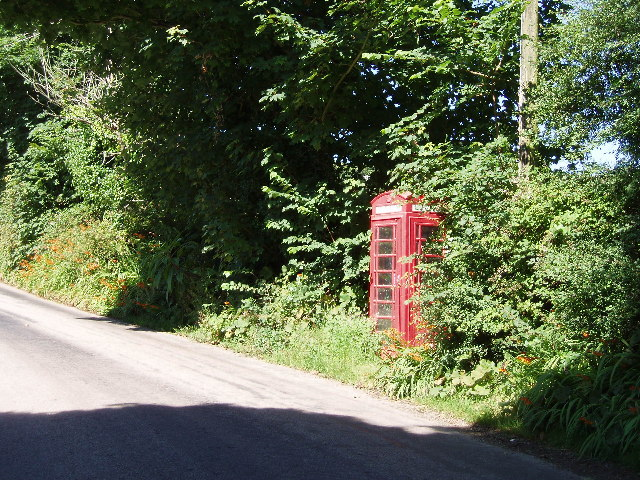
- Telephone box on Lelant Downs

- Location within Cornwall
- OS grid reference: SW528360
- Civil parish: Ludgvan
- Unitary authority: Cornwall
- Ceremonial county: Cornwall
- Region: South West
- Country: England
- Sovereign state: United Kingdom
- Post town: Hayle
- Postcode district: TR27

Lelant Downs is a hamlet in the parish of Ludgvan, Cornwall, England.

== Cornish wrestling ==
Cornish wrestling tournaments have been held in Splattenridden.
