= Halsetown =

Village in Cornwall, England

Coordinates: 50.195°N 5.494°W

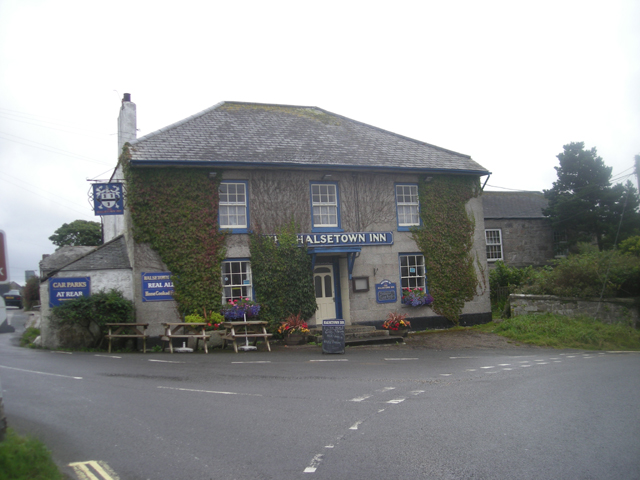
- Halsetown Inn

- Location within Cornwall
- OS grid reference: SW507386
- Civil parish: St Ives
- Unitary authority: Cornwall
- Ceremonial county: Cornwall
- Region: South West
- Country: England
- Sovereign state: United Kingdom
- Post town: St Ives
- Postcode district: TR26

Halsetown is a village near St Ives, Cornwall, England.

The industrial village was planned by the solicitor and politician James Halse and built in the 1830s. There was a tin mine nearby and also a ropewalk. James Halse founded the village in the early 1830s in order to provide housing for his workers, making it one of the earliest planned settlements in England. The village was designed with houses laid out in a grid pattern, with each house having enough attached land – 1/4 acre (0.1 hectares) – to entitle the occupier to vote.

The ecclesiastical parish was created in 1846 and the parish church (1857) was dedicated to St John the Evangelist. A mission chapel was opened on 6 November 1878 because the parish church at St Ives, was too far for parishioners to attend. The village is administered by St Ives Town Council.

== Notable residents ==
The actor Henry Irving was brought up in the village, fostered by his aunt, Mrs Penberthy.
