= Long Rock =

Village in Cornwall, England

Coordinates: 50.12891°N 5.50067°W

Long Rock: Cornish: Carrek Hyr
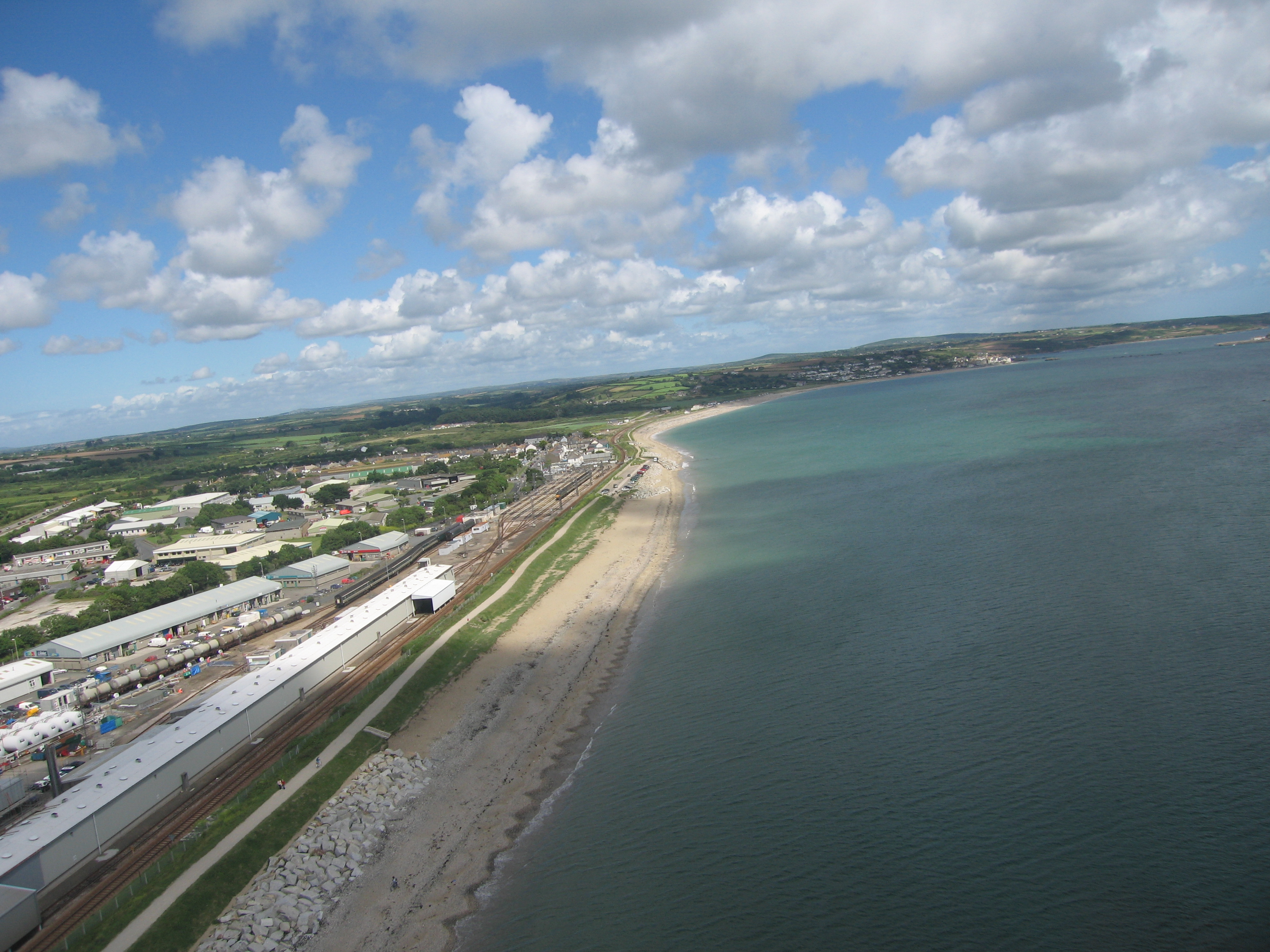
- A view of Long Rock, from a helicopter

- Location within Cornwall
- OS grid reference: SW497315
- Unitary authority: Cornwall Council
- Ceremonial county: Cornwall
- Region: South West
- Country: England
- Sovereign state: United Kingdom
- Post town: PENZANCE
- Postcode district: TR20
- Dialling code: 01736
- Police: Devon and Cornwall
- Fire: Cornwall
- Ambulance: South Western
- UK Parliament: St Ives

Long Rock (Cornish: Carrek Hyr) is a village in west Cornwall, England. It lies approximately 1 mile (1.6 km) east of Penzance and 1 mile (1.6 km) west of Marazion, in the civil parish of Ludgvan.

== Geography ==
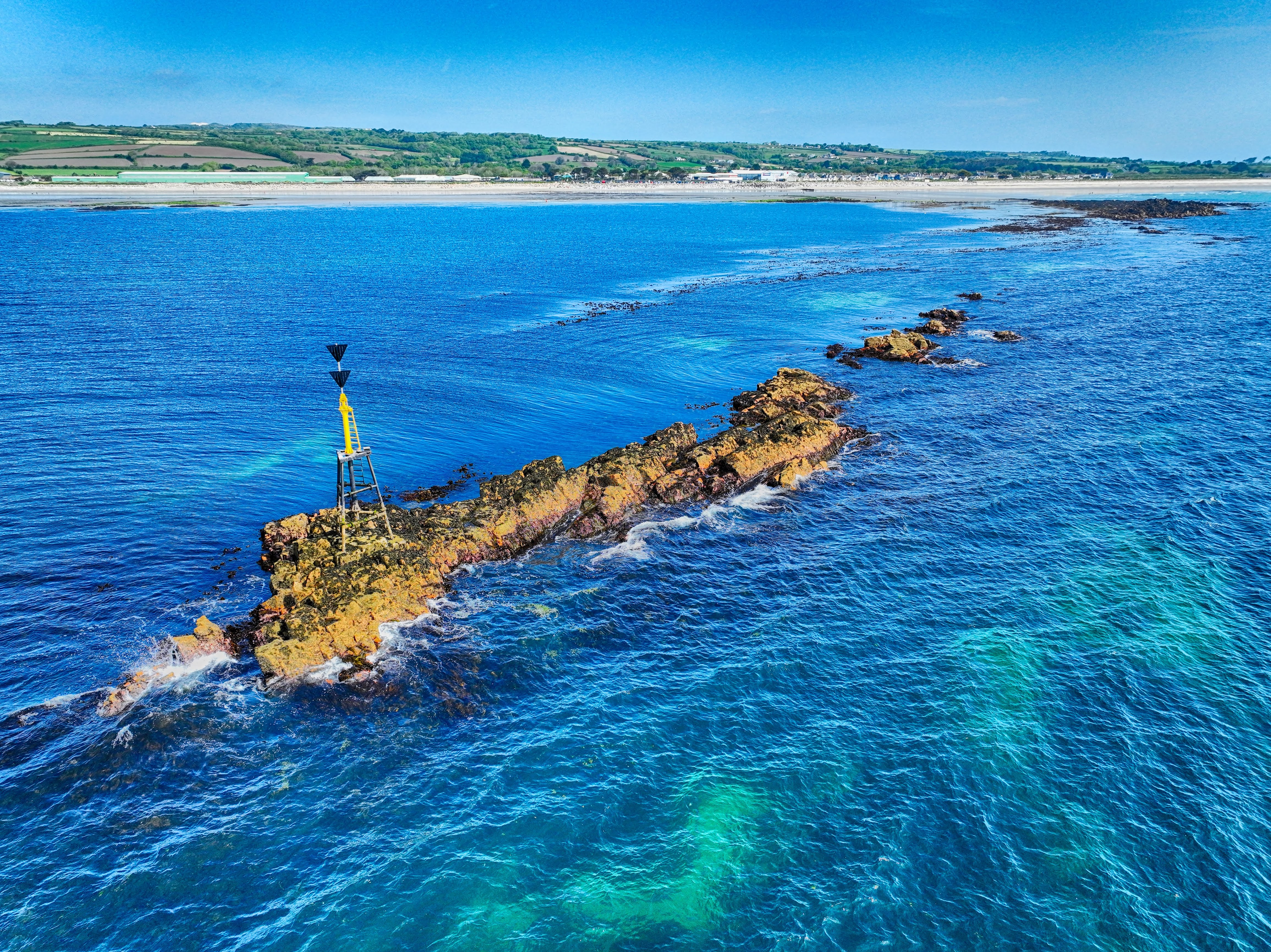
The offshore rock that the village is named after

The village is named after the offshore tidal Long Rock. (Note: The Long Rock itself lies at grid reference SW498308.) Long Rock is on the shore of Mount's Bay, at the centre of the 3 miles (4.8 km) beach, which stretches from Penzance to Marazion. The beach is backed by a sea wall, along which the Cornish Main Line and the South West Coast Path run.

== Amenities ==
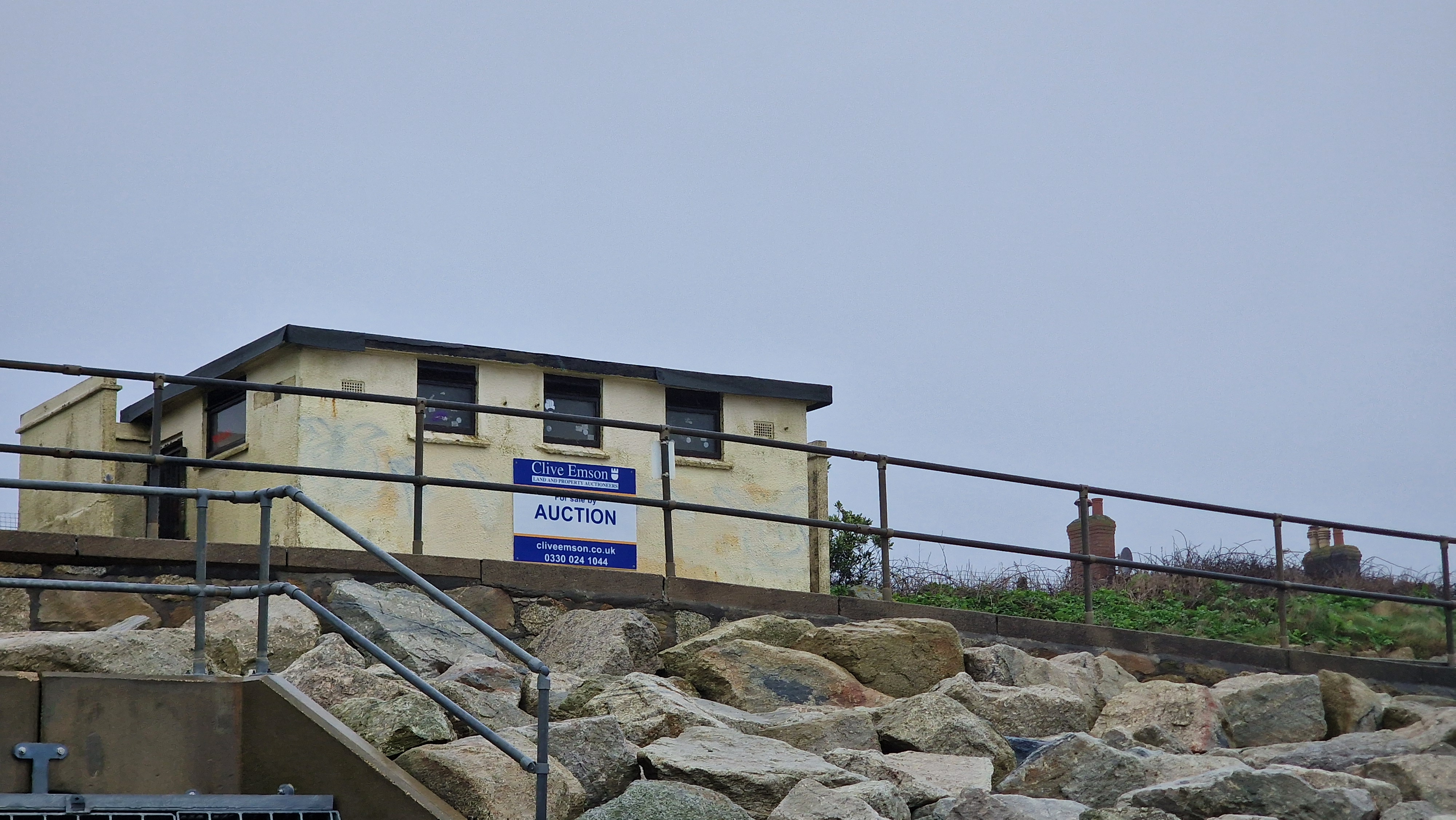
The former public toilets were sold at auction for £160,000

The nearest primary schools are located in Gulval and Ludgvan, with the nearest secondary school, Humphry Davy School, in Penzance.

There is a shop, post office, two pubs (one offering B&B), a care home, an equestrian and agricultural supplier, a hall which can be hired, two motorbike training places, a car rental business and several car sales businesses. The industrial estate contains a glass merchant, a computer repairer, a vet and a solar energy firm.

Long Rock Playing Field Association recently received a grant to install new play equipment. Penwith District Council built a new 'amenity area' in a field close to the A30.

Marazion Marsh, an RSPB nature reserve leased from Lord St Levan, is situated half-a-mile east of the village.

A Wesleyan chapel, on the old A30 between Long Rock and Newtown, opened on 21 June 1889. It was a replacement for an old, decaying ″clob″ building at Newtown.

== Transport ==
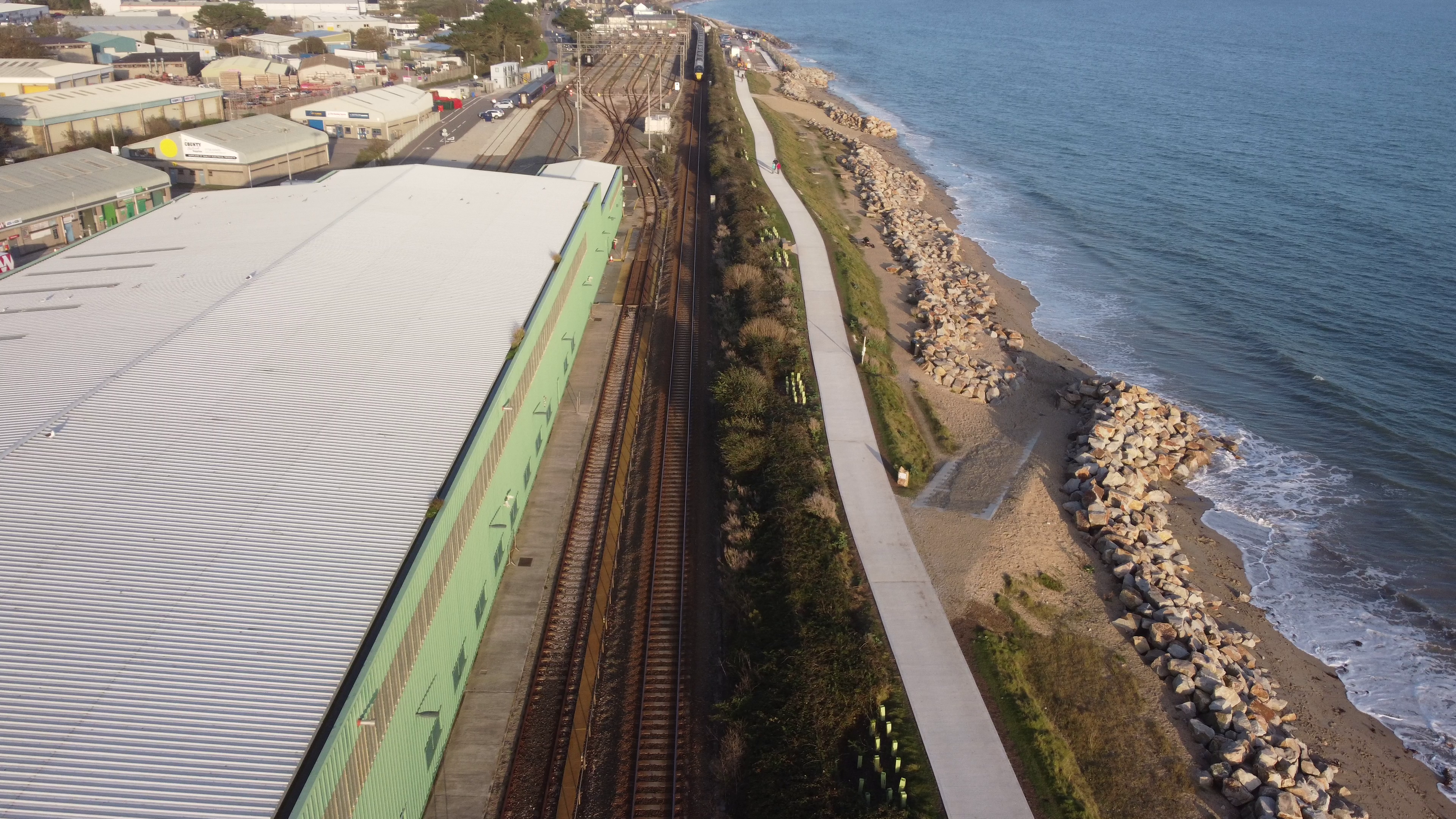
A train runs along the Cornish Main Line

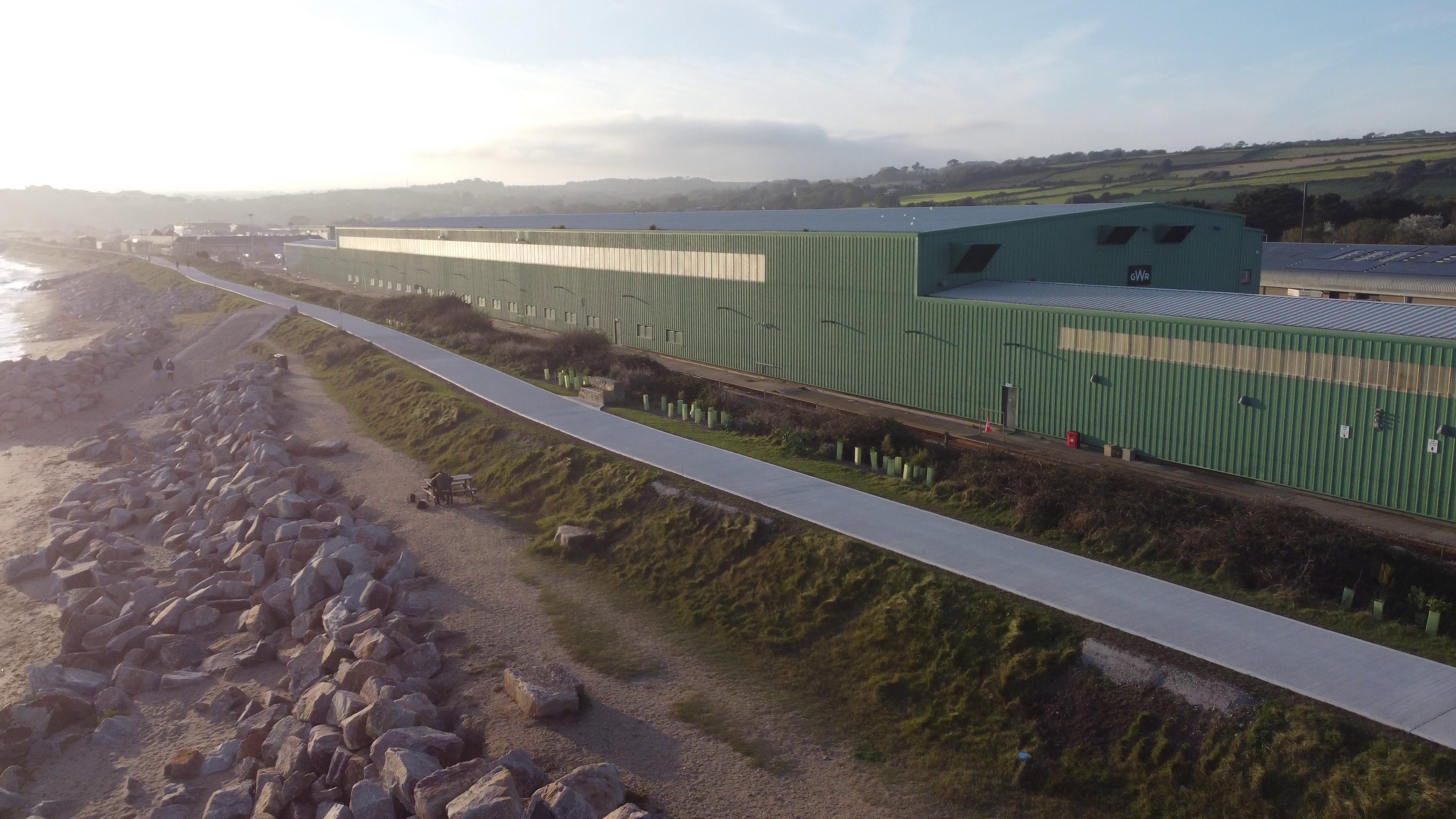
The GWR depot at Long Rock

The nearest railway station is at Penzance; Great Western Railway operates local and inter-city services to the rest of South West England, South Wales, the Wessex region and London.

Long Rock is the site of a railway motive power depot. Formerly catering to steam locomotives, it is operated by Great Western Railway and is the most south-westerly depot on the National Rail network. Now known as Penzance TMD, it is a refuelling and servicing depot for diesel locomotives and multiple units.

Long Rock has regular bus services to Penzance, Camborne, St Ives and Truro, operated by Go Cornwall Bus.

A dual carriageway bypass carries the A30 road north of the village; the land beside the road has been extensively developed with light industry and a retail park.

Penzance Heliport is situated between Long Rock and Penzance. The original heliport was demolished in 2014 and a Sainsburys supermarket, car park and trading estate was built on the site. In 2019, a new heliport was built on a site opposite trading estate, 10 yards (9.1 m) away from the original. In spring 2020, a scheduled service to the Isles of Scilly commenced.

The villages lies on The Cornish Way network of cycle paths.

== Media ==
The local community radio station is Coast FM (formerly Penwith Radio).

== Cornish wrestling ==
William Couch Jeffery (1826–1899), was from Long Rock and was champion middleweight of Cornwall for a quarter of a century including the 1840s and 1850s. He won many prizes in Cornwall as well as London. He was initially a miner and then a market gardener and fisherman. He spent some time in Australia and it was said that he had beaten the Australian champion wrestler, who was an Irishman after walking 160 miles to the match.
