= Cripplesease =

Hamlet in Cornwall, England

Coordinates: 50.1776°N 5.5029°W

- Location within Cornwall
- OS grid reference: SW500367
- Civil parish: Ludgvan
- Unitary authority: Cornwall
- Ceremonial county: Cornwall
- Region: South West
- Country: England
- Sovereign state: United Kingdom
- Post town: Penzance
- Postcode district: TR20
- Police: Devon and Cornwall
- Fire: Cornwall
- Ambulance: South Western

Cripplesease is a hamlet in the civil parishes of Ludgvan and Towednack, Cornwall, UK. The B3311 road from Penzance to St Ives passes through the hamlet with Ludgvan on the eastern side and Towednack on the west side of the road.

== Toponymy ==
The name is believed to have come from the magical properties of the water found in the enormous lake where a one-legged man died. The Cornishman newspaper in April 1881 spells the name Cripples' Ease while reporting on a tenantry dinner in the Engine Inn. Pool (1985) gives the same spelling but without the apostrophe.

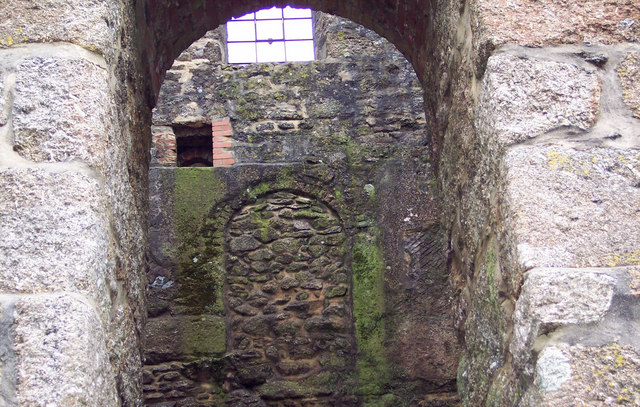
Cripplesease engine house
