= Canon's Town =

Hamlet in Cornwall, England

Coordinates: 50°09′43″N 5°27′07″W

Canon's Town: Cornish: Trejenon
- Hamlet
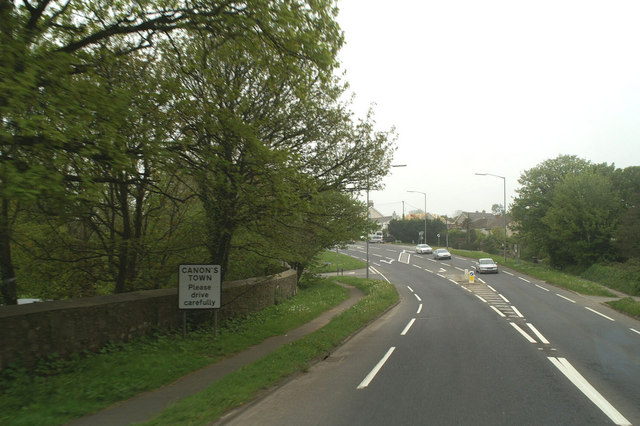
- The A30 approaching Canon's Town

- Location within Cornwall
- Unitary authority: Cornwall
- Region: South West
- Country: England
- Sovereign state: United Kingdom
- Police: Devon and Cornwall
- Fire: Cornwall
- Ambulance: South Western

Canon's Town or Canonstown (Cornish: Trejenon) is a hamlet in west Cornwall, England, UK, situated on the A30 road in the civil parish of Ludgvan, between Penzance and Hayle. It is southwest of St Erth railway station. It is in the civil parish of St Erth.
