= Goldsithney =

Village in Cornwall, England

Coordinates: 50.125°N 5.435°W

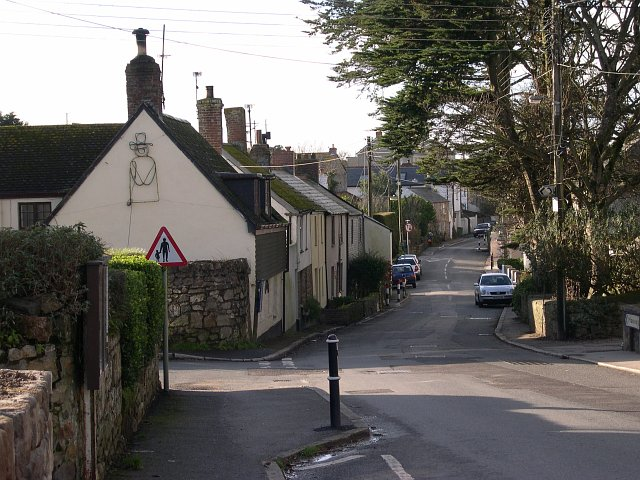
Goldsithney

Goldsithney shown within Cornwall

Goldsithney (Cornish: Golsydhni, meaning fair of St Sithney) is a village in west Cornwall, England, United Kingdom. It is on the B3280 at grid reference SW546306, about four miles (6 km) east of Penzance and one mile (1.6 km) east of Marazion. It is in the civil parish of Perranuthnoe.

The centre of Goldsithney is a conservation area and has two pubs (the Trevelyan Arms and the Crown Inn), a shop (The Stores Goldsithney). The village holds a Charter fair in August each year.

== Fair folklore ==
According to Popular Romances of the West of England by Robert Hunt:

On the 5th of August, St James's day (old style), a fayre is held here, which was originally held in the Church-town of Sithney near Helston. In olden time, the good St Perran the Little gave to the wrestlers in his parish a glove as the prize, and the winner of the glove was permitted to collect the market toll on the day of the feast, and to appropriate the money to his own use. The winner of the glove lived in the Church-town of Sithney, and for long long years the right of holding the fair remained undisputed. At length the miners of Goldsithney resolved to contest the prize, and they won it, since which time the fair has been held in that village, they paying to the poor of the parish of Sithney one shilling as compensation.

== Cornish wrestling ==
Cornish wrestling tournaments, for prizes, have been held in Goldsithney for a least the last 200 years. Tournaments were held at Henfor Farm, the Old Fair Field and Trevabyn Manor.
