= St Erth Praze =

Coordinates: 50°09′49″N 5°24′01″W

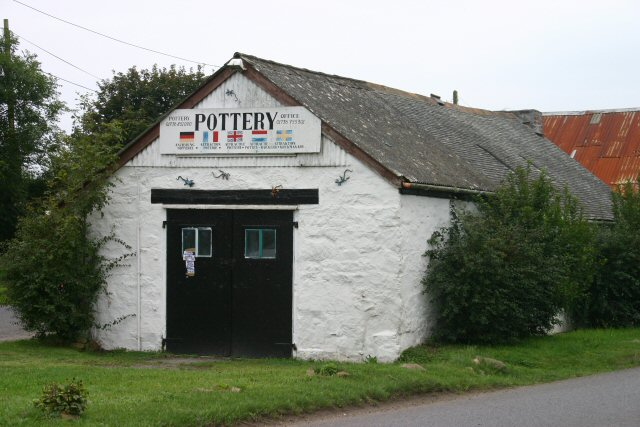
The Pottery in St Erth Praze

St Erth Praze is a hamlet in west Cornwall, England, United Kingdom. It is on the B3302 road east of St Erth.
