= Ludgvan =

Village in Cornwall, England

Coordinates: 50.144°N 5.495°W

Ludgvan: Cornish: Lujuan
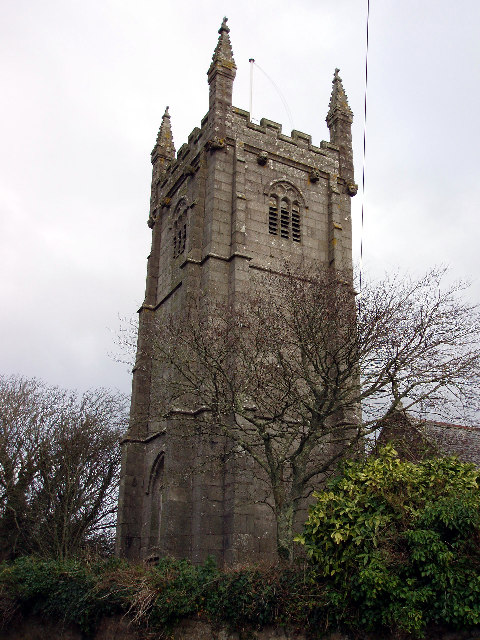
- Ludgvan Parish Church

- Location within Cornwall
- Population: 3,159 (Parish, 2021)
- Civil parish: Ludgvan
- Unitary authority: Cornwall
- Ceremonial county: Cornwall
- Region: South West
- Country: England
- Sovereign state: United Kingdom
- Post town: PENZANCE
- Postcode district: TR20
- Dialling code: 01736
- Police: Devon and Cornwall
- Fire: Cornwall
- Ambulance: South Western
- UK Parliament: St Ives

Ludgvan (/ˈlʌdʒən/ LUJ-ən; Cornish: Lujuan) is a civil parish and village in Cornwall, England. It lies 2 1/2 miles (4 km) northeast of Penzance. Ludgvan village is split between Churchtown, on the hill, and Lower Quarter to the east, adjoining Crowlas. For the purposes of local government, Ludgvan elects a parish council every four years; the town elects a member to Cornwall Council under the Ludgvan division.

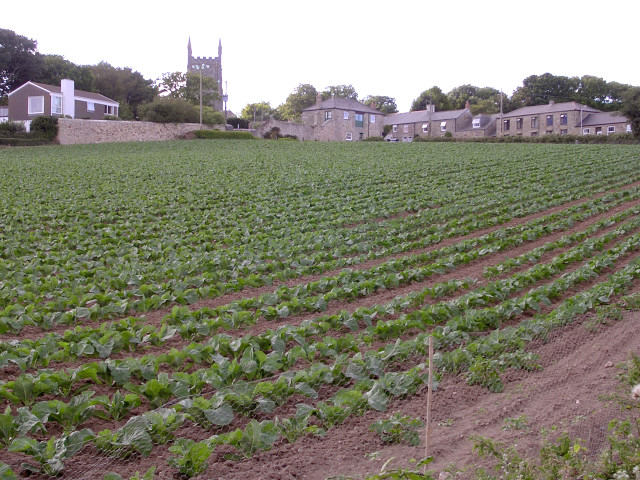
Vegetable crop south of Ludgvan

== History ==
Like many communities in Cornwall the legendary origins of Ludgvan are attributed to the arrival of its patron saint, in this case Saint Ludowanus. However, the place-name appears to derive from the Cornish for place of ashes or burnt place. Evidence for it being a saint's name includes documents in which it is named St Ludgvan and records of its name as Lewdegran and Ludewon. In recent times Ludgvan feast has celebrated St Lewdegran.

Ludgvan was mentioned in the Domesday Book (under the name "Luduhan") as falling within the manor of Ludgvan Lese, which at the time of record covered more of what is now the Penwith district including some parts of the modern parish of St Ives. The Lords of the manor of Ludgvan Lese kept certain shipping rights within the port of St Ives up to and possibly beyond the 19th century. Ludgvan Lease now exists as a hamlet within the parish. At the time of Domesday Book the manor had 3 hides of land and land for 15 or 30 ploughs. It was held by Richard from Robert, Count of Mortain; there were 12 ploughs, 8 serfs, 14 villeins and 40 smallholders. There were 300 acres (120 ha) of pasture, 27 unbroken mares, 22 cattle, 17 pigs and 140 sheep. The value of the manor was £3 sterling though it had formerly been worth £5.

On 12 January 1319, probate records indicate that the Church of St. Ludevon was in the town of Treguwal. Perhaps Treguwal (etymology: Tre = farm, place; Guwal, gweal = arable land) is either the nearby village of Gulval or a medieval name of Ludgvan's lower quarter.

=== Parish church ===
The church is dedicated to Saint Ludowanus and later jointly with Saint Paul the Apostle. It is probable that the original idea of a Saint Ludgvan began in the eleventh century. In 1316 it was referred to in probate records as the Church of St. Ludevon. The church was rededicated in 1336. Early spellings of the place-name vary between forms with and without 'Saint' referencing and differentiating the church and its surrounding churchtown. The building was originally cruciform and Norman but was rebuilt in the 15th century with a tower. In 1840 a south aisle replaced the previous transept and porch. The church was renovated in 1887, at a cost of about £800, under the instruction of Piers St Aubyn. The box pews were removed and replaced with open-ended pews of varnished pitch-pine, and the pulpit and lectern are of carved oak. The opening service was on 17 January 1888. The feast traditionally celebrated in the parish is the Sunday nearest to 22 January, in observation of the Conversion of St Paul. The last church services conducted in Cornish were in Ludgvan in the late 17th century (this claim is also made for Towednack).

There are four Cornish crosses in the parish; one is at Crowlas, another at Whitecross (this has a cross on one side of the head and a crude crucifixus figure on the other) and two are in the churchyard.

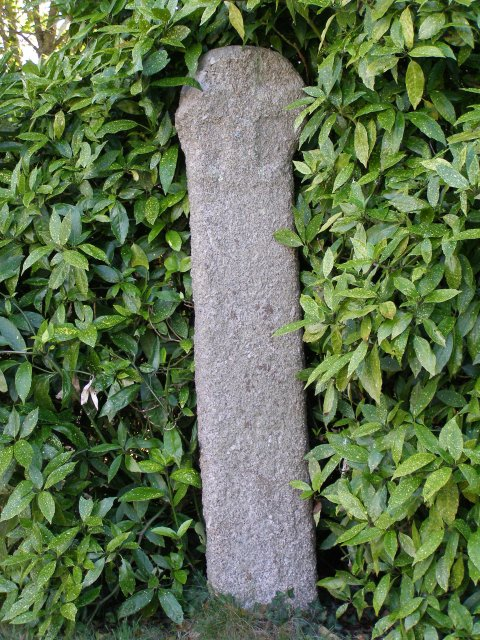
The tall Cornish cross in the churchyard

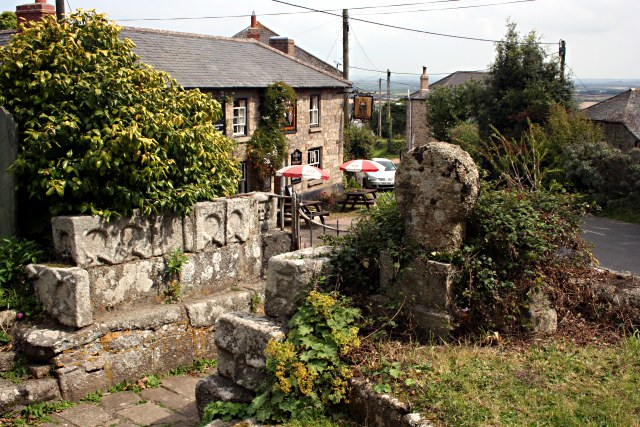
The short Cornish cross in the churchyard

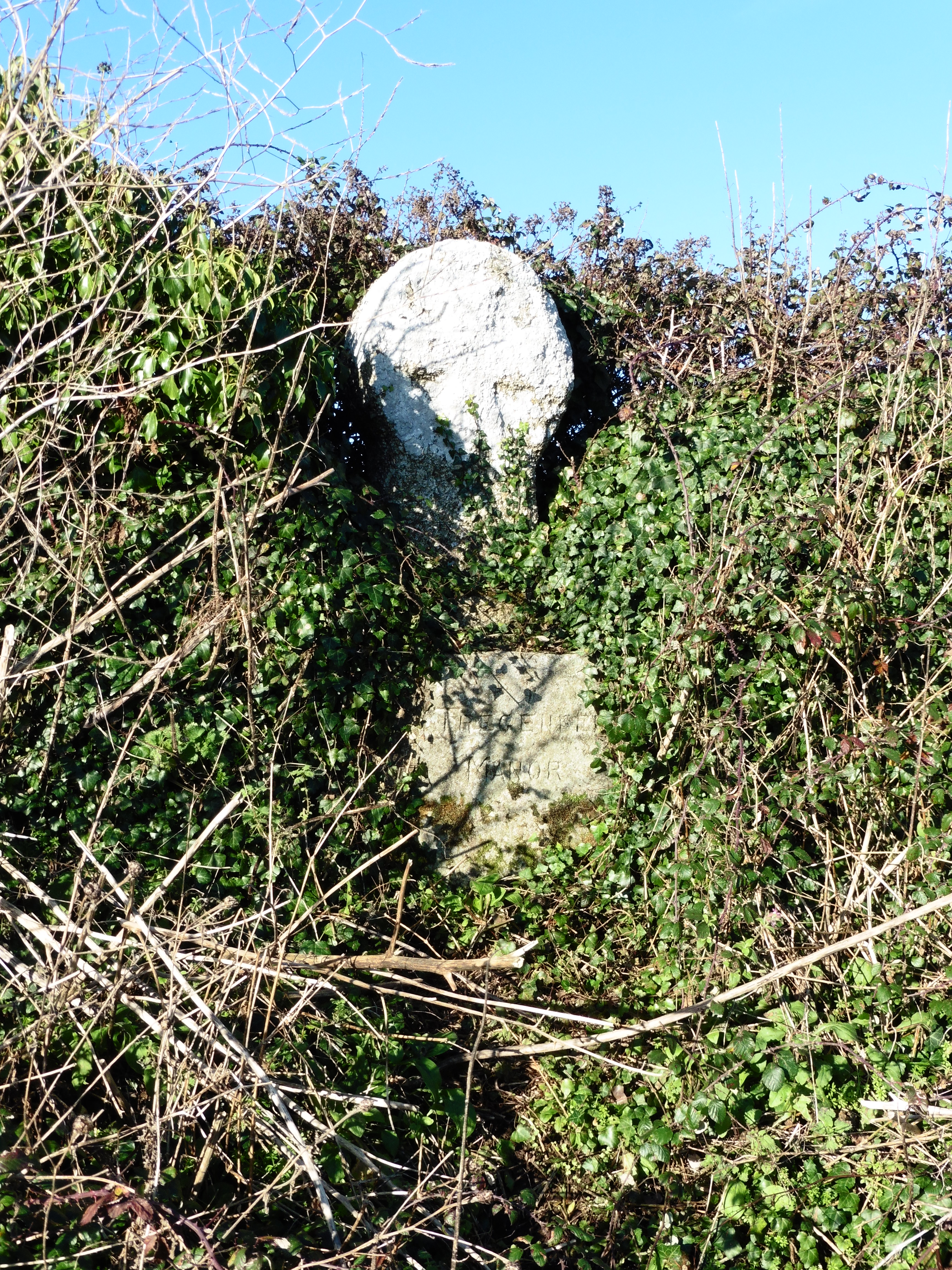
The cross at Crowlas

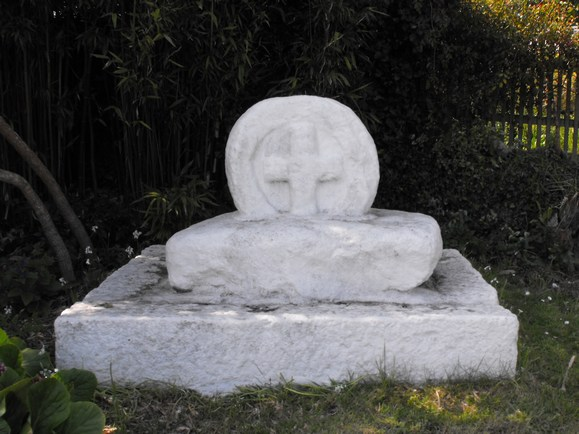
The cross at Whitecross

=== Mining ===
There was once a number of mines within the parish. Rospeath mine closed (in circa) 1856 and made large returns for the investors. There was no adit and the mine only worked to 4.5 fathoms (8.2 m) depth. The mine was reopened in December 1879 with an adit being cut, machinery erected to pump out the water and to sink a shaft. The width of the lode in the shaft is from 2 1/2 feet (0.76 m) to 3 feet (0.91 m). The mine is bounded by Wheal Bolton on the west, Wheal Fortune on the east and to the south Wheal Darlington, Wheal Virgin and others known as the Marazion Mines.

== Governance ==
There are two tiers of local government covering Ludgvan, at parish and unitary authority level: Ludgvan Parish Council and Cornwall Council. The parish council generally meets at Murley Hall on Church Hill.

=== Administrative history ===
Ludgvan was an ancient parish in the Penwith Hundred of Cornwall. In 1864 the parish was made a local government district, administered by an elected local board. Such districts were reconstituted as urban districts under the Local Government Act 1894.

Ludgvan Urban District was abolished in 1934. It was downgraded to being a rural parish in the West Penwith Rural District. West Penwith Rural District was abolished in 1974, and the area became part of the Penwith district. Penwith district was in turn abolished in 2009. Cornwall County Council then took on district-level functions, making it a unitary authority, and was renamed Cornwall Council.

== Rogers' Tower ==
To the north west of the parish and erected on the southern rampart of the ancient hill fort of Castle-an-Dinas, circa late 1700s is a gothic style folly called Rogers' Tower. The stone used to build the folly was apparently robbed out of the encampment walls. The tower was used by the admiralty as a navigation mark during the 1800s.

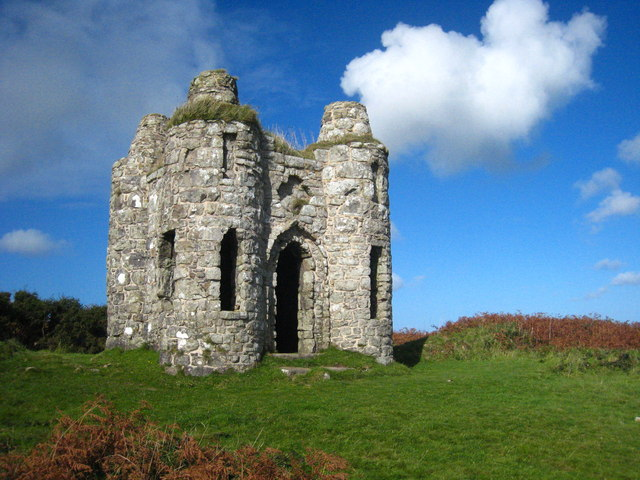
Rogers' Tower

== Tremenheere ==
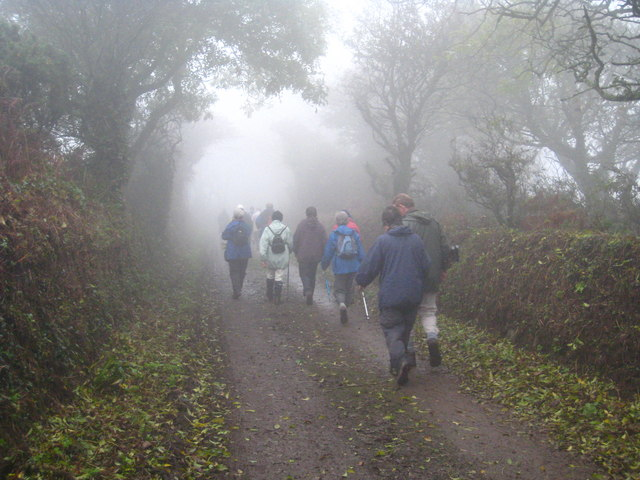
A group of walkers near Lower Tremenheere

At Tremenheere is the Tremenheere Sculpture Garden. The meaning of Tremenheere is "Standing Stone Farm" (Tre = place/farm, Menhir = standing stone) and there is another place of the same name in St Keverne.

== Culture and sport ==
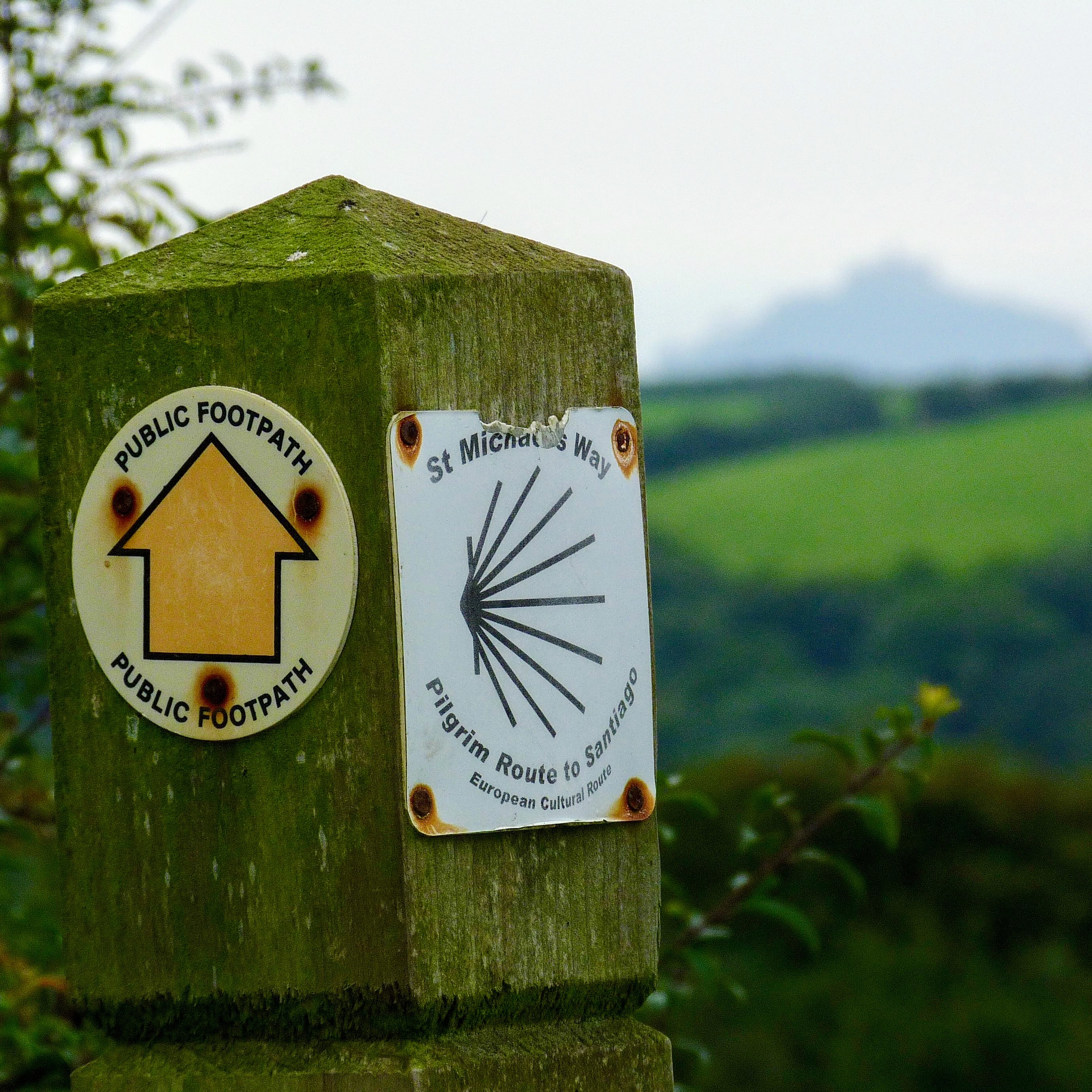
A St Michael's Way waymark on a public footpath within Ludgvan civil parish

The St Michael’s Way pilgrim trail, established in 1994, has more than half of its 12.5 miles (20 km) length on public footpaths and minor roads within Ludgvan civil parish. The trail enters the civil parish from St Ives on a footpath just north of Bowl Rock. The route then splits at Ludgvan parish church. The longer variant heads west out through Tremenheere, leaving the civil parish to Penzance CP on Long Lane near Gulval, then re-enters Ludgvan CP from the west, coinciding with the South West Coast Path until it leaves to Marazion CP at the new bridge over the Red River. The shorter route strikes out to the south-east from Ludgvan church, crossing the A30 south of Ludgvan Leaze and then the A394 near Bog Farm; the trail then crosses the Penzance-to-St Erth railway line at a pedestrian level crossing at Marazion Marsh before leaving the civil parish to Marazion CP at the old bridge over the Red River.

The village pub is The White Hart and is situated below the church. It is Grade II listed.

The village has an Old Cornwall Society.

Ludgvan Football Club currently play in the St Piran Football League West at their home ground of Fairfield. Ludgvan Cricket Club are in County Division 1 of the Cornwall Cricket League and also play at Fairfield. Ludgvan Cycling Club generally meets at the Community Centre on Sunday mornings.

The local community radio station is Coast FM (formerly Penwith Radio), which broadcasts on 96.5 and 97.2 FM.

=== Cornish wrestling ===
There have been Cornish wrestling tournaments in Ludgvan over the years including at Ludgvan Lease Farm.

John Roberts (1820–1892) known as "Johnnah" or "John-a" and born at Newtown, Ludgvan, was a famous champion heavyweight wrestler in the 1840s and 1850s, that more than once beat the famous wrestler, Gundry. After one such occasion, at the Penzance tournament, he was marched from one end of the town to the other accompanied by the mayor, several dignitaries and a band.

William Treglown (1827–1864) from Ludgvan, weighed between 200 lbs and 220 lbs, was about 5 ft 6in high and was the champion of Cornwall in 1853, 1854, 1856, 1858, 1861 and 1862. He won the London title in 1854 and 1859. He won the West of England title in 1853. He was the American champion in 1856. He also wrestled in Europe. He died of consumption in St Mewan.

See also Cornish wrestling at Crowlas.

== Legends ==
It has been claimed that Ludgvan was the home of the last native wolf in Great Britain.

== Notable residents ==
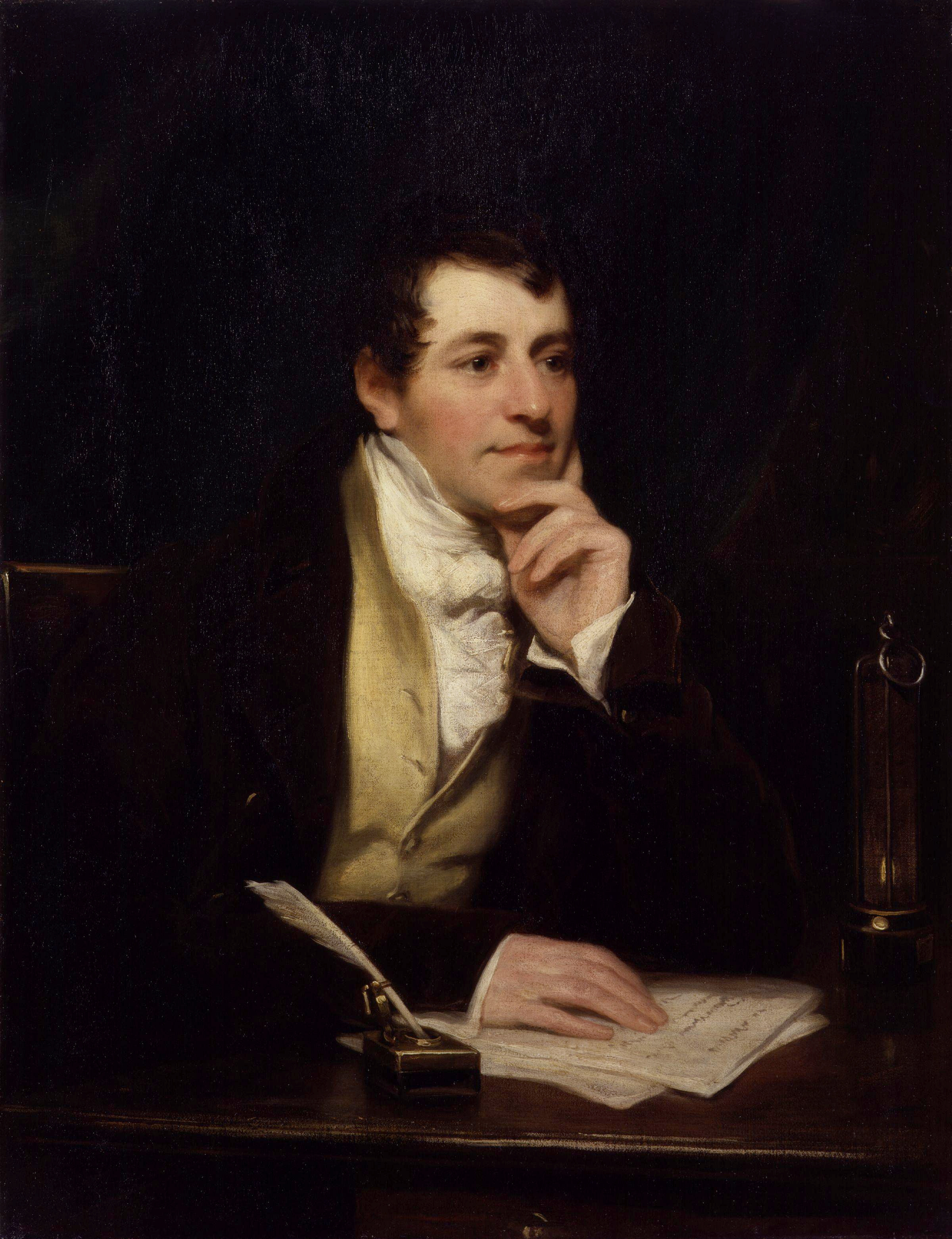
Sir Humphry Davy, 1821

- William Oliver (1695–1764), physician and philanthropist, inventor of the Bath Oliver biscuit, and founder of the Royal Mineral Water Hospital, Bath.
- William Borlase (1696–1772), antiquary and naturalist, was Rector of Ludgvan from 1722 to 1772.
- Sir Humphry Davy, 1st Baronet (1778–1829), chemist and inventor, came from Varfell, a local hamlet.
- Michael Loam (1797–1871), an English engineer who introduced the first man engine, to carry men up and down a mine shaft
- Robert Trewhella (1830–1909), railway engineer and contractor, was born here.
- Arthur Boscawen (1862–1939) rector of Ludgvan 1893 to 1939, horticulturalist who introduced the anemone as a commercial crop also introduced broccoli from imported German seed.
- John Trevaskis (1881–1963), rugby union player and team silver medallist at the 1908 Summer Olympics
- Claud Morris (1920–2000), a British newspaper owner who sought to make peace between Arabs and Israelis was born and died at Angwinnick.

== See also ==
- Cockwells
- Crowlas
