= Perranuthnoe =

Coordinates: 50°06′54″N 5°26′42″W

Perranuthnoe: Cornish: Peranudhnow
- Village and civil parish
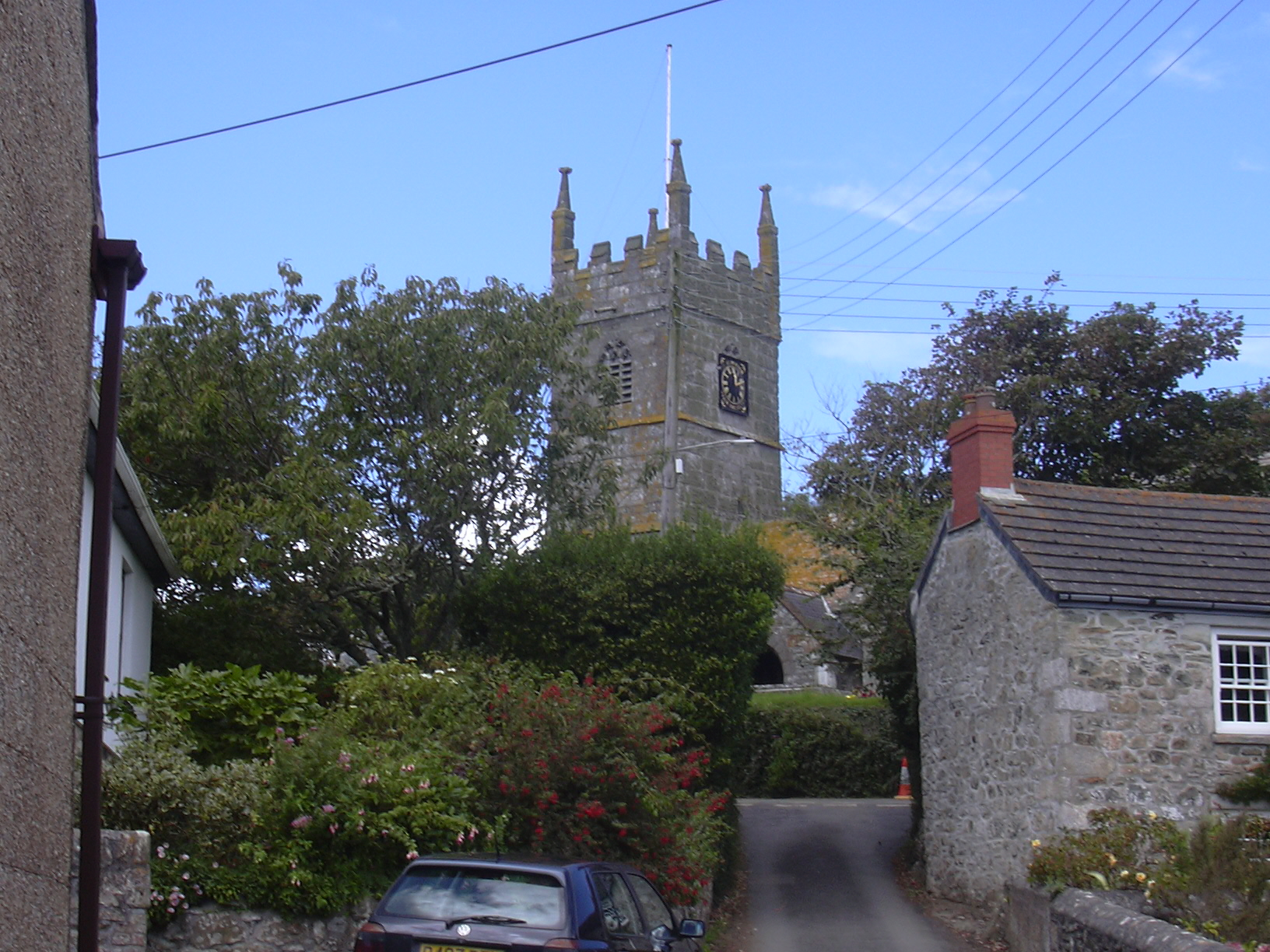
- Perranuthnoe church and village

- Location within Cornwall
- OS grid reference: SW541292
- Unitary authority: Cornwall
- Ceremonial county: Cornwall
- Region: South West
- Country: England
- Sovereign state: United Kingdom
- Post town: Penzance
- Postcode district: TR20
- Dialling code: 01736
- Police: Devon and Cornwall
- Fire: Cornwall
- Ambulance: South Western
- UK Parliament: St Ives

Perranuthnoe (/ˌpɛrəˈnjuːθnoʊ, -ˈnʌθ-/; Cornish: Peranudhnow) is a civil parish and a village in southwest Cornwall, England, United Kingdom. The parish population at the 2011 census was 2,184. The Parish includes the settlements of Goldsithney, Perran Downs, Perranuthnoe and part of Rosudgeon. The village of Perranuthnoe itself is situated on the east side of Mount's Bay approximately one mile (1.6 km) east of Marazion and four miles (6.5 km) east of Penzance.

== Geography ==
Perranuthnoe village and smaller settlements to the south of the A394 lie within the Cornwall National Landscape. Almost a third of Cornwall has the National Landscape designation, with the same status and protection as a National Park. North of A394 the Parish is part of the Cornwall and West Devon Mining Landscape World Heritage Site.

== History ==
The first historical mention of Perranuthnoe can be found in the Domesday Book of 1086, as Odenol. By 1235 this had become Hutheno, and was recorded as Udno in 1308 and 1373. Finally taking the form Uthnoe-veor in 1839. There is still a farm in the village called Ednoe-vean.

The parish church is first mentioned in 1348, by which time transepts with pointed arches had been added. Like most churches in Cornwall, the original church was probably a small building with two cells, a chancel and nave and is one of three churches in Cornwall dedicated to St Piran. By around 1500 a three-stage unbuttressed tower and aisle on the north side had been added and the bells are dated 1636, 1688 and 1832. In 1881 the church was described as ″... this dilapidated edifice″ and all the pews, benches, etc. were removed, along with the floor, and all the graves, bar one, ″... were levelled, and over the commingled human dust will be laid for sanitary purposes, a covering of fresh soil″. The one grave that was sealed and preserved belonged to the Reverend Johnson.

During the 18th and 19th century the landscape surrounding the village supported a number of tin and copper mines the last of which closed in 1900.

The barque Saluto was wrecked at Cudden Point, Perranuthnoe, in December 1911.

== Governance ==
For local government, Perranuthnoe elects a parish council of 10 members every four years across two wards (Goldsithney ward with 7 members, Perranuthnoe ward with 3 members). The principal local authority is Cornwall Council.

== Acton Castle ==
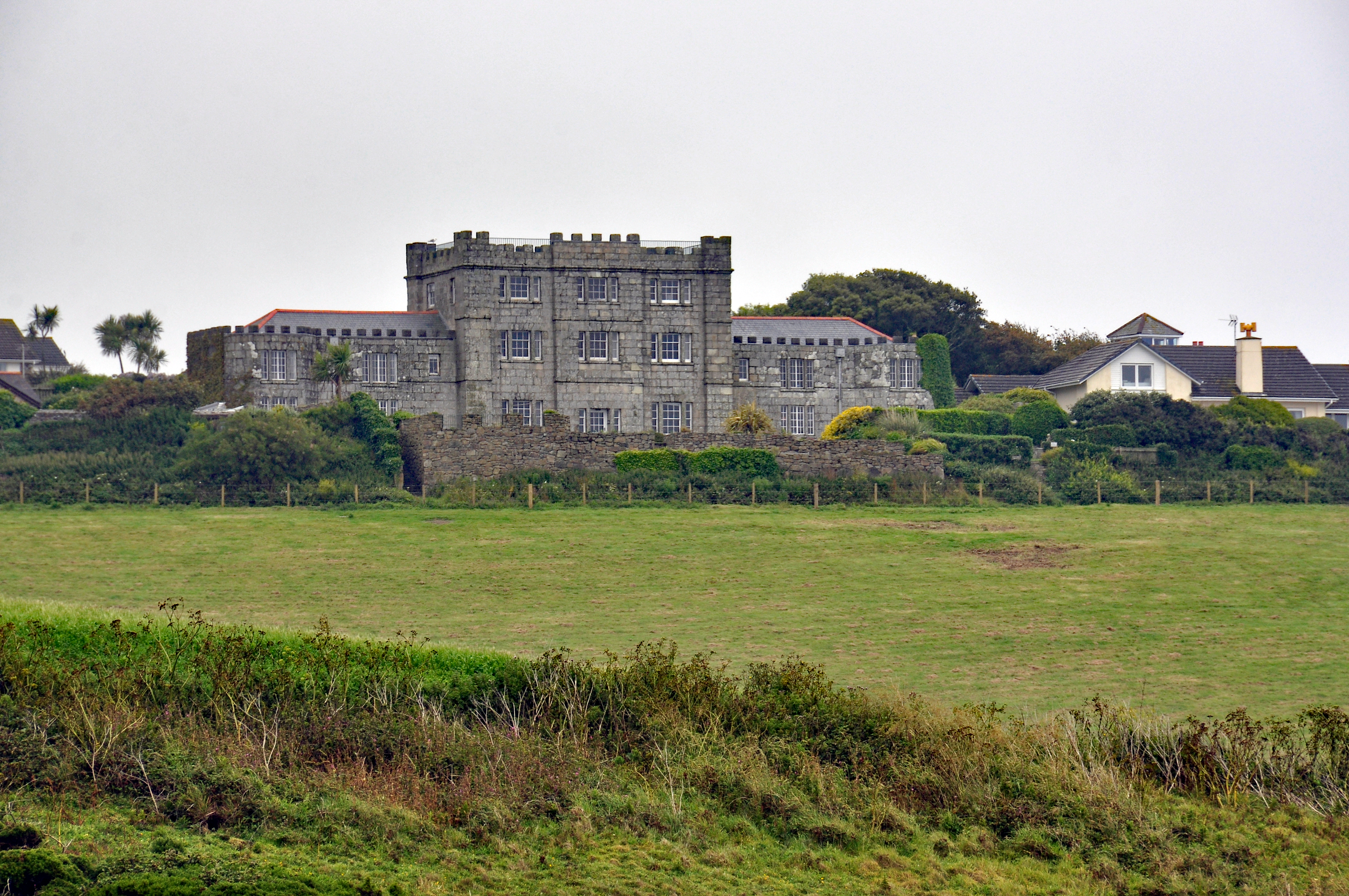
Acton Castle
