= Towednack =

Civil parish in Cornwall, England

Coordinates: 50.191°N 5.520°W

Towednack: Cornish: Tewydnek
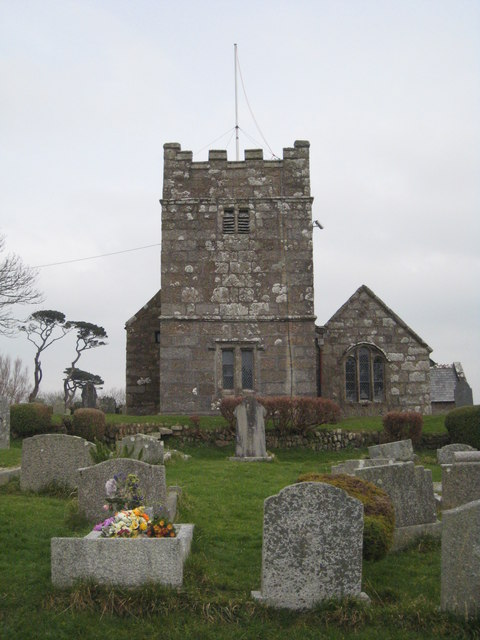
- Towednack Church

- Location within Cornwall
- Population: 357 (2011 census including Amalebra, Amalveor and Cripplesease)
- OS grid reference: SW486384
- Unitary authority: Cornwall
- Ceremonial county: Cornwall
- Region: South West
- Country: England
- Sovereign state: United Kingdom
- Post town: St Ives
- Postcode district: TR26
- Dialling code: 01736
- Police: Devon and Cornwall
- Fire: Cornwall
- Ambulance: South Western
- UK Parliament: St Ives

Towednack (Cornish: Tewydnek) is a churchtown and civil parish in Cornwall, England, United Kingdom. The parish is bounded by those of Zennor in the west, Gulval in the south, Ludgvan in the west and south, and St Ives and the Atlantic Ocean in the north and east. The church is about two miles (3 km) from St Ives and six miles (10 km) from Penzance.

Towednack lies within the Cornwall Area of Outstanding Natural Beauty (AONB). Almost a third of Cornwall has AONB designation, with the same status and protection as a National Park.

== History ==
=== Towednack gold hoard ===
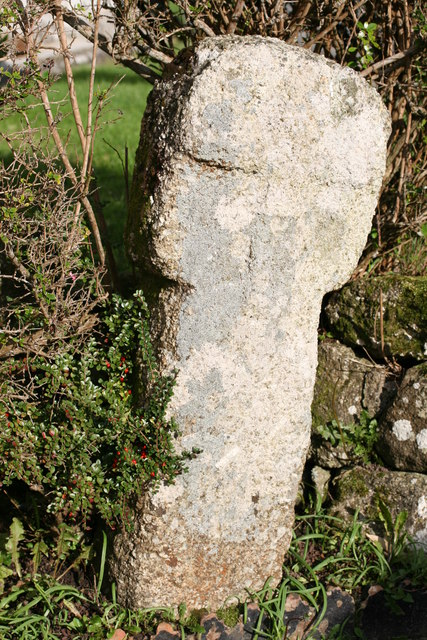
A Cornish cross in the churchyard

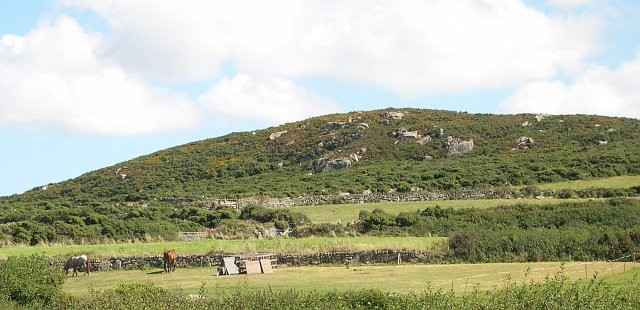
Trevalgan Hill

In December 1931 a hoard of gold ornaments was found in the parish. A sunken lane, known locally as Badger's Lane, leads down from Lady Downs onto the road to Amalveor. Here at SW4794 3759, concealed in an ancient stone hedge, was found a collection of beautiful gold objects, including two twisted neckrings, four armrings and two lengths of unfinished gold rod. One necklet consists of a single twisted strand of gold, and the other consists of three strands loosely twisted together. The gold is very fine, and probably came from Ireland. These ornaments date from the late Bronze Age and they now reside in the British Museum. A replica of the hoard can be seen at the Penlee House Museum in Penzance. In 2007 there were calls in the local Cornish press for the gold hoard to be returned to Cornwall from the British Museum.

=== Parish church ===
The church is dedicated to St Tewennocus and did not become parochial until 1902. It was built in the 13th century and has a plain tower. A south aisle was added in the 15th century. The font is of granite, 1720, and stands on a base which is an inverted Norman font. Towednack church is claimed to be the last church in which services were conducted in the Cornish language (in 1678), though the claim is also made for Ludgvan. The parish saint disguised under the name 'Tewennocus' is almost certainly St Winwalo (pet-form: Winnoc), also commemorated at Gunwalloe and Landewednack, as well as Landevennec, Brittany: the place-name being derived from Old Cornish "te-Winnoc" (thy St Winnoc [Winwalo]), now represented as Late Cornish Te Wydnek. The aisle, chancel and nave was restored under the direction of Mr Sedding in 1870 and in 1880 the tower and its roof restored. The cost of the 1880 building work was paid for by money from the weekly offertory. The Cornishman newspaper described the parish thus,

The parish is poor; the people are only a few hundreds; many (probably most) of them are Dissenters who never enter a Church; and the Church itself is small; and yet the offertory has been the means of doing more than Church-rates ever did. When the two broken bells are re-cast (will any rich man do this for poor Towednack?) this parish will process the most thoroughly restored Church in West Cornwall.

One of the bells has the inscription ″Baragwanath″ (wheat bread), a name which was still common in this part of Cornwall at the time of the visit of the Penzance Natural History and Antiquarian Society, in September 1882. They noted, ″a true chancel-arch″, which was described as the church's ″peculiar and rare feature″. Also seen was the benchends and their medallion-portraits of the 1633 bearded and hatted churchwardens. Their inscriptions are ″James Trewhela, warden″ and ″Master Matthew Trenwith, warden″.

Further restoration work was carried out in 1884 with the replacement of the wooden floor of the nave, which was destroyed by dry rot. The new floor was cement, covered with a wooden platform between the benches and red tiles replaced the ″rough″ slate floor of the aisle.

Until 1902 Towednack was a chapelry of Lelant; right of sepulture was only obtained in 1532. The early incised cross on a stone in the porch and the altar slab suggest that the subordination to Lelant only began after the Norman Conquest. The stone in the porch forms a bench; the cross shaft has crosses at both ends. Over the porch is a typical sundial of a wide class of Cornish church dials from 1720. The inscription reads ″Bright Sol and Luna Time and Tide doth hold. Chronodix Humbrale″.

There was a Cornish cross at Tredorwin; it was found in use as a building stone in a cottage at Coldharbour in 1880. It is now in the churchyard (illustrated right).

The Gorsedh Kernow was held in the parish in 1933, and the church was the first to hold a service, in Cornish, in modern times.

=== Mining ===
In the early part of the 19th-century Towednack was one of the richest tin-producing districts in west Cornwall. Mines included Wheal Reeth, Wheal Margaret, Reeth Consols and Georgia, and Conquer Downs.

=== Notable people ===
- John Quick (1852–1932) – Australian lawyer, politician and judge.

== Local government ==
For the purposes of local government Towednack is a civil parish electing a parish council every four years. The principal local authority in this area is Cornwall Council.

== Folklore ==
A story told by the Rev. W. S. Lach-Szyrma, to a group of antiquarians from the Penzance Natural History and Antiquarian Society, was the legend of the tower:

- ... the tower was never completed as during the night the 'Evil One' would knock down what the men had built the previous day. This went on for some time until the men gave up and the tower remains as it is today (1882). Similar legends also refer to nearby Lelant church and Brent Tor on Dartmoor.

== Popular media ==
In 1975 the church was the scene for the marriage and burial services in Poldark, a BBC series based on the novels of Winston Graham. It was also used as a location in the 1979 BBC series Penmarric.
