= SS Nile =

The name SS Nile has been given to a number of ships over the years. These include:

- SS Nile (1850), sank off Godrevy Head, Cornwall in 1854
- SS Nile (1919), later SS Empire Blanda, torpedoed in 1941

== See also ==
- Nile (ship)
- Nile (disambiguation)
