= Niles =

Niles may refer to:

== Places ==
=== Places in the United States ===
- Niles, Fremont, California, a community that is now part of Fremont
- Niles, Illinois, a village
- Niles, Kansas, an unincorporated community
- Niles, Michigan, a city
- Niles, New York, a town
- Niles, Ohio, a city
- Niles Canyon, California
- Niles Township (disambiguation)

== People and fictional characters ==
- Niles (name), a list of people and fictional characters

== Other uses ==
- Niles Community High School, Troy, Michigan
- Niles Car and Manufacturing Company, an American manufacturer of railroad equipment (1901–1917)

== See also ==
- Nile (disambiguation)
- Justice Niles (disambiguation)
