= Nyl (disambiguation) =

Nyl River is a watercourse in Limpopo Province, South Africa. Nyl or NYL may also refer to:

- Nyl Yakura (born 1993), Canadian badminton player
- Nyl., taxonomic author abbreviation of William Nylander (1822–1899), Finnish botanist
- National Youth League (disambiguation), various political and sports leagues
- New York Liberty, an American professional women's basketball team based in Brooklyn
- New York Life Insurance Company
- North Yemeni League, top division football league in North Yemen
- Yuma International Airport (FAA LID: NYL)

== See also ==
- Nyls
- Nile (disambiguation)
- Nyle (disambiguation)
