= List of shipwrecks in February 1871 =

The list of shipwrecks in February 1871 includes ships sunk, foundered, grounded, or otherwise lost during February 1871.

== 1 February ==
List of shipwrecks: 1 February 1871
Ship	State	Description
Cerbero	Austria-Hungary	The barque foundered off Livorno, Italy. Her crew were rescued by the barque Luca Padre (Russia). Cerbero was on a voyage from Marseille, Bouches-du-Rhône, France to Constantinople, Ottoman Empire.
Lilibec	United Kingdom	The schooner was abandoned in the Irish Sea 15 nautical miles (28 km) off the Isle of Man. Her crew were rescued by the steamship Cluth (United Kingdom). Lilibec was subsequently driven ashore at Tara, County Down. She was consequently condemned.
Margaret	United Kingdom	The ship was driven ashore at Dungarvan, County Waterford. She was on a voyage from Liverpool to Bristol, Gloucestershire.
Martindale	United Kingdom	The brig was holed by icea and sank in the Elbe. Her crew were rescued. She was on a voyage from Hartlepool to Pagensand, Germany.
Mary Ellen	United Kingdom	The ship ran aground and capsized in the River Eden. She was on a voyage from the River Eden to London.

== 2 February ==
List of shipwrecks: 2 February 1871
Ship	State	Description
Active	United Kingdom	The brig struck a sunken rock and sank off Lowestoft, Suffolk. Her crew were rescued. She was on a voyage from Rotterdam, South Holland, Netherlands to Newcastle upon Tyne, Northumberland.

== 3 February ==
List of shipwrecks: 3 February 1871
Ship	State	Description
Annie Frost	United Kingdom	The ship ran aground at the mouth of the Rhône. She was on a voyage from Calcutta, India to Marseille, Bouches-du-Rhône, France. She was refloated and taken in to Marseille.
Caroline Louise	United Kingdom	The ship sank in the Irish Sea at Belfast, County Antrim. Her crew survived. She was on a voyage from Maryport, Cumberland to Troon, Ayrshire.
Clara Lamb	United Kingdom	The ship was driven ashore at Dulas, Anglesey. Her crew were rescued. She was on a voyage from Liverpool, Lancashire to Saint Thomas, Virgin Islands. She was refloated the next day and taken in tow for Liverpool.
Deux Marie	France	The schooner was abandoned 18 nautical miles (33 km) south of Lundy Island, Devon, United Kingdom. Her crew were rescued. She was on a voyage from La Rochelle, Charente-Inférieure to Leith, Lothian, United Kingdom.
Unnamed	Flag unknown	The brigantine foundered off the entrance to the Larne Lough with the loss of all hands.

== 4 February ==
List of shipwrecks: 4 February 1871
Ship	State	Description
George	United Kingdom	The ship was driven ashore and wrecked at Flamborough Head, Yorkshire. She was on a voyage from London to Scarborough, Yorkshire.
Isaac G. Davis	United States	The barque was abandoned in the Atlantic Ocean (46°30′N 24°30′W). Her ten crew were rescued by the barque Sylvia (Norway). Isaac G. Davis was on a voyage from Falmouth, Cornwall, United Kingdom to Boston, Massachusetts.
Orchis	United Kingdom	The steamship collided with the steamship Denmark at Liverpool, Lancashire. She was on a voyage from Liverpool to Bombay, India. She proceeded on her voyage but sprang a leak off Holyhead, Anglesey and was beached at Tranmere, Cheshire. She was subsequently taken in to Liverpool.

== 5 February ==
List of shipwrecks: 5 February 1871
Ship	State	Description
Angie Friend	United States	The schooner capsized and sank in Boston harbor. Vessel was later raised and repaired. One crewman drowned.
City of Baltimore	United Kingdom	The steamship ran aground at Queenstown, County Cork. She was on a voyage from Halifax, Nova Scotia, Canada to Liverpool, Lancashire. She was refloated and resumed her voyage.
Princess Royal	United Kingdom	The steamship ran aground in the River Thames at Blackwall, Middlesex. She was on a voyage from London to Antwerp, Belgium. She was refloated the next day.
Teviotdale	United Kingdom	The barque ran aground at Exmouth, Devon. She was on a voyage from the Black Sea to South Shields, County Durham. She was refloated the next day and taken in to Exmouth in a leaky condition.
Wilson	United Kingdom	The brig sprang a leak 4 nautical miles (7.4 km) off the Bass Rock. She was towed in to Granton, Lothian in a sinking condition.

== 6 February ==
List of shipwrecks: 6 February 1871
Ship	State	Description
Braes of Enzie	United Kingdom	The schooner was abandoned in Sinclairs Bay. Her crew were rescued by the Wick Lifeboat.
Magdala	Denmark	The steamship ran aground on Agnaes Riff, in the Great Belt. She was refloated on 8 February.
Massachusetts	United States	The 351-ton whaling ship was lost at Scammon Bay, Department of Alaska, north of Cape Romanzof (61.7818°N 166.0372°W).
Ocean Dart	United Kingdom	The ship was sighted in the Atlantic Ocean (28°33′N 72°25′W) whilst on a voyage from Laguna to a British port. No further trace, presumed foundered with the loss of all hands.
Research	United States	The ship was driven ashore at Marcus Hook, Pennsylvania. She was on a voyage from Philadelphia, Pennsylvania to Antwerp, Belgium. She was later refloated and put back to Philadelphia.
Sèvre	French Navy	The Sèvre-class transport ship was wrecked at Cap de la Hague, Manche with the loss of 1,220 of the 1,230 people on board. She was on voyage from Calais to Bordeaux, Gironde.

== 7 February ==
List of shipwrecks: 7 February 1871
Ship	State	Description
Alster	United Kingdom	The steamship departed from Falmouth, Cornwall for Liverpool, Lancashire. No further trace, presumed foundered with the loss of all hands.
Ann	United Kingdom	The schooner was driven ashore and wrecked at St Bees Head, Cumberland. Her crew were rescued. She was on a voyage from Belfast, County Antrim to Maryport, Cumberland.
Bolivar	United Kingdom	The steamship ran aground on the Gross Vogel Sand, at the mouth of the Elbe. She was later refloated and resumed her voyage.
Catterina Accames	Italy)	The barque was abandoned off Linney Head, Pembrokeshire, United Kingdom. Her crew were rescued by the steamship South of Ireland (United Kingdom). Cattarina Accames was on a voyage from Oran, Algeria to Cardiff. She came ashore and was wrecked.
Cecil	United Kingdom	The brigantine was wrecked near Rosscarbery, County Cork. Her eight crew were rescued by the Coastguard. She was on a voyage from Lagos, Africa to Liverpool, Lancashire.
Johan August	Norway	The ship was wrecked in the Shetland Islands, United Kingdom with the loss of all hands.
Martha	Norway	The full-rigged ship was driven ashore at Hornsea, Yorkshire, United Kingdom. Her fifteen crew were rescued by the Hornsea Lifeboat.
Pacific	United Kingdom	The steamship was wrecked on Whalsay, Shetland Islands with the loss of all but two of her 28 crew. She was on a voyage from Norway to Hull, Yorkshire.
Sholton	United Kingdom	The ship foundered off the Shetland Islands.
Steadfast	United Kingdom	The fishing boat was wrecked on the Foreness Rock, Margate, Kent. .
Unnamed	Flag unknown	The barque sank 6 nautical miles (11 km) south west of Dingle, County Kerry, United Kingdom.

== 8 February ==
List of shipwrecks: 8 February 1871
Ship	State	Description
Anna	Germany	The ship was driven ashore at Newhaven, Sussex, United Kingdom. She was on a voyage from Guayaquil, Ecuador to Falmouth, Cornwall, United Kingdom.
Calliope	United Kingdom	The brig was driven ashore at Seaford, Sussex. Her crew were rescued by a smack. She was on a voyage from Fårö, Sweden to Hull, Yorkshire.
Crescent City	United States	The steamship sank off Galley Head, County Cork, United Kingdom. She was on a voyage from New Orleans, Louisiana to Liverpool, Lancashire, United Kingdom.
Etoile de la Mer	France	The ship was driven ashore and wrecked at Breaksea Point, Glamorgan, United Kingdom.
Fanny	United Kingdom	The schooner was wrecked at Clee Ness, Lincolnshire with the loss of all hands.
Huelva	Spain	The steamship departed from Swansea, Glamorgan, United Kingdom for Valencia. No further trace, presumed foundered with the loss of all hands.
Irene, or Treue	Germany	The ship was wrecked at "Mellumplat". Her crew were rescued. She was on a voyage from the Firth of Forth to Bremen.
Ocean Bride	United States	The schooner was lost off Brace's Cove. crew saved.
Tarragona	United Kingdom	The brig was driven ashore at Nolton Haven, Pembrokeshire. Her crew were rescued. She was on a voyage from Pomaron, Portugal to Liverpool. She was later refloated and towed in to Milford Haven, Pembrokeshire.
Wanderer	United Kingdom	The schooner was driven ashore and wrecked at "Sandlemere", near Hornsea, Yorkshire. Her crew were rescued. She was on a voyage from King's Lynn, Norfolk to Newcastle upon Tyne, Northumberland.
Unnamed	Flag unknown	The brig was driven ashore and severely damaged at Seaford. Her crew were rescued.

== 9 February ==
List of shipwrecks: 9 February 1871
Ship	State	Description
Alexandra	United Kingdom	The steamship ran aground on the Clippera Rock, off the coast of Anglesey. Her crew were rescued by the Holyhead Lifeboat. She was on a voyage from Liverpool, Lancashire to Cardiff, Glamorgan. She broke in two on 20 February.
Carolina Cassanova	Italy	The barque was aground on the "Sperwestre Sands", in the Bristol Channel. She was on a voyage from Cork to Newport, Monmouthshire, United Kingdom. She was refloated and towed in to Swansea, Glamorgan.
Jane	United Kingdom	The schooner was driven ashore at Formby, Lancashire. Her crew were rescued. Jane was on a voyage from Westport, County Mayo to Liverpool. She was refloated on 20 February.
Wilhelm	Flag unknown	The ship departed from Lewes, Delaware for London, United Kingdom. No further trace, presumed foundered with the loss of all hands.

== 10 February ==
List of shipwrecks: 10 February 1871
Ship	State	Description
Admiral Codrington	United Kingdom	The schooner was driven ashore and wrecked at Tynemouth, Northumberland. Her crew were rescued by rocket apparatus. She was on a voyage from South Shields, County Durham to Rochester, Kent. She broke up overnight.
Agabas	United Kingdom	The ship was wrecked at Saltfleet, Lincolnshire. She was on a voyage from Goole, Yorkshire to Faversham, Kent.
Agility	United Kingdom	The brig was driven ashore and wrecked at Bridlington, Yorkshire. Her six crew were rescued by the Bridlington Lifeboat. She was on a voyage from North Shields, Northumberland to London.
Agincourt	United Kingdom	The barque was wrecked on the Haisborough Sands, in the North Sea off the coast of Norfolk.
Ann Elizabeth	United Kingdom	The ship ran aground on the Newcombe Sand, in the North Sea off the coast of Norfolk. Her crew were rescued. She was on a voyage from Middlesbrough, Yorkshire to Briton Ferry, Glamorgan.
Annie	United Kingdom	The ship was abandoned in the Irish Sea off the Tuskar Rock. Her crew were rescued by the steamship Halcyon (United Kingdom).
Ann Rose	United Kingdom	The brig was wrecked on the Black Middens, in the North Sea off the coast of County Durham. Her crew were rescued by a lifeboat.
Arctic Hero	United Kingdom	The barque ran aground on the Haisborough Sands, collided with Agincourt (United Kingdom) and broke up. Her ten crew were rescued by Alert, Corunna, and the brigantines Italy and Holt (all United Kingdom). Arctic Hero was on a voyage from South Shields to Guadeloupe.
Arrow	United Kingdom	The brig was driven ashore and wrecked at Flamborough Head, Yorkshire with the loss of three of her six crew. She was on a voyage from Sunderland, County Durham to London.
Benjamin Sarah	United Kingdom	The ship was wrecked at Saltfleet. She was on a voyage from Goole to London.
Bebside	United Kingdom	The schooner was driven ashore and wrecked at Bridlington. Her four crew were rescued by the Bridlington Lifeboat. She was on a voyage from Blyth, Northumberland to Trouville-sur-Mer, France.
Betsey Ann	United Kingdom	The schooner was wrecked at Saltfleet. She was on a voyage from Hartlepool, County Durham to Ipswich, Suffolk.
British Queen	United Kingdom	The brig was driven ashore and wrecked at Tynemouth. Her seven crew were rescued by the Tynemouth Lifeboat Constance ( Royal National Lifeboat Institution). British Queen was on a voyage from Sunderland to London.
Brown	(United Kingdom of Great Britain and Ireland) Jersey	The barque was driven ashore at Aberdeen. Her crew were rescued by the Aberdeen Lifeboat.
Caroline	United Kingdom	The brigantine was wrecked south of Bridlington with the loss of three of her five crew.
Clarendon	United Kingdom	The schooner was driven ashore and wrecked at Burnham Overy Staithe, Norfolk with the loss of a crew member. She was on a voyage from Grimsby, Lincolnshire to Antwerp, Belgium.
Crown	(United Kingdom of Great Britain and Ireland) Jersey	The barque was driven ashore at Donmouth, Aberdeenshire. Her eight crew were rescued by the Aberdeen Lifeboat.
Cynthia Ann	United Kingdom	The brig was wrecked on the Black Middens. Her crew were rescued by the Tynemouth Lifeboat.
Czarina	United Kingdom	The ship foundered in the North Sea 1 nautical mile (1.9 km) north of Coquet Island Northumberland. Her crew were rescued by a tug.
Damietta	United Kingdom	The steamship struck the pier at West Hartlepool, County Durham and was severely damaged. She was on a voyage from London to West Hartlepool.
Dauntless	United Kingdom	The brigantine was driven ashore at Perranporth, Cornwall with the loss of two of her ten crew. She was on a voyage from Africa to Bristol, Gloucestershire.
Defence	United Kingdom	The ship was abandoned off "Rocliff". She was on a voyage from Port Mulgrave, Yorkshire to Jarrow-on-Tyne, Northumberland.
Delta	United Kingdom	The brig was wrecked south of Wilsthorpe, Yorkshire with the loss of all five crew.
Dorrie	United Kingdom	The sloop was driven ashore and wrecked at Donmouth. Her crew were rescued by the Coastguard using rocket apparatus. She was on a voyage from Burghead, Moray to Bo'ness, Lothian.
Dugald Stuart	United Kingdom	The brigantine sank at Clee Ness. She was refloated on 20 February and towed in to Grimsby for repairs.
Dutch Trader	United Kingdom	The smack struck the pier and sank at Great Yarmouth, Norfolk. She was refloated on 12 February and taken into Great Yarmouth.
Echo	United Kingdom	The schooner was driven ashore and wrecked at Bridlington. Her six crew were rescued by the Bridlington Lifeboat. She was on a voyage from Sunderland to Rochester.
Elizabeth Harrison	United Kingdom	The brig was driven ashore at Clee Ness. Her seven crew were rescued. She was on a voyage from Hartlepool to Calais, France.
Elizabeth Emma	United Kingdom	The brig ran aground at Hartlepool. She was on a voyage from Shoreham-by-Sea, Sussex to Hartlepool. She was refloated with assistance from a tug.
Enterprise	United Kingdom	The galiot was driven ashore and wrecked at Clee Ness.
Euphemia	United Kingdom	The brig was abandoned in the North Sea. She was driven ashore at Clee Ness. Euphemia was on a voyage from Hartlepool to London. She was refloated and assisted in to Grimsby in a leaky condition.
Flying Dutchman	United Kingdom	The schooner was driven ashore at Burnham Overy Staithe, Norfolk. Her crew were rescued. She was on a voyage from Middlesbrough to Maldon, Essex. She subsequently broke up.
Fortune Teller	United Kingdom	The schooner ran aground on the Stoney Binks, off the mouth of the Humber and was wrecked. Her six crew were rescued by the Spurn Lifeboat. She was on a voyage from Plymouth, Devon to Clackmannan.
Friend's Increase	United Kingdom	The Thames barge was driven ashore at Bridlington. Her four crew were rescued by the Bridlington Lifeboat. She was on a voyage from London to Newcastle upon Tyne, Northumberland.
Fonmon Castle	United Kingdom	The schooner collided with the brig Sofia (Italy) and sank at Penarth, Glamorgan. Her crew survived.
Giant	(United Kingdom of Great Britain and Ireland) Jersey	The brig was wrecked off Tynemouth. Her seven crew were rescued by the Tynemouth Lifeboat Constance ( Royal National Lifeboat Institution).
Great Pacific	Chile	The ship, which had sprung a leak off Cape Horn, was abandoned in the Atlantic Ocean 300 nautical miles (560 km) south of Bahia, Empire of Brazil. Her crew were rescued. She was on a voyage from Valparaíso, Chile to New York, United States.
Harbinger	United Kingdom	The lifeboat capsized at Bridlington with the loss of six of her nine crew. She was going to the assistance of Delta (United Kingdom) at the time.
Harriet	United Kingdom	The ship was driven ashore at Margate, Kent. Her crew were rescued by the Margate Lifeboat Friend of all Nations ( Royal National Lifeboat Institution).
Harvest	United Kingdom	The ship was driven ashore at South Shields. Her crew were rescued by the South Shields Lifeboat.
Henry	United Kingdom	The Yorkshire Billyboy was wrecked at Withernsea, Yorkshire. Her four crew were rescued. She was on a voyage from Selby, Yorkshire to Portsmouth, Hampshire.
Imod	United Kingdom	The brig was wrecked at Bridlington.
Ino	United Kingdom	The schooner was wrecked on the Nore. Her crew were rescued.
Jabez	United Kingdom	The brig was wrecked on the Black Middens with the loss of four of her six crew. She was on a voyage from South Shields to London.
James Bruce	United Kingdom	The ship was driven ashore on Ailsa Craig. She was on a voyage from Whitehaven, Cumberland to the Firth of Clyde. She was refloated.
Jane and Ann	United Kingdom	The brig was driven ashore at Middleton, County Durham. Her eight crew were rescued by the Hartlepool Lifeboat. Jane and Ann was on a voyage from Hartlepool to London. She broke up on 23 February.
Johannes	Belgium	The ship departed from New York for Antwerp. No further trace, presumed foundered with the loss of all hands.
Kate	United Kingdom	The sloop sank in the North Sea off the coast of Lincolnshire. Her crew were rescued by the brig Why Not (United Kingdom). Kate was on a voyage from Goole to Ipswich.
Launceston	United Kingdom	The barque ran aground on the Haisborough Sands with the loss of two of her sixteen crew. Survivors got aboard the Haisborough Lightship ( Trinity House). Launceston was on a voyage from South Shields to "Calafortis", Sardinia, Italy.
Laura Williams	United Kingdom	The schooner was driven ashore and wrecked at Dungeness, Kent. Her crew were rescued. She was on a voyage from Middlesbrough to Newport, Monmouthshire.
Lavinia	United Kingdom	The schooner was wrecked near Bridlington with the loss of all hands.
Light and Sign	United Kingdom	The schooner ran aground on the Herd Sand. She was on a voyage from the River Tyne to London. She was refloated and assisted in to South Shields.
Lina	Portugal	The barque struck the pier at Ramsgate, Kent and was severely damaged. She was on a voyage from London to Lisbon.
Look-Out	United Kingdom	The schooner sank at Clee Ness.
Margaret	United Kingdom	The dandy schooner was driven ashore and wrecked at Clee Ness, Lincolnshire. Her crew were rescued. She was on a voyage from Kirkcaldy, Fife to London.
Margaret	United Kingdom	The ship was driven ashore and wrecked near Bridlington with the loss of two of her crew. She was on a voyage from Seaham, County Durham to Ipswich.
Maria Anderson	United Kingdom	The ship was driven ashore at Hartlepool. She was on a voyage from Leith, Lothian to London.
Maria Elizabeth	United Kingdom	The brig was wrecked at Hartlepool. She was on a voyage from Seahamto the River Thames.
Mary	United Kingdom	The schooner was driven ashore at Filey, Filey. Her four crew were rescued by the Filey Lifeboat Hollon ( Royal National Lifeboat Institution). Mary was on a voyage from North Shields to Maldon. She subsequently became a wreck.
Mary	United Kingdom	The brig ran aground at Hartlepool. She was on a voyage from Dieppe, Seine-Inférierure to Hartlepool. She was refloated with the assistance of a tug.
New Delhi	United Kingdom	The brig foundered off Bridlington with the loss of all hands. She was on a voyage from Hartlepool to London.
Nymph	United Kingdom	The Yorkshire Billyboy foundered 1.5 nautical miles (2.8 km) off the mouth of the Humber with the loss of all hands.
Nouvelle Societe	France	The ship was driven ashore at Dunkirk. She was on a voyage from Caen, Calvados to Dunkirk.
Orinoco	United Kingdom	The ship was wrecked on the Black Middens. Her crew were rescued by the Tynemouth Lifeboat.
Peace	United Kingdom	The brig was driven ashore near Hartlepool. Her crew were rescued by the Hartlepool Lifeboat Sailors ( Royal National Lifeboat Institution). Peace was on a voyage from South Shields to Great Yarmouth.
Peri	United Kingdom	The ship was driven ashore and wrecked at Bridlington. Her crew were rescued by the Bridlington Lifeboat. She was on a voyage from Seaham to King's Lynn, Norfolk.
Produce	United Kingdom	The ship was driven ashore and wrecked at Bridlington with the loss of all hands.
Queen	United Kingdom	The brigantine was driven ashore at Carrack Gladden, Cornwall. Her six crew were rescued by the St. Ives Lifeboat Covent Garden ( Royal National Lifeboat Institution). Queen was on a voyage from Youghal, County Cork to Southampton, Hampshire.
Rapid	United Kingdom	The ship was driven ashore at Bridlington. Her crew were rescued.
Rebecca and Elizabeth	United Kingdom	The ship was driven ashore and wrecked at Bridlington. Her crew were rescued by the Bridlington Lifeboat. She was on a voyage from Hartlepool to Woodbridge, Suffolk.
Robert Whitworth	RNLI	The lifeboat, Robert Whitworth ( Royal National Lifeboat Institution), also was lost with six of her nine crew.
Rose	United Kingdom	The brig was wrecked on the Black Middens. Her crew were rescued by the South Shields Lifeboat.
Rowena	United Kingdom	The schooner ran aground on the Herd Sand. She was refloated and taken in to South Shields.
Sailor, or Sarah	United Kingdom	The schooner was driven ashore at Spurn Head, Yorkshire. Her crew were rescued. She was on a voyage from Hartlepool to Weymouth, Dorset.
Sicily	United Kingdom	The schooner was driven ashore at Clee Ness. Her nine crew were rescued. She was on a voyage from South Shields to London. She was subsequently taken in to Grimsby.
Spinney	United Kingdom	The brig was driven ashore 2 nautical miles (3.7 km) north of Bridlington. Her six crew were rescued by the Bridlington Lifeboat. She was on a voyage from Boulogne, Pas-de-Calais, France to Blyth.
Squirrel	United Kingdom	The ship was driven ashore and wrecked at Bridlington. Her crew were rescued by the Bridlington Lifeboat. She was on a voyage from Seaham to Lowestoft, Suffolk.
Stanley	United Kingdom	The brig ran aground off Middleton. She was on a voyage from West Hartlepool, County Durham to London. Her eight crew were rescued by the Hartlepool Lifeboat. She subsequently broke up.
Surama	United Kingdom	The ship was driven ashore at Bridlington.
Surprise	United Kingdom	The schooner was run into by the schooner George Canning and was driven ashore at Great Yarmouth. Her crew were rescued.
Teresita	United Kingdom	The schooner was driven ashore and wrecked at Bridlington with the loss of all hands.
Terminus	United Kingdom	The schooner was driven ashore and wrecked at Hornsea, Yorkshire with the loss of all six crew. She was on a voyage from Blyth to Trouville-sur-Mer, Calvados.
Thessalia	United Kingdom	The brig was driven ashore at Margate. Her nine crew were rescued by the Margate Lifeboat Quiver ( Royal National Lifeboat Institution). Thessalia was on a voyage from Sunderland to Malta. She was refloated on 15 February and taken in to for London.
Thomas and Isabella	United Kingdom	The ship ran aground on the Herd Sand. She was refloated and taken in to South Shields.
Thought	United Kingdom	The ketch was driven ashore and wrecked at Great Yarmouth with the loss of all hands.
Treaty	United Kingdom	The ship was driven ashore and severely damaged at Saltfleet. She was on a voyage from Grimsby to Antwerp. She was later refloated.
Two H. H's.	United Kingdom	The sloop was wrecked at Dunwich, Suffolk with the loss of all four crew.
Tyne	United Kingdom	The ship was driven ashore and wrecked at South Shields. Her crew were rescued by the South Shields Lifeboat.
Urania	United Kingdom	The ship was driven ashore at Bridlington. Her crew were rescued.
Valiant	United Kingdom	The brig was driven ashore and wrecked at "Priorshaven", near Tynemouth. Her six crew were rescued by the Tynemouth Lifeboat Constance ( Royal National Lifeboat Institution).
Violet	United Kingdom	The schooner ran aground at Hartlepool. She was on a voyage from King's Lynn to Stockton-on-Tees, County Durham. She was refloated with the assistance of a tug.
Vivid	United Kingdom	The sloop was driven ashore at Saltfleet. She was on a voyage from "Skitterhave" to London.
Vivid	United Kingdom	The ship was driven ashore at Bridlington. Her crew were rescued.
William Maitland	United Kingdom	The brig was driven ashore and wrecked at Ulrome, Yorkshire with the loss of all but her captain.
Windsor	United Kingdom	The brig was driven ashore and wrecked at Bridlington. Her six crew were rescued by the Bridlington Lifeboat. She was on a voyage from South Shields to London.
Windsor Castle	United Kingdom	The brig was driven ashore at Flamborough Head. Her crew were rescued by the Flamborough Lifeboat. She was on a voyage from South Shields to Lifeboat.
Worthy	United Kingdom	The ship was driven ashore and wrecked at Bridlington. Her crew were rescued by the Bridlington Lifeboat. She was on a voyage from Newcastle upon Tyne to King's Lynn.
Yare	United Kingdom	The ship was driven ashore at Bridlington. Her crew were rescued by the Bridlington Lifeboat. She was on a voyage from Sunderland to King's Lynn.
Zephyr	United Kingdom	The brig was driven ashore and wrecked at Kessingland, Suffolk with the loss of all hands. She was on a voyage from Hartlepool to Exeter, Devon.
Unnamed	United Kingdom	The ship sank in Bantry Bay.
Unnamed	United Kingdom	The pilot boat, coble, capsized and sank at West Hartlepool. All three people on board were rescued by at tug.
Unnamed	Netherlands	The smack sank at Great Yarmouth. Her crew survived.
Unnamed	Flag unknown	The ship was wrecked on the Cross Sand, in the North Sea off the coast of Norfolk with the loss of all hands.
Unnamed	Flag unknown	The ship was wrecked on the Corton Sands, in the North Sea off the coast of Suffolk with the loss of all hands.
Unnamed	United Kingdom	The fishing yawl was driven ashore at Bridlington. Her crew were rescued by the Bridlington Lifeboat.
Unnamed	United Kingdom	The smack was driven ashore at Sewerby, North Riding of Yorkshire. Her crew survived.
Unnamed	United Kingdom	The collier, a brig, was driven ashore at Sewerby. Her crew were rescued by the Coastguard.

== 11 February ==
List of shipwrecks: 11 February 1871
Ship	State	Description
Anne	United Kingdom	The schooner was abandoned in the Irish Sea. Her crew were rescued by the steamship Halcyon (United Kingdom).
Arrow	United Kingdom	The brig collided with another vessel and was beached at Southend, Essex. She was on a voyagte from Falmouth, Cornwall to Leith, Lothian.
Doune Castle	United Kingdom	The brig was abandoned in the North Sea 3 nautical miles (5.6 km) east of Scarborough, Yorkshire. Her crew were rescued by the schooner Tweed (United Kingdom). Doune Castle was driven ashore and wrecked at Burniston, Yorkshire.
Elizabeth	United Kingdom	The Yorkshire Billyboy was driven ashore at Holmpton, Yorkshire. Her crew were rescued.
Hotta	United Kingdom	The brig foundered off Robin Hoods Bay, Yorkshire. Her crew were rescued by a yawl. She was on a voyage from South Shields to London.
Ida	United Kingdom	The steamship was driven ashore near Hellevoetsluis, Zeeland, Netherlands. She was refloated on 13 February.
Iris	United Kingdom	The ship was wrecked on Great Cumbrae, Argyllshire. Her crew were rescued. She was on a voyage from Stranraer, Wigtownshire to Greenock, Wigtownshire.
Patra	United Kingdom	The ship ran aground off Lido di Venezia, Italy. She was on a voyage from Liverpool, Lancashire to Venice, Italy. She was refloated on 20 February and towed in to Venice.
Queen	United Kingdom	The ship was driven ashore and wrecked east of St. Ives, Cornwall. Her crew were rescued. She was on a voyage from Youghal, County Cork to Southampton, Hampshire.
Richard and Harriet	United Kingdom	The barque was driven ashore at Kingsdown, Kent. Her crew were rescued by the Kingsdown Lifeboat. She was on a voyage from Hull, Yorkshire to Pensacola, Florida.
Two unnamed vessels	Flags unknown	The ships foundered in the North Sea off Lowestoft, Suffolk, United Kingdom with the loss of all hands.

== 12 February ==
List of shipwrecks: 12 February 1871
Ship	State	Description
Antine	United Kingdom	The brig ran aground at Castletown, Isle of Man and was severely damaged. She was on a voyage from Waterford to Newry, County Antrim.
Elizabeth Martha	United Kingdom	The ship was driven ashore at Bootle, Lancashire with the loss of her captain. She was on a voyage from the River Duddon to Amlwch, Anglesey.
Hero	United Kingdom	The ship was wrecked on the Kentish Knock. Her crew were rescued. She was on a voyage from Southampton, Hampshire to Sunderland, County Durham.
Lise Riber	Belgium	The ship was driven ashore and capsized at Fort La Perle. She was on a voyage from Antwerp to an English port.
Merita	United Kingdom	The barque ran aground on the Newcombe Sands, in the North Sea off the coast of Norfolk and was wrecked. She was on a voyage from Cienfuegos, Cuba to Boston, Lincolnshire.

== 13 February ==
List of shipwrecks: 13 February 1871
Ship	State	Description
Ann and Elizabeth	United Kingdom	The ship struck a sunken wreck off the Newcombe Sand, in the North Sea off the coast of Norfolk and was beached on the sand. Her crew were rescued by a yawl. She was on a voyage from Middlesbrough, Yorkshire to Briton Ferry, Glamorgan.
Bellamy	United Kingdom	The ship collided with a Spanish steamship and sank in the English Channel off the Isle of Wight with the loss of two of her crew. She was on a voyage from Poole, Dorset to Bremen, Germany.
Ems	Germany	The steamship sank at Bremerhaven. She was on a voyage from Antwerp, Belgium to Bremerhaven. She was refloated on 1 April.
Morocco	United Kingdom	The steamship collided with the steamship Wyoming (United Kingdom) and was holed below the waterline. She was beached at Seacombe, Cheshire with assistance from the tugs Empress, Fire King, Knight Commander and Rock Light (all United Kingdom). One passenger was lost. Morocco was on a voyage from Liverpool, Lancashire to Constantinople, Ottoman Empire. She was refloated on 19 February and taken in to Liverpool.
Pierre Adolphe	France	Franco-Prussian War: The barque, a prize of SMS Augusta (Prussian Navy) was wrecked on the Norwegian coast with the loss of a crew member.
Simon	United Kingdom	The ship was driven ashore at Port Elizabeth, Cape Colony.
Stranger	United Kingdom	The schooner was driven ashore at Tramore, County Waterford. Her three crew were rescued by the Tramore Lifeboat Tom Egan ( Royal National Lifeboat Institution). Stranger was on a voyage from Gloucester to Tramore.
Sylph	United Kingdom	The ship ran aground on the Cork Sand, in the North Sea off the coast of Norfolk. She was on a voyage from Goole, Yorkshire to Sandwich, Kent. She was refloated.

== 14 February ==
List of shipwrecks: 14 February 1871
Ship	State	Description
Airedale	New Zealand	The 286-ton brig-rigged steamer struck a reef near Waitara, New Zealand, while en route from Manukau Harbour to New Plymouth.
Blonde	United Kingdom	The steamship ran aground on the Church Rocks, off Folkestone, Kent. She was on a voyage from Saint-Nazaire, Ille-et-Vilaine, France to London. She was refloated and resumed her voyage.
Brema	Germany	The barque sank off Lundy Island, Devon, United Kingdom. She was on a voyage from Liverpool, Lancashire, United Kingdom to New Orleans, Louisiana, United States.
Brenda	United Kingdom	The ship was wrecked on Lundy Island. Her crew survived. She was on a voyage from Newport, Monmouthshire to New Orleans. She was refloated on 2 July and was towed in to Appledore, Devon.
Dauntless	United Kingdom	The smack collided with the steamship Argos (Spain) off Southwold, Suffolk. Her crew were rescued by Argos. Dauntless was on a voyage from Colchester, Essex to the Orkney Islands. She came ashore at Covehithe, Suffolk. She was refloated on 16 February and taken in to Lowestoft, Suffolk.
Marequita	United Kingdom	The barque ran aground on the Corton Sand, in the North Sea off the coast of Suffolk. She was on a voyage from Newcastle upon Tyne, Northumberland to Cherbourg, Seine-Inférieure, France. She was refloated and resumed her voyage.

== 15 February ==
List of shipwrecks: 15 February 1871
Ship	State	Description
Cairngorm	United Kingdom	The ship ran aground at Last Point, Moray. She was on a voyage from Sunderland, County Durham to Lossiemouth, Moray. She was refloated and taken in to Lossiemouth.
Italia	Spain	The brig was abandoned in the Atlantic Ocean. Her crew were rescued by Zedora (United Kingdom). Italia was on a voyage from Cartagena to Liverpool, Lancashire, United Kingdom.
R. H. Purrington	United States	The ship was holed by ice at Cuxhaven and was beached on the Kratzsand. She was on a voyage from New York to Cuxhaven. She was refloated the next day and taken in to Cuxhaven.
Sedburgh	United Kingdom	The ship ran aground on the North Reef, off the coast of Antigua. She was on a voyage from Liverpool to New Orleans, Louisiana, United States. She was refloated and resumed her voyage.
Southern Cross	Canada	The schooner foundered off Bermuda. Her crew were rescued by the schooner Baltic (United Kingdom). Southern Cross was on a voyage from Saint John, New Brunswick to Sagua La Grande, Cuba.
Volunteer	United Kingdom	The schooner collided with the steamship Demetrius (Portugal) and sank in Cemaes Bay. She was on a voyage from Ardrossan, Ayrshire to Newport, Monmouthshire.

== 16 February ==
List of shipwrecks: 16 February 1871
Ship	State	Description
Ane	Denmark	The brigantine was wrecked at Laguna. She was on a voyage from Veracruz, Mexico to Laguna.
Camco	United Kingdom	The steam lighter sprang a leak at Kirkcaldy, Fife and was scuttled.
Gipsy Queen	United Kingdom	The ship was abandoned in the Atlantic Ocean. Her crew were rescued by Kate Agnes (United States). Gipsy Queen was on a voyage from Darien, Georgia, United States to Dublin.
Lebanon	United Kingdom	The ship was driven ashore at Spittal Point, Northumberland. She was on a voyage from "Yelsk" to Berwick upon Tweed, Northumberland.
Mary Anne	United Kingdom	The ship was driven ashore at Zakynthos, Greece.
Nereus	United Kingdom	The ship was driven ashore 3 nautical miles (5.6 km) north of Wicklow. She was on a voyage from San Francisco, California, United States to Dublin. She was refloated and taken in to Kingstown, County Dublin.
Resolute	United Kingdom	The fishing trawler was run into in the North Sea 45 nautical miles (83 km) south east of Lowestoft, Suffolk by the schooner Harald (Denmark) and was abandoned by her crew. She was later reboarded and taken in to Lowestoft.
Vesta	United Kingdom	The brigantine was driven ashore at Cromer, Norfolk.

== 17 February ==
List of shipwrecks: February 1871
Ship	State	Description
Avis	United Kingdom	The schooner was driven ashore in the Brass River.
Carl	Germany	The schooner was abandoned in the Atlantic Ocean (42°07′N 15°12′W). Her crew were rescued by the barque Nouva Gemma (Italy). Carl was on a voyage from Newcastle upon Tyne, Northumberland, United Kingdom to New York, United States.
City of Kingston	United States	The ship was driven ashore on Vlieland, Friesland, Netherlands. She was on a voyage from Philadelphia, Pennsylvania to Hamburg, Germany. She had become a wreck by 25 February. She broke up on 25 February.
Cruiser, and Teetotaller	United Kingdom	The smacks collided and both sank in the North Sea 30 nautical miles (56 km) off Lowestoft, Suffolk. The crew or Crusader were rescued by a smack. Four of the five crew of Teetotaller were lost. The survivor was rescued by the smack Commodore (United Kingdom).
Rake	United Kingdom	The schooner was run down by the steamship Maryport (United Kingdom) and sank off the Mull of Galloway, Wigtownshire. Her five crew survived. Rake was on a voyage from Maryport, Cumberland to Belfast, County Antrim.
Sarah	United States	The ship was abandoned in the Atlantic Ocean with the loss of four lives. Survivors were rescued by M. W. Norwood (United States). Sarah was on a voyage from Galveston, Texas to Bremen, Germany. She was subsequently taken in to Halifax, Nova Scotia, Canada in a derelict condition.
Wave	United Kingdom	The ship was driven ashore at King's Lynn, Norfolk. She was on a voyage from King's Lynn to Antwerp, Belgium. She was refloated and resumed her voyage.

== 18 February ==
List of shipwrecks: 18 February 1871
Ship	State	Description
Burns	United Kingdom	The steamship was driven ashore and wrecked at Nethertown, Cumberland. She was on a voyage from the Isle of Whithorn, Wigtownshire to Liverpool, Lancashire.
Eagle	United Kingdom	The ship was beached on Sheep Island in a sinking condition. She was on a voyage from Caernarfon to Aberdeen. She had become a wreck by 22 February.
Freedom	(United Kingdom of Great Britain and Ireland) Jersey	The schooner was wrecked on the Minquiers. Her crew survived. She was on a voyage from Liverpool to Jersey.
Ida Catton	(Dominion of Newfoundland) Newfoundland Colony	The brigantine was abandoned in the Atlantic Ocean. Her crew were rescued by the brig Canada ( Canada. Ida Cutter was on a voyage from Saint John's to Matanzas, Cuba.
James Stonard	United Kingdom	The ship ran aground at the mouth of the River Mersey. She was on a voyage from Pomaron, Portugal to Liverpool.
Jane Innes	United Kingdom	The ship ran aground on the Pennington Spit, on the coast of Hampshire. She was on a voyage from Swansea, Glamorgan to Southampton, Hampshire.
Primus	United Kingdom	The steamship collided with the brig General Nott (United Kingdom) and sank at Valkenisse, Zeeland, Netherlands. She was on a voyage from London to Antwerp, Belgium or vice versa. She was refloated and taken in to Antwerp.
Tuskar	United Kingdom	The tug was run down and severely damaged by the steamship Minnia (United Kingdom) at Cardiff, Glamorgan.
William Pitt	United Kingdom	The brig collided with Thames (United Kingdom) and sank in the River Thames at Northfleet, Kent. Her crew survived. She was on a voyage from Hartlepool, County Durham to London.

== 19 February ==
List of shipwrecks: 19 February 1871
Ship	State	Description
Amelia	Italy	The barque was driven ashore near Egremont, Lancashire, United Kingdom. She was on a voyage from Odesa, Russia to Liverpool, Lancashire. She was refloated and taken in to Liverpool.
Nimrod	Canada	The ship was abandoned in the Atlantic Ocean. Her crew were rescued. She was on a voyage from Halifax, Nova Scotia to Kingston, Jamaica.

== 20 February ==
List of shipwrecks: 20 February 1871
Ship	State	Description
Admiral Lyons	United Kingdom	The ship was abandoned in the Atlantic Ocean. Her crew were rescued. She was on a voyage from Pensacola, Florida to Bristol, Gloucestershire.
Amazon	United Kingdom	The ship ran aground on the South Sand, in the Strait of Malacca. She was on a voyage from Cardiff, Glamorgan to Singapore, Straits Settlements.
Andromeda	United Kingdom	The full-rigged ship was wrecked in the Penghu Islands. Her crew were rescued. She was on a voyage from Shanghai, China to Saigon, French Indo-China.
Banshee	New Zealand	The 70-ton schooner foundered after holing on a reef near Moeraki, New Zealand, while en route from Nelson to Dunedin. The five men on board took to the lifeboat, but it capsized. Only one of the five crew survived.
Edith Wonser	United Kingdom	The schooner was wrecked on the Western Banks with the loss of all twelve crew.
Fete Dieu	France	The ship ran aground off Egremont, Lancashire, United Kingdom. She was on a voyage from Bayonne, Basses-Pyrénées to Liverpool, Lancashire.
Freedom	United Kingdom	The ship struck the Minquiers, in the Channel Islands and sank. Her crew were rescued. She was on a voyage from Liverpool to Jersey, Channel Islands.
Joseph Sprott	United Kingdom	The barque was driven ashore and wrecked at Galley Head County Cork with the presumed loss of all hands. She was on a voyage from Liverpool to Manila, Spanish East Indies.
Maria	Portugal	The barque was wrecked on the Cabadello Rock, off Porto. She was on a voyage from Liverpool to Porto.
Ottaway	United Kingdom	The brigantine was abandoned in the Atlantic Ocean. Her crew were rescued by the barque Nouveau Coriolau (France).
Pomona	United Kingdom	The brig was driven ashore at Red Tun, near Boulmer, Northumberland.
River Nith	United Kingdom	The ship ran aground at Criccieth Castle, Caernarfonshire. Her crew were rescued by the Port Madoc Lifeboat. She was on a voyage from Calcutta, India to Liverpool. She was refloated and towed to Liverpool by the tug Black Prince (United Kingdom).
Zoë	United Kingdom	The steamship was wrecked near Halifax, Nova Scotia, Canada. She was on a voyage from New York, United States to Brest, Finistère, France.

== 21 February ==
List of shipwrecks: 21 February 1871
Ship	State	Description
Abdul Medjid	United Kingdom	The barque was run into by the brig Western Star (United Kingdom) and was then driven ashore in Algoa Bay. Her crew were rescued. She was consequently condemned.
Avon	United Kingdom	The ship departed from Penarth, Glamorgan for Hong Kong. No further trace, presumed foundered with the loss of all hands.
Justine	France	The brig was wrecked on the Chick Said, in the Bab-el-Mandeb. Her crew were rescued.
HMS Pheseant	Royal Navy	The Albacore-class gunboat collided with the steamship Græcia (France) at Havre de Grâce, Seine-Inférieure, France and was severely damaged.
Priory	United Kingdom	The ship was driven ashore at Raven Point, County Wexford. She was on a voyage from Dublin to Wexford. She was refloated on 23 February.
Union	France	The brig was wrecked on the Chick Said. Her crew were rescued.

== 22 February ==
List of shipwrecks: 22 February 1871
Ship	State	Description
America	France	The ship was wrecked 30 nautical miles (56 km) south of "Cape Pilar", Chile. Her eighteen crew took to a boat. Seventeen survivors were rescued on 5 April by RMS Patagonia (United Kingdom). America was on a voyage from Bordeaux, Gironde to a port in Central America.
Elizabeth	(Dominion of Newfoundland) Newfoundland Colony	The schooner foundered at Fortune Bay.
F. A. de Bengoechea	Spain	The barque was wrecked on The Skerries, Anglesey, United Kingdom. Her crew were rescued. She was on a voyage from Liverpool, Lancashire, United Kingdom to Havana, Cuba.
Jane Kilgour	United Kingdom	The barque ran aground on the South Cross Sand, in the North Sea off the coast of Norfolk and was wrecked. Her thirteen crew were rescued by the Caistor Lifeboat. She was on a voyage from Alloa, Clackmannanshire to Demerara, British Guiana.
Maria	United Kingdom	The ship was driven ashore on Amrum, Germany. She was on a voyage from Liverpool to Bremen, Germany. She was refloated on 17 May and taken in to "Kniephaven" for repairs.
Undine	United Kingdom	The steamship was driven ashore near Bideford, Devon. She was on a voyage from Bideford to Bristol, Gloucestershire.
Unnamed	United Kingdom	The pilot boat was run down and sunk at Helmsdale, Sutherland by Morning Star (United Kingdom) with the loss of one life.

== 23 February ==
List of shipwrecks: 23 February 1871
Ship	State	Description
Sea Venture	United Kingdom	The coble foundered off Staithes, Yorkshire with.

== 24 February ==
List of shipwrecks: 24 February 1871
Ship	State	Description
Duisberg	Netherlands	The ship ran aground between Brouwershaven and Hellevoetsluis, Zeeland. She was on a voyage from Java, Netherlands East Indies to a Dutch port. She was refloated in early March.
Elizabeth	United Kingdom	The schooner collided with the steamship Black Swan (United Kingdom) and foundered off Great Yarmouth, Norfolk. Her crew were rescued by Black Swan.
Lightcliffe	United Kingdom	The ship ran aground in the Goatzacoalcos River. She was on a voyage from Minatitlán, Mexico to Falmouth, Cornwall or Queenstown, County Cork.
St. Thomas Packet	United Kingdom	The ship was driven ashore at Dover, Kent. She was on a voyage from Blyth, Northumberland to London. She was refloated and taken in to The Downs.

== 25 February ==
List of shipwrecks: 25 February 1871
Ship	State	Description
Airedale	New Zealand	The steamship was wrecked near the mouth of the Waitara River. All on board survived. She was on a voyage from Invercargill to San Francisco, California.
Thessalia	United Kingdom	The ship ran aground at Whitby, Yorkshire. She was on a voyage from Sunderland, County Durham to Malta.
Tiber	United Kingdom	The ship ran aground at Smyrna, Ottoman Empire. She was on a voyage from Smyrna to Ottoman Empire. She was refloated the next day with assistance from an Ottoman Navy frigate and resumed her voyage on 28 February.

== 26 February ==
List of shipwrecks: 26 February 1871
Ship	State	Description
Georges	United Kingdom	The barque was driven ashore at Seascale, Cumberland. Her crew were rescued. She was on a voyage from San Francisco, California, United States to Maryport, Cumberland.
Lykurg	United Kingdom	The ship collided with the steamship Nevada (United Kingdom) and sank off Point Lynas, Anglesey, United Kingdom. Her crew were rescued. Lykurg was on a voyage from Liverpool, Lancashire, United Kingdom to Rio de Janeiro, Brazil.
One	United Kingdom	The ssloop sank at Penmon, Anglesey. Her crew were rescued. She was on a voyage from Chester, Cheshire to Caernarfon.
Sarah Princess	United Kingdom	The ship was wrecked on the Goodwin Sands, Kent. Her crew were rescued.
Travancore	United Kingdom	The ship was driven ashore and wrecked on Westray, Orkney Islands. Her crew were rescued. She was on a voyage from Hull, Yorkshire to New Orleans, Louisiana, United States.

== 27 February ==
List of shipwrecks: 27 February 1871
Ship	State	Description
Callie Allin	United Kingdom	The brig foundered in the Atlantic Ocean. Her ten crew were rescued by the barque Hyack (United States).
Isabella	United Kingdom	The ship was wrecked on the Colorado Reefs, off the coast of Cuba. She was on a voyage from Jamaica to London.
Matchless	United Kingdom	The brigantine was beached at Cardiff, Glamorgan. She was on a voyage from Cork to Cardiff.
Patriot	United Kingdom	The schooner ran aground on the Gunfleet Sand, in the North Sea off the coast of Essex. She was on a voyage from Sunderland, County Durham to London. She was refloated and assisted in to Harwich, Essex.
Pearl	United Kingdom	The collier ran aground between Brouwershaven and Hellevoetsluis, Zeeland, Netherlands. She was on a voyage from Burntisland, Fife to Rotterdam, South Holland, Netherlands. She was refloated in early March.
Rangelite	New Zealand	The steamship foundered off "Pictouron". All on board were rescued.
Teaser	United Kingdom	The ship sprang a leak and was beached at Dartmouth, Devon. She was on a voyage from London to Swansea, Glamorgan.

== 28 February ==
List of shipwrecks: 28 February 1871
Ship	State	Description
Albert Friedrich	Germany	The ship was wrecked on Spiekeroog. She was on a voyage from Hartlepool, County Durham, United Kingdom to Bremen.
Curraghmore	United Kingdom	The barque sprang a leak and foundered 40 nautical miles (74 km) west north west of Trevose Head, Cornwall. Her crew took to a boat; they were rescued on 2 March by Sauveur (France). Curraghmore was on a voyage from Cardiff, Glamorgan to Palma de Mallorca, Spain.
J. C. Boynton	United States	The ship ran aground at Waterloo, Lancashire, United Kingdom. She was on a voyage from Liverpool, Lancashire to New York. She was refloated in early March.

== Unknown date ==
List of shipwrecks: Unknown date in February 1871
Ship	State	Description
Albania	United Kingdom	The ship ran aground on the Shipwash Sand, in the North Sea off the coast of Suffolk after 9 August. She was on a voyage from Tayport, Fife to Berbice, British Guiana. She was refloated and resumed her voyage.
Amelia	Norway	The barque was abandoned in ice off Kristiansand.
Anna	United Kingdom	The brig was abandoned in the Atlantic Ocean 250 nautical miles (460 km) off Ouessant, Finistère, France. Her crew were rescued by Edgar (United Kingdom).
Annie	United Kingdom	The sloop was wrecked on the Mabonna Rock, in the Grenadine Islands.
Ann Orr	United Kingdom	The ship was wrecked near Whitehaven, Cumberland.
Annette	Netherlands	The schooner was driven ashore at the mouth of the Orinoco River. She was on a voyage from Liverpool, Lancashire, United Kingdom to Ciudad Bolívar, Venezuela.
Atacama	United Kingdom	The ship ran aground at Valparaíso, Chile. She was on a voyage from Hartlepool to Valparaíso. She was refloated.
Berthe et Leontine	France	The ship was driven ashore at Mullion, Cornwall, United Kingdom and was abandoned by her crew. She was on a voyage from Bilbao, Spain to Cardiff.
Blanche	United Kingdom	The sloop was crushed between two vessels and sank at Bristol, Gloucestershire when a steamship ran into one of the vessels she was moored next to. Both crew survived.
Boness	United Kingdom	The ship was driven ashore and wrecked at Donmouth, Aberdeenshire.
Boutry	United Kingdom	The ship was wrecked on the coast of Grand Bassa, Liberia. She was on a voyage from Elmina, Gold Coast to Falmouth, Cornwall.
Calliope	Greece	The brig was wrecked at Yevpatoria, Russia.
Caroline Louise	United Kingdom	The schooner sank at Belfast, County Antrim. She was on a voyage from Troon, Ayrshire to Belfast. She was refloated on 17 February.
Cathina	Flag unknown	The ship was wrecked at Ochotsk, Russia.
C. E. C. G.	United Kingdom	The ship sank at Jersey, Channel Islands.
Charles	United Kingdom	The schooner foundered with the loss of all hands. She was on a voyage from Woodbridge, Suffolk to Boulogne, Pas-de-Calais, France.
Civilta	Italy	The ship was wrecked on "Cervi Island". She was on a voyage from Livorno to Beyrout, Ottoman Syria.
Consort	United Kingdom	The steamship was driven ashore at Ytterøya, Norway. Her crew were rescued. She had been refloated by 17 February and taken in to Trondheim.
Content	United Kingdom	The schooner was driven ashore and wrecked at Benvoy Cove, near Annestown, County Waterford. Her crew were rescued. She was on a voyage from Waterford to Penzance, Cornwall.
Coquette	France	The schooner was wrecked near the Belle Île, Morbihan.
Dageraad	Netherlands	The ship was driven ashore on Madura Island, Netherlands East Indies before 8 February. Her crew were rescued. She was on a voyage from Batavia to Surabaya, Netherlands East Indies.
Diana	United Kingdom	The ship was wrecked on the Rio Grande. She was on a voyage from Paranaguá, Brazil to the River Plate.
Don	United Kingdom	The steamship was wrecked near Amoy, China. Her crew survived. She was on a voyage from Hong Kong to Shanghai.
Edward Jones	United Kingdom	The brigantine was driven ashore and severely damaged near Castletown, Isle of Man. She was on a voyage from Waterford to Newry, County Antrim.
E. L. Cook	United States	The fishing schooner was lost in a gale on the Georges Bank. Lost with all 11 crew.
Eleanor	United Kingdom	The ship was driven ashore at Cardiff.
Eliza Thompson	United Kingdom	The ship was driven ashore on Goat Island. She was on a voyage from Demerara, British Guiana to Newhaven, Sussex.
Ellen	United Kingdom	The ship ran aground at Cardigan. She was on a voyage from Gloucester to Cardigan.
Ellengowan	United Kingdom	The ship was driven ashore near "Griseboain Kloster" before 11 February. She was on a voyage from Alloa, Clackmannanshire to Christiania.
Emanuel	United Kingdom	The ship was destroyed by fire at Oran, Algeria.
Emma	Sweden	The ship sank at Guadeloupe.
Favorita	United Kingdom	The steamship was destroyed by fire at Callao, Peru before 10 February.
Fortuna	Norway	The ship ran aground off Mandal and was wrecked. She was on a voyage from Fredrikstad to Antwerp, Belgium.
Four Sisters	United Kingdom	The ship was wrecked on the Clipper Rock. She was on a voyage from Liverpool to Cardiff.
Franco Pagliano	Italy	The ship was wrecked at Morea, Greece. She was on a voyage from Odesa, Russia to an English port.
Gattshalla	United Kingdom	The ship was driven ashore at Whitby, Yorkshire. She was on a voyage from Sunderland, County Durham to Malta.
Gertrude	United Kingdom	The ship was wrecked on the Isle of Pines, Cuba. She was on a voyage from Liverpool to Mobile, Alabama, United States.
Giano G.	Italy	The barque was driven ashore and wrecked at "Point aux Dies", Pas-de-Calais with the loss of two of her fourteen crew. She was on a voyage from Callao to Dunkirk, Nord, France.
Glencaple	United Kingdom	The ship was driven ashore. She was refloated and taken in to Villareal, Spain.
Golconda	United States	The ship ran aground on the Nantucket Shoals, off the coast of Massachusetts. She was on a voyage from Liberia to Boston, Massachusetts. She was later refloated and resumed her voyage.
Governor	United Kingdom	The ship ran aground on the Banjaard Sand, in the North Sea off the Dutch coast. She was on a voyage from Sunderland to Schiedam, South Holland, Netherlands. She was refloated.
Hansa	United Kingdom	The steamship was driven ashore at Bremen. She was on a voyage from Bremen to New York, United States. She was refloated and resumed her voyage.
Hastrasands Hoffe	United Kingdom	The ship sank off Robin Hoods Bay, Yorkshire.
Hecla	United States	The whaler was wrecked in the Seychelles.
Hellespont	United States	The barque was wrecked 92 nautical miles (170 km) north of the mouth of the Rio Grande. She was on a voyage from the River Plate to New York.
Herschel	Germany	The ship was driven ashore. She was on a voyage from New York to Hamburg. She was refloated and put back to New York.
Hiawatha	United States	The schooner was lost with all 10 hands.
Huanay	Chile	The steamship ran aground at Maule. She was refloated.
Ida	Flag unknown	The ship was wrecked at Ochotsk.
Immacolata	Italy	The ship was driven ashore and wrecked at Missolonghi, Greece.
Industria	Italy	The ship was driven ashore near Algiers, Algeria.
Isabella	United Kingdom	The ship ran aground on the Warden Ledge, off the Isle of Wight. She was on a voyage from Cardiff to London. She was refloated on 8 February.
Isis	United Kingdom	The ship collided with a brig off Gibraltar. She was on a voyage from Martinique to Marseille, Bouches-du-Rhône, France. She was towed in to Gibraltar.
J. Blenkhorn	Belgium	The ship ran aground on the Spykerplaat, off the coast of Zeeland, Netherlands. She was on a voyage from Liverpool to Antwerp.
Jessie	United Kingdom	The ship ran aground on the Dudgeon Sand, in the North Sea. She was refloated and assisted in to Grimsby, Lincolnshire in a leaky condition.
John Chrystal	United Kingdom	The ship ran aground in the New Inlet. She was on a voyage from Pernambuco, Brazil to Philadelphia, Pennsylvania.
Josephine	France	The ship was wrecked near the mouth of the Semani. She was on a voyage from Trieste to Cette, Hérault.
Juanita	United States	The steamship ran aground at Havana, Cuba. She was on a voyage from New Orleans, Louisiana to Philadelphia.
Kate	United Kingdom	The ship was wrecked in the Gut of Canso before 14 February.
Lancefield	United Kingdom	The ship sank at Walsoorden, Zeeland. She was on a voyage from Falmouth to Antwerp.
Margaret Porter	United Kingdom	The schooner departed from Carlingford, County Louth for Havre de Grâce, Seine-Inférieure, France. No further trace, presumed foundered with the loss of all hands.
Marietta D.	Austria-Hungary	The ship was wrecked at "Rismago", north of Zanzibar. She was on a voyage from Trieste to Rismago
Mary Ann	United Kingdom	The sloop was driven ashore at Dunwich, Suffolk. She was refloated and taken in to Southwold, Suffolk.
Mary Ellen	United Kingdom	The ship was wrecked in the Blasket Islands, County Kerry. Her crew were rescued. She was on a voyage from Demerara, British Guiana to Liverpool.
Merenso	United Kingdom	The ship was driven ashore at Waterford. She was on a voyage from Liverpool to "Duggan".
Meta Elizabeth	Germany	The barque was driven ashore at Grenaa, Denmark. She was on a voyage from Newport, Monmouthshire, United Kingdom to Danzig.
Minerva	United Kingdom	The ship ran aground. She was refloated and taken in to Waterford in a leaky condition.
Minerva	United Kingdom	The ship was driven ashore in the Belfast Lough. She was on a voyage from Troon to Dublin. She was refloated and towed in to Belfast.
M. M'Farland	United States	The ship was driven ashore at Sandy Hook, New Jersey. she was on a voyage from New York to Liverpool. She was refloated and put back to New York in a leaky condition.
Montreal	United Kingdom	The ship ran aground on the Newcombe Sand, in the North Sea off the coast of Norfolk. She was on a voyage from Cienfuegos, Cuba to Boston, Lincolnshire.
Olan Cristino	Italy	The ship was wrecked at Gallipoli, Ottoman Empire.
Palmerston	United Kingdom	The ship was driven ashore and wrecked 25 nautical miles (46 km) east of Galle, Ceylon.
Palmyra	United Kingdom	The steamship ran aground off Cape Scalla, Cephalonia, Greece before 14 February. She was on a voyage from Liverpool to Ancona, Italy. She was refloated and taken in to Corfu.
Penniman	Canada	The ship was wrecked at Port Royal, Jamaica. She was on a voyage from Pensacola, Florida, United States to Kingston, Jamaica.
Pera	United Kingdom	The ship ran aground at London. She was on a voyage from Callao to London. She was refloated and docked.
République	France	The ship was lost whilst on a voyage from "Le Marc" to New York.
Revision, and an Unnamed vessel	United Kingdom; Flag unknown	The brigs ran aground on the Cockle Sand, in the North Sea off the coast of Norfolk and sank with the loss of all hands.
Rising Star	United States	The steamship ran aground at Sandy Hook. She was on a voyage from New York to Aspinwall, United States of Colombia. She was refloated and resumed her voyage.
Roseland	United Kingdom	The ship ran aground at Fowey, Cornwall. She was refloated.
Sanguinetti	Flag unknown	The ship was driven ashore at Gallipoli. She was refloated.
Scheldex	Belgium	The ship ran aground near Antwerp. She was refloated.
Schoonderloo	Netherlands	The ship was driven ashore at Brouwershaven, Zeeland She was on a voyage from Java, Netherlands East Indies to Brouwershaven. She was refloated with the assistance of four tugs.
Sergei	Russia	The ship ran aground and was damaged. She was on a voyage from Lisbon to Constantinople, Ottoman Empire. She was refloated and completed her journey.
Shamrock	United Kingdom	The ship, a brig or a tug, was driven ashore at Belfast. She was refloated on 8 February.
Sikh	United Kingdom	The ship was driven ashore in South Bay, County Wexford. She was on a voyage from Glasgow, Renfrewshire to Bombay, India. She was refloated the next day with assistance from the tug Ruby (United Kingdom) and resumed her voyage.
Simon	France	The ship foundered. She was on a voyage from Bône, Algeria to Dunkirk.
Speedaway	United Kingdom	The ship was wrecked at Cárdenas, Cuba before 15 January with the loss of her captain.
Spirit of the North	United Kingdom	The ship was driven ashore at Calicut, India. She was refloated the next day.
Starling	United Kingdom	The ship ran aground on the Maplin Sand, in the North Sea off the coast of Essex. She was refloated.
Thomas Dryden	United Kingdom	The ship ran aground on the Colorados, off the coast of Cuba. She was on a voyage from Newcastle upon Tyne, Northumberland to Havana. She was refloated and completed her voyage.
Thor	Norway	The steamship was abandoned in ice off "Winga". She was on a voyage from Bergen to Gothenburg, Sweden. She was taken in to Gothenburg on 1 March.
Titan	Flag unknown	The steamship was destroyed by fire at Savannah-la-Mar, Jamaica before 6 February.
Trident	United Kingdom	The steamship was driven ashore at Nieuwesluis, Zeeland. She was on a voyage from London to Antwerp. She was refloated and resumed her voyage.
Trois Freres	France	The ship was driven ashore at "Cavoni" and capsized. She was on a voyage from Nantes, Loire-Inférieure to Port of Spain, Trinidad.
Udola	United States	The ship was driven ashore near Barnegat, New Jersey. She was on a voyage from Catania, Sicily, Italy to New York.
Ulster	United Kingdom	The steamship collided with the barque Albert Gallatin (United States) and foundered between 8 and 21 February. Ulster was on a voyage from Dunkirk to Liverpool.
Violet	United Kingdom	The barque was wrecked in the Ryukyu Islands before 15 February. All 72 people on board were rescued. She was on a voyage from Yokohama, Japan to Hong Kong.
Wave	United Kingdom	The ketch was wrecked between 4 and 7 February with the loss of both crew. She was on a voyage from Brixham to Dartmouth, Devon. The wreck was towed in to Dartmouth.
William	United Kingdom	The ship was driven ashore. She was on a voyage from Rye, Sussex to Seaham, County Durham. She was refloated and put back to Rye.
William IV	United Kingdom	The ship ran aground on the Whitford Sands, off the coast of Glamorgan.
