= Nyle =

Nyle may refer to:

- Nyle (given name)
- New York and Lake Erie Railroad, (reporting mark NYLE)

== See also ==
- Nyl River
- Nyl (disambiguation)
- Nile (disambiguation)
