= Nile (disambiguation) =

The Nile, in northeast Africa, is one of the world's longest rivers.

Nile may also refer to:

== Arts and entertainment ==
- Nile (band), an American death metal band
- Nile (TV series), a BBC Television docudrama
- Nile Pharmakeia, a fictional soldier in the Japanese web manga Centuria
- Cleo de Nile, fictional daughter of the mummy from Monster High
- Nefera de Nile, fictional daughter of the mummy from Monster High
- Tana Nile, a fictional character in the Marvel Universe

== People ==
=== Given name ===
- Nile Green (born 1972), historian
- Nile Kinnick (1918–1943), American college football player
- Nile Niami (born 1968), American film producer and real estate developer
- Nile Ranger (born 1991), British footballer
- Nile Rodgers (born 1952), American music producer and guitarist
- Nile Soik (1923–2001), American politician
- Nile Wilson (born 1996), British gymnast

=== Surname ===
- Fred Nile (1934–2026), Australian politician and activist
- Elaine Nile (1936–2011), Australian politician
- Willie Nile (born 1948), American singer and songwriter

=== Stage name ===
- Nile (singer), American hip-hop blues artist Jenée Denenne Grevious (born 1970)

== Places ==
=== Australia ===
- Nile, Tasmania, a town

=== United States ===
- Nile, Missouri, an unincorporated community
- Nile Township, Scioto County, Ohio
- Nile Swim Club, swim club in Yeadon, Pennsylvania
- Nile, Texas, a ghost town
- Nile, Washington, an unincorporated community

== Ships ==
- HMS Nile, various British Royal Navy ships
- Nile (ship), various ships

== Other uses ==
- Nile TV International, an Egyptian television channel
- NILE, NASDAQ code for Blue Nile Inc, an American online jewelry retailer

== See also ==
- Nyle (disambiguation)
- Nyl River, a river in South Africa
- Nyl (disambiguation)
- Shatt en-Nil, a dry river bed in Iraq
- Niles (disambiguation)
