= Niles (name) =

Niles is a surname and a masculine given name which may refer to:

== People ==
=== Surname ===
- Addison Niles (1832–1890), American judge in California
- Blair Niles (1880–1959), American author
- D. T. Niles (1908–1970), Ceylonese pastor, evangelist and president of the Ceylon Methodist Conference
- Dalwin J. Niles (1914–1979), American politician and judge
- David Niles (1888–1952), White House political advisor to Presidents Franklin D. Roosevelt and Harry Truman
- Douglas Niles (born 1954), American fantasy author, game designer and one of the creators of the Dragonlance fantasy world
- Emory T. Niles, United States Army captain, co-author of the Niles and Sutherland Report on conditions in the former Ottoman Empire's eastern provinces after World War I
- Harry Niles (1880–1963), American Major League Baseball player
- Hezekiah Niles (1777–1839), American newspaper editor
- John Milton Niles (1787–1856), American lawyer and politician
- John Jacob Niles (1892–1980), American composer and singer
- John Niles (scholar), American scholar of Old English literature
- Ken Niles, American radio announcer
- Meredith Niles, American environmental scientist
- Mike Niles (born 1955), American former National Basketball Association player and convicted murderer
- Nathaniel Niles (figure skater) (1886–1932), American figure skater and tennis player
- Nathaniel Niles (politician) (1741–1828), United States Representative from Vermont
- Nathaniel Niles Jr. (1791–1869), American diplomat
- Prescott Niles (born 1954), American rock bassist, best known for his work with The Knack
- Richard Niles (born 1951), American composer, arranger, producer, guitarist, broadcaster and journalist
- Russell D. Niles (1902–1992), American lawyer, president of the New York City Bar Association and a dean of New York University School of Law
- Steve Niles (born 1965), American comic book author and novelist
- Thomas M. T. Niles (1939–2025), American diplomat and ambassador
- Wendell Niles (1904–1994), radio announcer
- William Woodruff Niles (1832–1914), Episcopal bishop

=== Given name ===
- Niles Eldredge (born 1943), American biologist and paleontologist
- Niles Fitch (born 2001), American actor
- Niles Paul (born 1989), American National Football League player
- Niles Pease (1838–1921), American businessman and member of the Los Angeles City Council
- Niles Perkins (1919–1971), American athlete and physician
- Niles Scott (born 1995), American football player
- Niles Stephens, American politician
- Niles Welch (1888–1976), American stage and film actor

== Fictional characters ==
- Chief (DC Comics), Dr. Niles Caulder, a paraplegic genius
- Niles Crane, on the US television series Frasier
- Niles Perry, protagonist of The Other (1972 film)
- Niles Standish, in Crank Yankers
- Niles, the butler in the US television series The Nanny (never revealed whether Niles is a given name or surname)
- Judge Niles, in the Judge Dredd comic strip
- Lisa Niles, on the American soap opera General Hospital
- Niles, from the video game Fire Emblem Fates
