= Nile (ship) =

Several vessels have been named Nile either for the Battle of the Nile, or for the Nile river:

== Sailing ships ==
- Nile (1799 ship) was a sailing ship built in 1799 at Howden, England. She made one voyage transporting convicts to New South Wales. For her return trip to Britain she was under contract to the British East India Company (EIC). Thereafter she traded between London and the West Indies, Canada, and the Mediterranean until she stranded on 22 November 1833 on the island of Oesel, Russia.
- Nile (1800 ship) was built in Spain in 1786 and was taken in prize. She first appears in readily accessible British records in 1800. She made three voyages as a slave ship, foundering on her third after having disembarked her slaves.
- Nile (1802 ship) was launched at Nantes in 1795 and was captured or purchased from the French in 1802. She then made four voyages as a slave trader. Between her first and second slave trading voyages she cruised for less than a year as a privateer. With the abolition of British participation in the trans-Atlantic slave trade in 1807, Nile became a regular merchantman, but now trading with Africa. She was sold in Barbados in 1811.

== Steam ships ==
- SS Nile (1850), sank off Godrevy Head, Cornwall in 1854
- SS Nile (1919), later SS Empire Blanda, torpedoed in 1941

== See also ==
- HMS Nile – any one of three vessels of the British Royal Navy
- Hired armed cutter Nile
- Hired armed lugger Nile
