= North Yemeni League =

The North Yemeni League or the Yemen Arab Republic Football League, was the professional association football league held for domestic football clubs in North Yemen, held between 1978 and 1990. The league folded when South and North Yemen unified as one country (Yemen) on 22 May 1990. This resulted in the creation of the Yemeni League.

Al-Ahli are the most successful team, with four league titles in the North Yemeni League. The North Yemen Cup of the Republic was the league's domestic cup.

== Title winners ==
- 1978/79 - Al-Wahda
- 1979/80 - Al-Zuhra
- 1980/81 - Al-Ahli
- 1981/82 - Al-Shaab
- 1982/83 Al-Ahli
- 1983/84 Al-Ahli
- 1985/86 Al-Shorta
- 1987/88 Al-Ahli
- 1988/89 Al-Yarmouk
- 1989/90 Al-Yarmouk
