= River Hayle =

River in west Cornwall, England

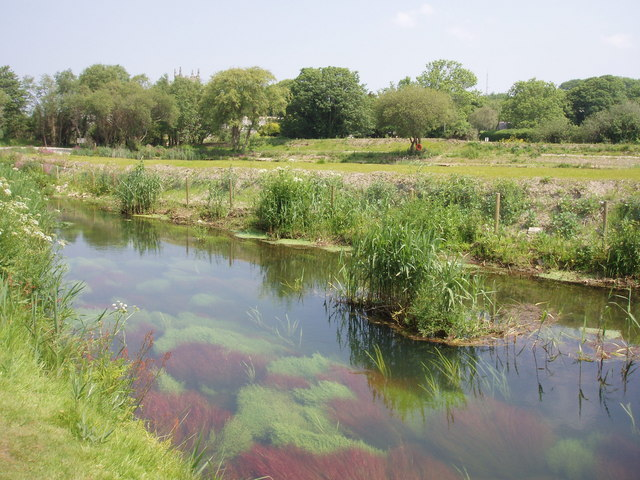
- River Hayle near St Erth

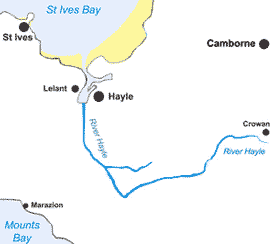
- Map of the course of the River Hayle

Location
- Country: United Kingdom
- Region: Cornwall

Physical characteristics
- Source
  - location: Crowan
  - coordinates: 50°9′25.2″N 5°16′58.8″W
- Mouth: Hayle Estuary
  - location: Hayle, St Ives Bay
  - coordinates: 50°11′31″N 5°26′6″W

The River Hayle (Cornish: Heyl, meaning estuary) is a small river in West Cornwall, England, United Kingdom which issues into St Ives Bay at Hayle on Cornwall's Atlantic coast.

The River Hayle is approximately 12 miles (19 kilometres) long and it rises south-west of Crowan village. Its course is west for approximately 5 miles (which brings the river to within 3 miles of the south coast at Marazion on Mount's Bay). It then flows through a steep wooded valley north of the granite high ground at Trescowe Common, formerly a mining area, before turning abruptly north near the hamlet of Relubbus. It then follows a northerly course for the remaining six miles to the estuary, passing St Erth.

The Hayle Estuary encompasses a disused port on the east bank and a substantial area of salt marsh named Lelant Saltings to the west. The port was once of considerable importance to Hayle's industry (see main article Hayle). Lelant Saltings is an important habitat for birds and the Royal Society for the Protection of Birds runs a nature reserve there. Areas around the estuary are designated as sites of special scientific interest (see also Hayle SSSI).

== River Hayle location information ==
- Mouth: Coordinates 50.192°N 5.435°W; grid reference SW 548 382
- Relubbus (major change of course): Coordinates 50.134°N 5.401°W; grid ref. SW 570 315
- Source: Coordinates 50.157°N 5.283°W; grid ref. SW 656 338
