= Hayle Estuary and Carrack Gladden SSSI =

Protected area in Cornwall, England

Hayle Estuary and Carrack Gladden
- Site of Special Scientific Interest
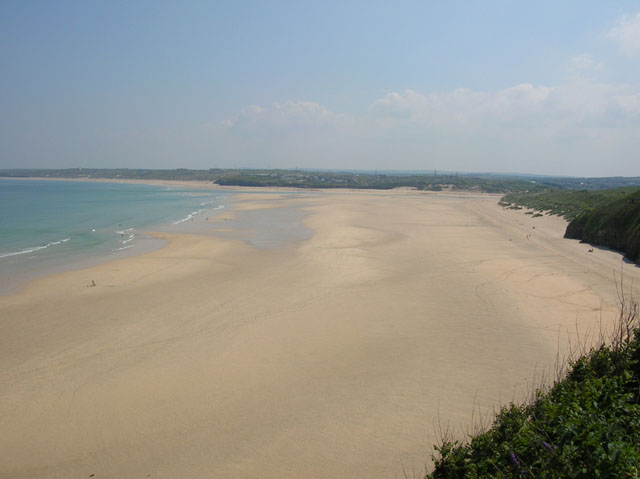
- Porth Kidney Sands

- Location within Cornwall Location within England
- Location of Hayle Estuary and Carrack Gladden.
- Coordinates: 50.192°N 5.435°W
- Interest: Biological
- Area: 191.8 hectares (1.918 km^{2}; 0.7405 sq mi)
- Notification date: 1951

The Hayle Estuary and Carrack Gladden SSSI is a Site of Special Scientific Interest, noted for its biological interest, in west Cornwall, England, UK. It consists of three distinct parts, each of which is covered in a separate article: the Hayle Estuary, the sand-dune system of Porth Kidney Sands and the coastal headland at Carrack Gladden.

== Geography ==
Hayle Estuary and Carrack Gladden SSSI is on the southern shore of St Ives Bay and to the west of the town of Hayle. The estuary of the River Hayle is the most south-westerly in Britain and adjacent to important bird migration routes which cross the Land's End peninsula. Part of the estuary, at Ryan's Field and Carnsew Pool, is owned by the Royal Society for the Protection of Birds (RSPB). Two long distant footpaths transverse or are close to the boundary of the SSSI. The South West Coast Path follows the coast from Carrack Gladden to North Quay, Hayle, while St Michael’s Way also follows the coast at Carrack Gladden as far as Griggs Quay. The St Ives Bay Line also follows part of the boundary.

== Birdlife ==
As the Hayle Estuary is the most south westerly in Britain it is important for wintering wildfowl, waders and gulls as well as for vagrants from North America. The most numerous ducks on the estuary are Eurasian teal and Eurasian wigeon, with a few gadwall and smaller numbers of common goldeneye and red-breasted mergansers. Waders in winter include some red knot, spotted redshank, common greenshank and common sandpiper among the more common species. Little egret are also present. In passage times the numbers of waders increase and North American vagrant species are recorded with some regularity, the most frequent being pectoral sandpiper, white-rumped sandpiper and long-billed dowitcher.

=== Industry ===
Hawke's Point Mine (also known as Wheal Fanny Adela) was in operation between 1851 and 1870, producing 670 tons of copper, 1 ton of ochre and some tin. The main workings were at Carrack Gladden and tunnels can still be seen from the beach. The workings at Hawke's Point was reopened in 1883, employing nineteen men. An old adit narrowly missed a copper lode and cobalt was also found. ″Mine materials, Machinery and Effects″ were sold by auction on 31 October 1884. Lots included a 40 feet (12 m) long wood-built house with galvanised iron roof, horse-whim, portable forge, stone crusher, etc.
