= Godrevy Lighthouse =

Lighthouse in Cornwall, England

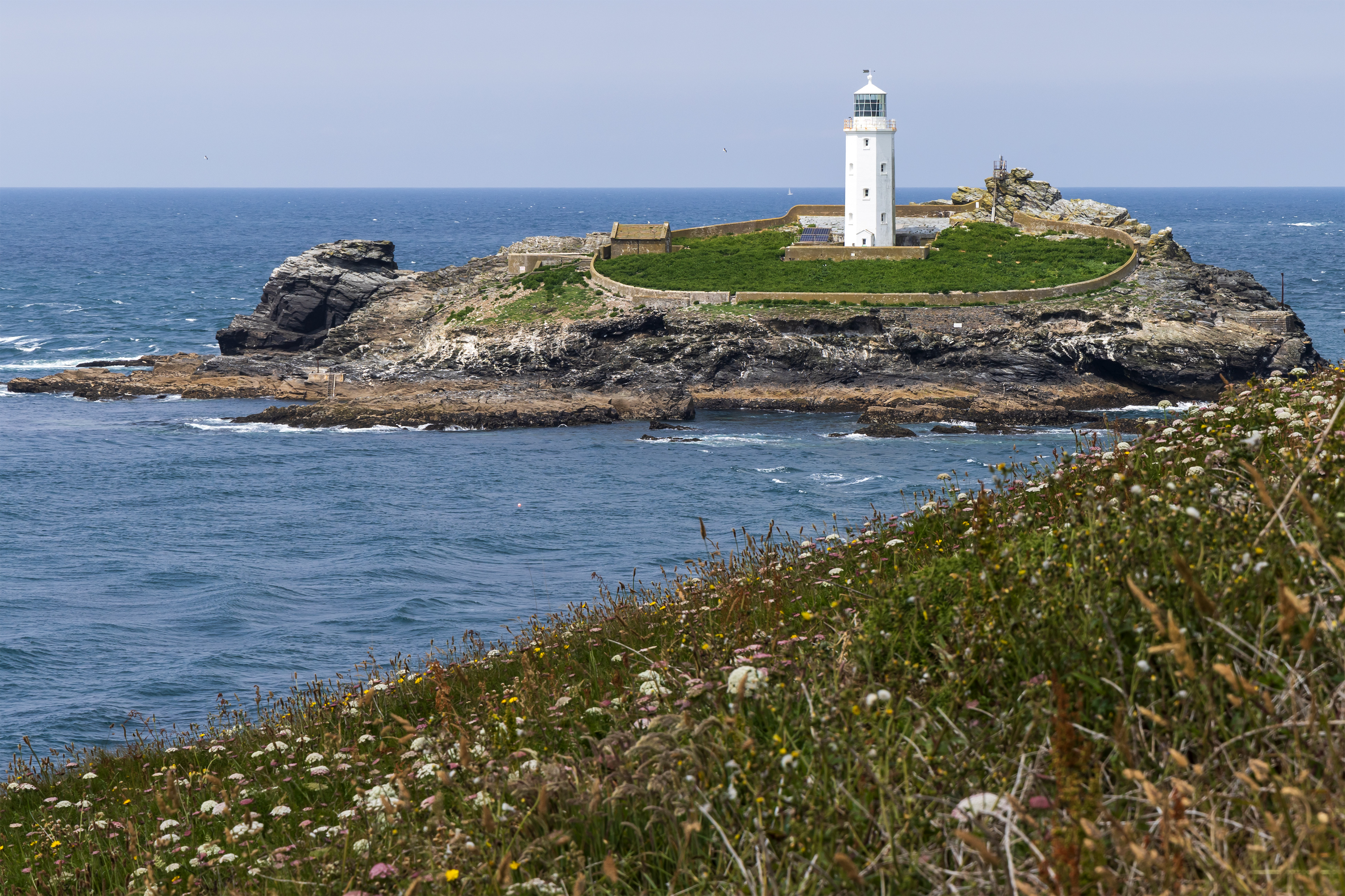
- Godrevy Island and Lighthouse
- Location: Near Camborne; Cornwall; England
- OS grid: SW5765943589
- Coordinates: 50°14′33″N 5°24′1″W

Tower
- Constructed: 1 March 1859 (first)
- Built by: James Walker
- Construction: rubble, stone and mortar
- Automated: 9 August 1939
- Height: 26 m (85 ft) (first)
- Shape: octagonal tower with balcony and lantern
- Markings: white tower and lantern
- Operator: Trinity House
- Heritage: Grade II listed building

Light
- First lit: 2012 (current)
- Deactivated: 2012 (first)
- Focal height: 37 m (121 ft) (first); 28 metres (92 ft) (current)
- Lens: 2nd Order 700 MM Fixed Optic With Red Sector (original), 2 x marine LED sector lights (current)
- Intensity: white: 4,370 candela (first) red: 817 candela (first); 495 candela (current)
- Range: white 12 nmi (22 km) (first) red 8 nmi (15 km) (first); 8 nmi (15 km) (current)
- Characteristic: Fl WR 10s

Listed Building – Grade II
- Official name: Godrevy Lighthouse, including Keepers' cottages, store front courtyard walls and perimeter walls
- Designated: 14 January 1988
- Reference no.: 1327597

Godrevy Lighthouse (Cornish: Golowji Godrevi) was built in 1858–1859 on Godrevy Island in St Ives Bay, Cornwall. Standing approximately 300 metres (980 ft) off Godrevy Head, it marks the Stones reef, which has been a hazard to shipping for centuries.

== History ==
The Stones claimed many ships, prompting calls for a lighthouse to be built, but nothing came of plans until the wreck of the iron screw steamer SS Nile during a storm on 30 November 1854. All of her passengers and crew, numbering about 40 people in total, were lost.

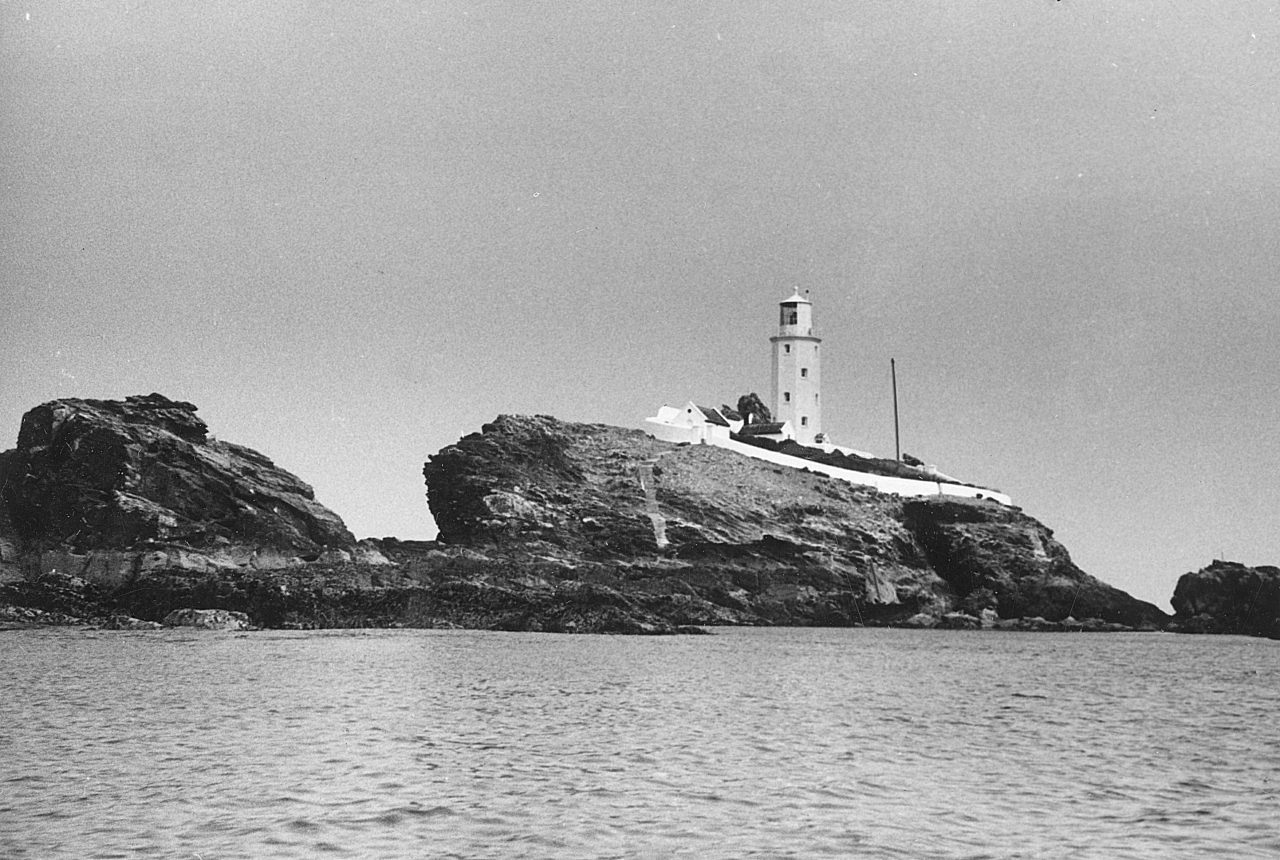
The lighthouse in 1949.

The disaster prompted fresh calls for a light to be built. Richard Short, a St Ives master mariner, wrote to the Shipping and Mercantile Gazette the day after the news of the sinking broke to note: "[H]ad there been a light on Godrevy Island, which the inhabitants of this town have often applied for, it would no doubt have been the means of warning the ill-fated ship of the dangerous rocks she was approaching. Many applications have been made from time to time concerning the erection of a light to warn mariners against this dangerous reef, but it has never been attended to, and to that account may be attributed the destruction of hundreds of lives and a mass of property ... scarcely a month passes by in the winter season without some vessel striking on these rocks, and hundreds of poor fellows have perished there in dark dreary nights without one being left to tell the tale."

Further, though less lethal, accidents followed, prompting a local clergyman, the Rev. J.W. Murray of Hayle, to start a petition to Trinity House to build a lighthouse on the island. The petitioners were informed in October 1856 that Trinity House had agreed to build the Godrevy Lighthouse. By December 1857, James Sutcliffe had been appointed as the engineer for the project, with James Walker contracted to design the lighthouse. Its construction took around a year at a cost of £7,082 15s 12d and the light began operating on 1 March 1859.

== Description ==
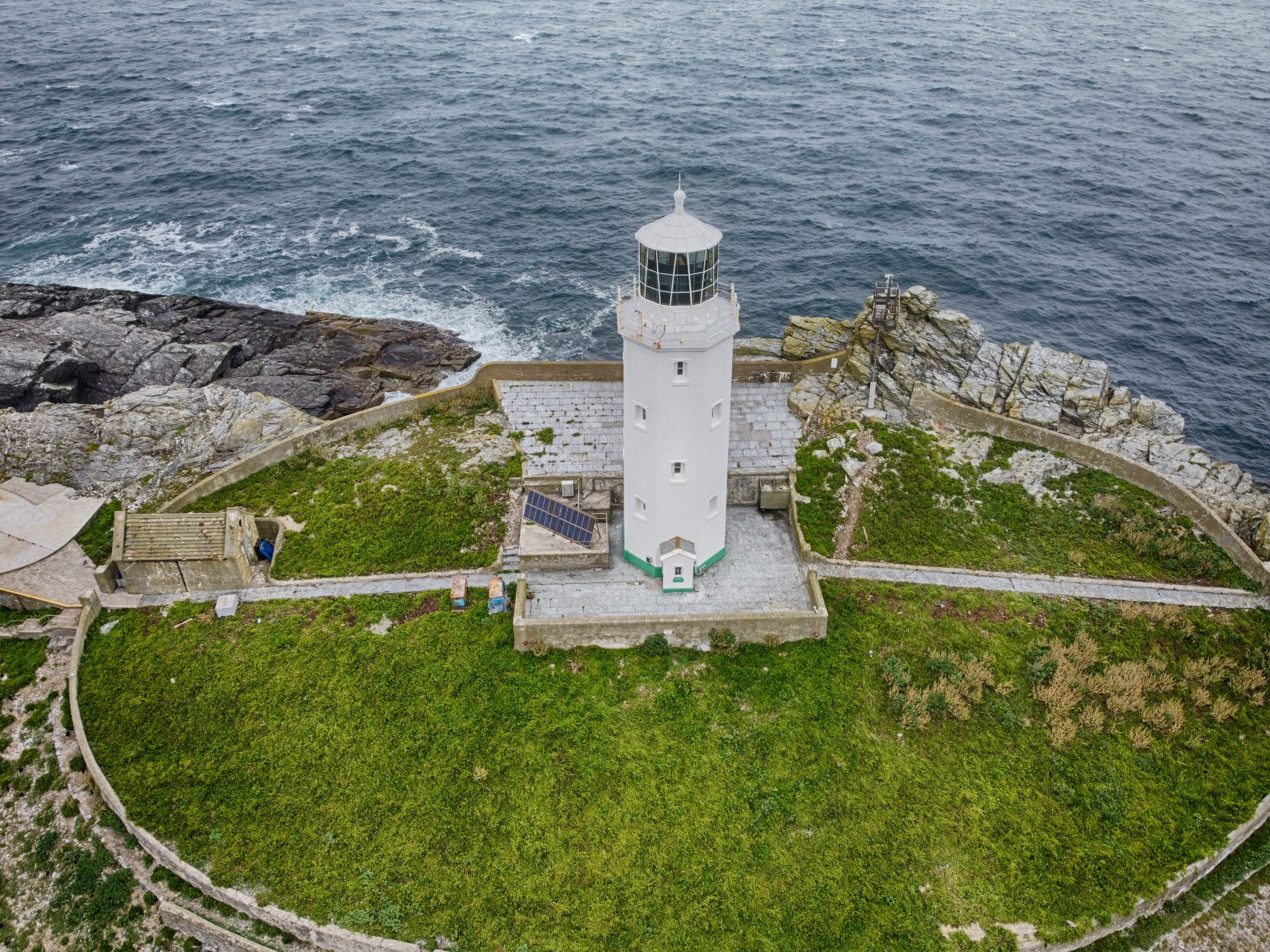
Aerial view of the lighthouse in its compound

The lighthouse is a white octagonal tower, 86 feet (26 m) high and made of rubble stone bedded in mortar. It is situated almost in the centre of the island and was originally provided with cottages for the keepers. The first light was an oil lamp within a large (first-order) revolving catadioptric optic by Henri Lepaute of Paris, which flashed white every ten seconds; it consisted of 24 Fresnel lens panels with multiple rows of reflecting prisms above and below. There was also a fixed red light below the main light, which could be seen over a 45-degree arc of danger from the reef. The main light's rotation was powered by a clockwork motor, driven by a large weight that descended down a cavity in the wall of the tower. The lights had a range of 17 and 15 miles respectively. A fog bell was also provided,. which sounded once every five seconds.

Initially, the lighthouse was staffed by two keepers at a time, working two months on and one month off, but landing keepers by boat was always a perilous activity at Godrevy and in 1933 the lighthouse was automated: a new second-order fixed catadioptric lens was installed together with an acetylene burner activated by a sun valve; the new light had a flashing characteristic and a red sector was incorporated which replaced the subsidiary red light. The fog bell was deactivated at the same time. By 1939 the keepers had been withdrawn and their cottages were subsequently demolished.

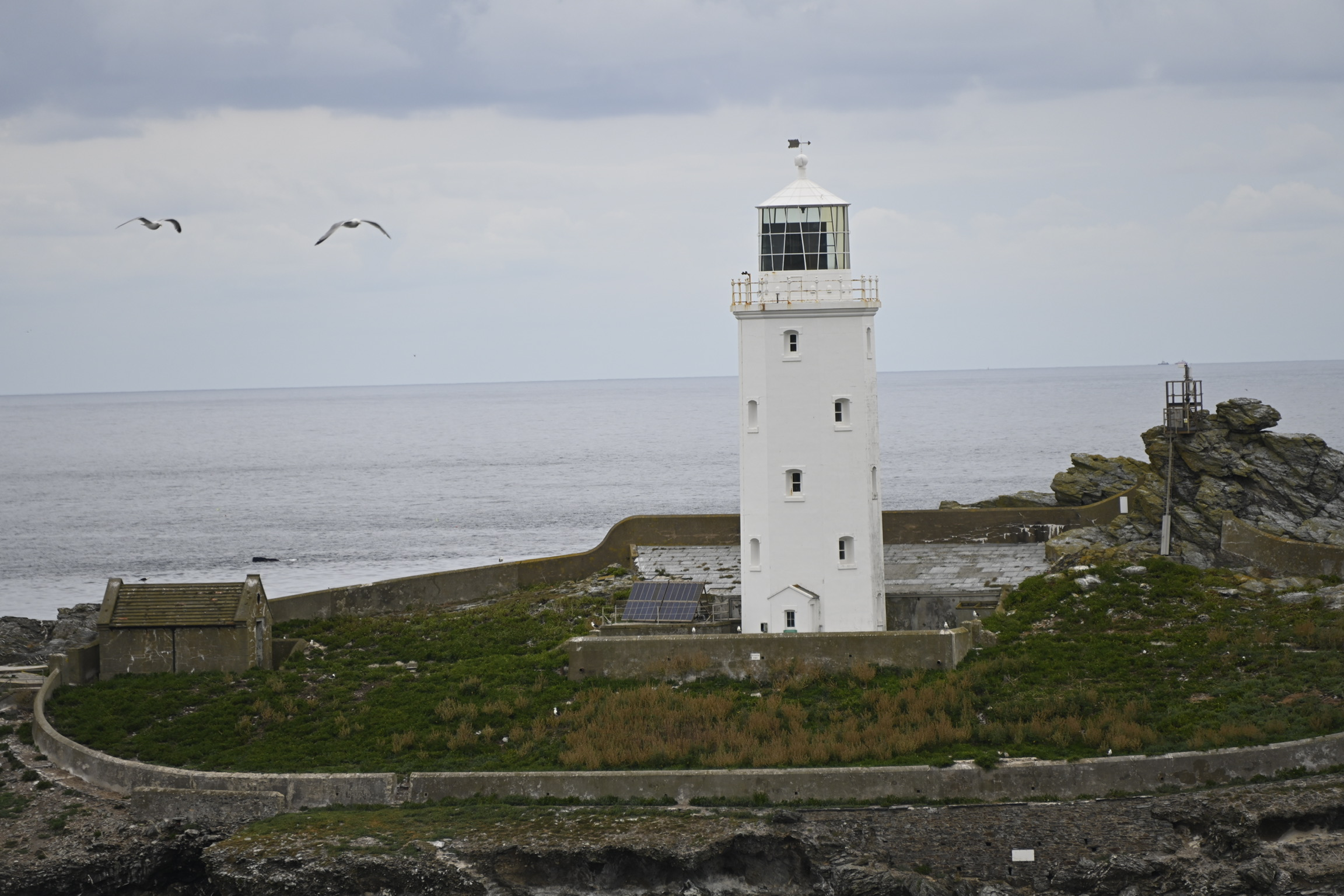
The lighthouse in 2022; the light is currently shown from the platform on the rock to the right of the tower.

In 1995, the lighthouse was modernised and converted to solar powered operation. In 2012 Trinity House discontinued use of the light within the tower, replacing it with an LED light mounted on a steel platform nearby on the rocks. Godrevy is still listed by Trinity House as a lighthouse, and the tower is maintained by them as a daymark. The new light maintains the same pattern as its predecessor, flashing white/red every ten seconds, with the red sector only being visible in the arc of danger from the reef. The range of the light is around 8 nautical miles (15 km).

Godrevy Light by Charles Thomas and Jessica Mann describes the history of this lighthouse and shows the many works of art it inspired. One of those whom the lighthouse is said to have inspired was Virginia Woolf, author of To the Lighthouse – although she locates the lighthouse in the Hebrides. She first visited on 12 September 1892, signing the visitors' book, as did the pre–Raphaelite painter William Holman Hunt who was in the same party. The lighthouse's visitors' book, containing the signature of Virginia Stephen (Woolf), was sold at auction at Bonhams on 22 November 2011 for £10,250.

== See also ==
- List of lighthouses in England
