= Hayle Estuary =

Estuary in Cornwall, England

- Heyl (Cornish)
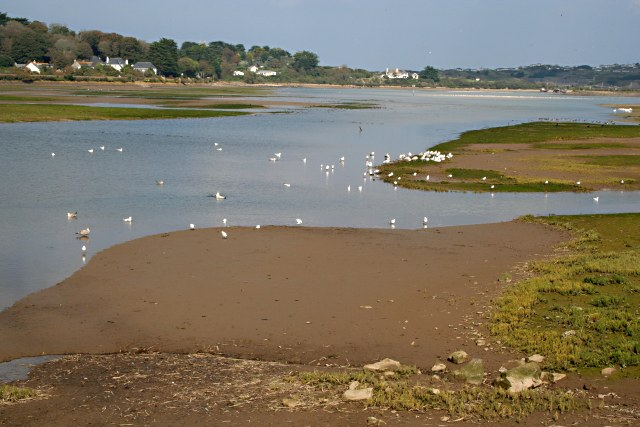
- Looking towards Lelant from the causeway

- Location in Cornwall
- Location: Hayle, Cornwall
- Coordinates: 50.192°N 5.435°W
- River sources: Angarrack and Hayle
- Primary outflows: St Ives Bay
- Designation: Site of Special Scientific Interest (SSSI)

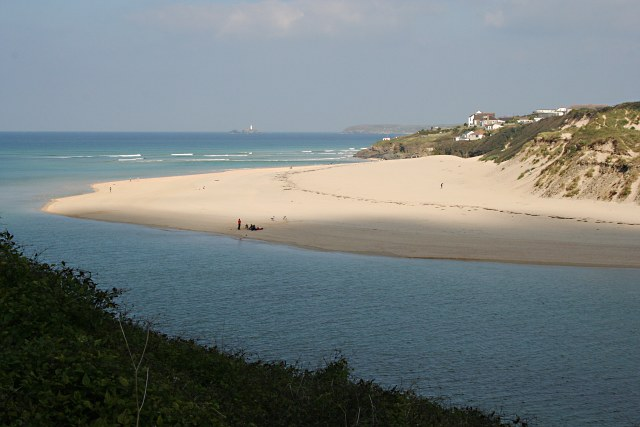
Hayle Towans from Lelant Towans

The Hayle Estuary (Cornish: Heyl, meaning estuary) is an estuary in west Cornwall, England, United Kingdom. It is one of the few natural harbours on the north coast of south-west England and during the prehistoric and early medieval periods was important for trade and the movement of people and ideas.

The estuary of the River Hayle consists of a main channel, with several other nearby tidal areas, including Lelant Saltings, Copperhouse Creek (Cornish: Est Logh, meaning eastern inlet) and Carnsew Pool (also known as Carnsew Basin). It is included in the Hayle Estuary and Carrack Gladden Site of Special Scientific Interest. The Royal Society for the Protection of Birds manages a nature reserve at the site.

== History ==
Due to the estuary being one of the few natural harbours on the north coast of south-west England, it was important for trade and the movement of people and ideas. A hillfort, overlooks the estuary at Carnsew, and dates from the later prehistoric period. Prehistoric artifacts with Irish connections have been found around the estuary, and in the early medieval period some of the earliest post-Roman evidence for Christianity in Cornwall, which also had strong Irish influences. Set into the lower slope of the hillfort is an early-Christian memorial stone known as the ″Cunaide Stone″, which was discovered in 1843. Research on the inscription suggests it dates to the 5th-century AD, has European inspiration and the name is possibly Irish in origin. Religion and trade continued during the early medieval period with pilgrimages to St Michael's Mount and European shrines, but trade declined during the later medieval period when the estuary became choked by silt due to tin extraction up river.

The Cornish Copper Company moved to Hayle in 1757 and built a copper smelting works the following year on the eastern part of the estuary, on what is now known as Copperhouse Pool. Access to the open sea was difficult and one of the earliest surviving industrial buildings in Hayle. a canal and dock, was completed in 1769. Harvey's Foundry was established in 1779 at the head of Penpol Creek by John Harvey to serve local mines. Harvey's built South Quay in 1819 which increased silting in shipping channels; a problem initially resolved by impounding Copperhouse Pool. Carnsew Pool was created in 1834 to impound tidal water, following the building of East Quay by the Cornish Copper Company, which caused the deep water channels used by Harvey's to fill with silt. The sides of Carnsew Pool are built of rubble and slag, and New Pier was also built, to direct water through sluices, into the estuary; thus flushing silt out of the river channel adjacent to Harvey's foundry. The complex system maintained the port facilities which allowed the two competing foundries to increase their national and international roles. As well as building steam engines, Harvey's developed their business with overseas exports, shipbuilding and ship-breaking. Harvey's fleet of 79 ships built at Hayle including the 4000 ton SS Ramleh in 1891; the largest ship to be built in Cornwall.

The two rival companies were responsible for the development of Hayle into a major industrial port in the 18th and 19th-centuries, servicing the tin and copper mining industry of West Cornwall. About 1811, Sea Lane (or Black Road) was built across Copperhouse Creek to further improve access between the works at Copperhouse and the company's main shipping facilities at North Quay. The buildings around the creek was mostly built from blocks of slag, called scoria; waste material from the smelter, providing a distinctive building material. Hence the name ″Black Road″.

=== Transport ===
In 1825 an Act of Parliament established the Hayle Bridge Causeway and Turnpike Trust which was required to construct a bridge, causeway and turnpike over the Hayle River from Griggs Quay (grid reference SW545363) in the west to Phillack in the east. The turnpike was needed to ease the transport of copper ore to the port at Hayle for export. A second Act was passed in 1837 to establish the Griggs Quay to Penzance Turnpike and in 1839 an Act formed a third trust, the Hayle and Redruth Turnpike to complete the turnpike to Redruth. The running of the turnpike was overseen by the winner of a public auction. For the year 1880, the winning bid was £591 10s. In 1885 the management of the causeway by the turnpike came to an end and the White house (tollhouse) on the eastern end, along with the garden and three granite posts was put up for auction on 30 October 1885.

The Hayle Railway was built in the 1830s, as a single-track for the movement of minerals from the mines at Camborne and Redruth. Its western terminal was at Penpol (under the viaduct of the current railway), followed part of the northern shore of Copperhouse Pool and then via an inclined plane at Angarrack, on to Redruth.

== See also ==
- Port of Hayle
- Hayle
- St Ives Bay
