= Carrack Gladden =

Coastal headland in Cornwall, England

Coordinates: 50.198°N 5.455°W

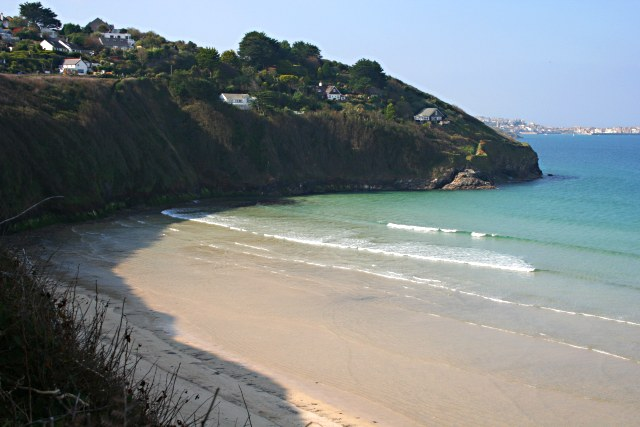
Carrack Gladden

Carrack Gladden (Cornish: Karrek Gladn, meaning rock on a bank) is a coastal headland in St Ives Bay at the eastern end of Carbis Bay beach between Hayle and St Ives in west Cornwall.

The cliffs between Carrack Gladden headland and Hawks Point to the east are of metamorphosed Devonian slates and rise to 60 metres (200 ft) high.

The acidic soils exhibit a range of vegetation types including maritime heathland, grassland and scrub. The heath and grassland habitats at the headland itself support the nationally scarce Soft-leaved Sedge Carex montana. On the steep, wet cliffs to the east, two other nationally scarce plant species Ivy Broomrape (Orobanche hederae) and Maidenhair Fern (Adiantum capillus-veneris) are found.

The site has been included by English Nature within a Site of Special Scientific Interest called the Hayle Estuary and Carrack Gladden SSSI in recognition of its biodiversity conservation importance.
