= North Yemen Cup of the Republic =

The North Yemen Cup of the Republic was an association football competition run by the Yemen Football Association (YFA). It was played between 1977 until 1984.

== Finals ==
| Season | Winner |
|---|---|
| 1978 | Al-Wahda (San'a') |
| 1979 | Al Zuhra (San'a') |
| 1980 | Al-Ahli (San'a') |
| 1981 | Al Sha'ab Ibb |
| 1982 | Al-Ahli (San'a') |
| 1983 | Al-Ahli (San'a') |
| 1984 | Al-Ahli (San'a') |
