= St Ives Bay =

Bay on the north coast of Cornwall, England

Coordinates: 50°13′N 5°26′W

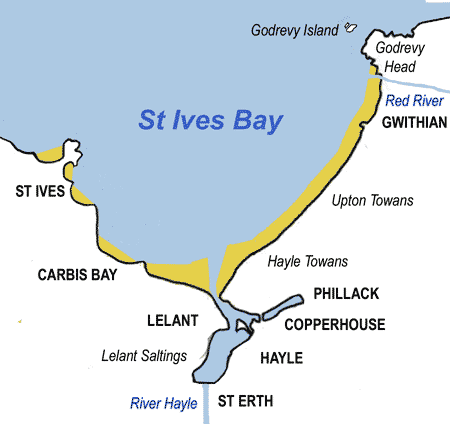
Sketch map of St Ives Bay

St Ives Bay (Cornish: Roda Ia, meaning "Ia's anchorage") is a bay on the Atlantic coast of north-west Cornwall, England, United Kingdom. It is in the form of a shallow crescent, some 4 miles or 6 km across, between St Ives in the west and Godrevy Head in the east.

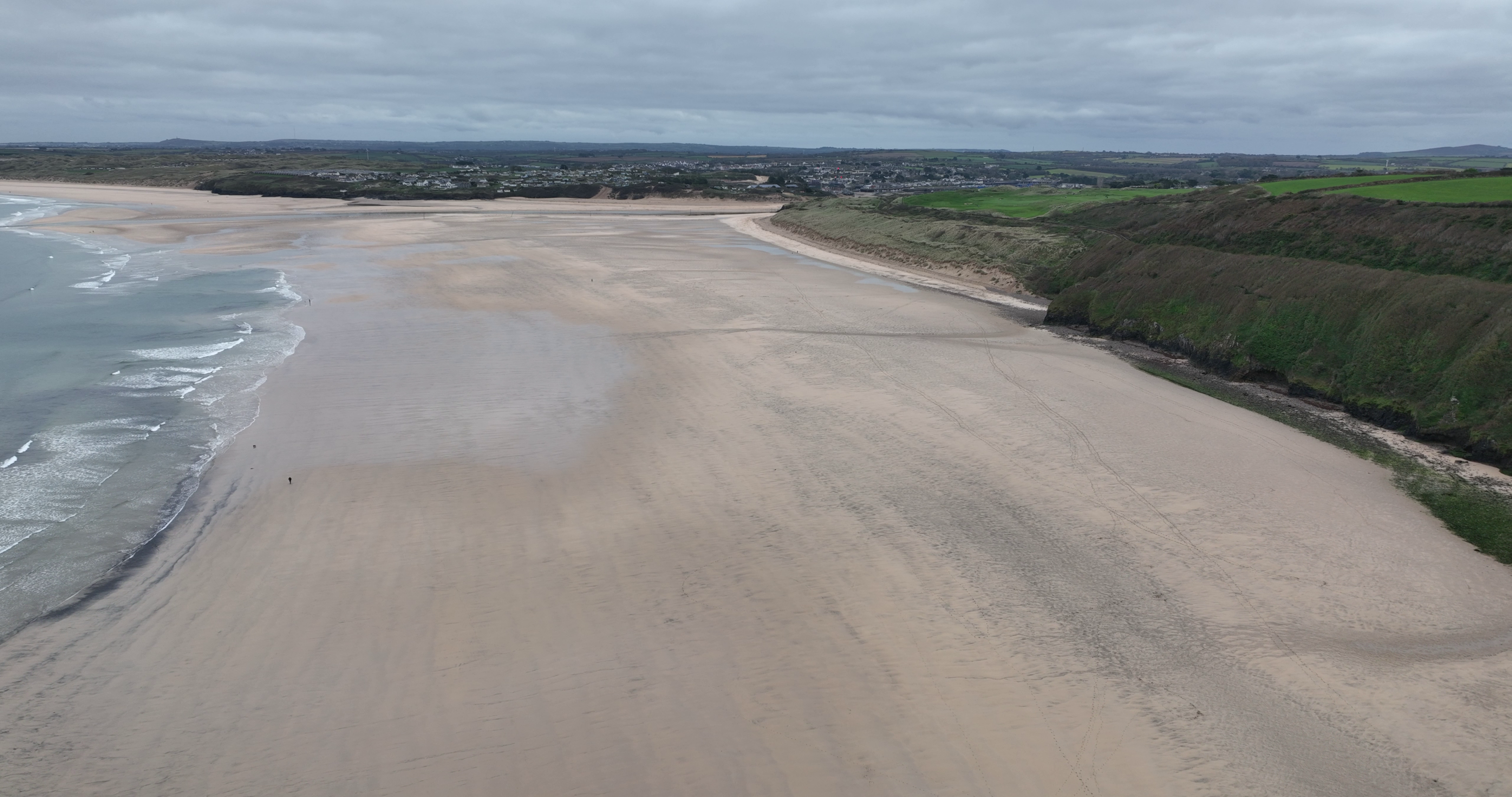
Aerial view of Porth Kidney Sands beach and coastline, Cornwall, England.

At the most southerly point of St Ives Bay, the River Hayle flows into the sea through sand dunes and across the beach. Behind the dunes, the river forms a broad tidal estuary which includes an area of salt marsh and a largely disused port (see article on the industrial history of Hayle). The estuary is a popular place for birdwatching and the Royal Society for the Protection of Birds maintains a reserve there.

The eastern coast of the bay is a three-mile (5 km) unbroken sandy beach backed by a substantial system of coastal dunes known as The Towans which stretches from Porth Kidney Sands in the west to Godrevy Head in the east. This stretch of beach is popular for surfing, particularly in the Gwithian area.

The western side of the bay is on higher ground and is more densely inhabited with substantial settlements at Lelant, Carbis Bay and St Ives. The western coast of the bay is rockier with several small beaches separated by headlands.

The Stones reef lies about one mile north-west of Godrevy Head and presents a hazard to navigation - the lighthouse on Godrevy Island warns mariners of the danger. Inshore hazards include the strong tidal stream around Godrevy Island and the tidal current at the mouth of the River Hayle.

== Transport and access ==
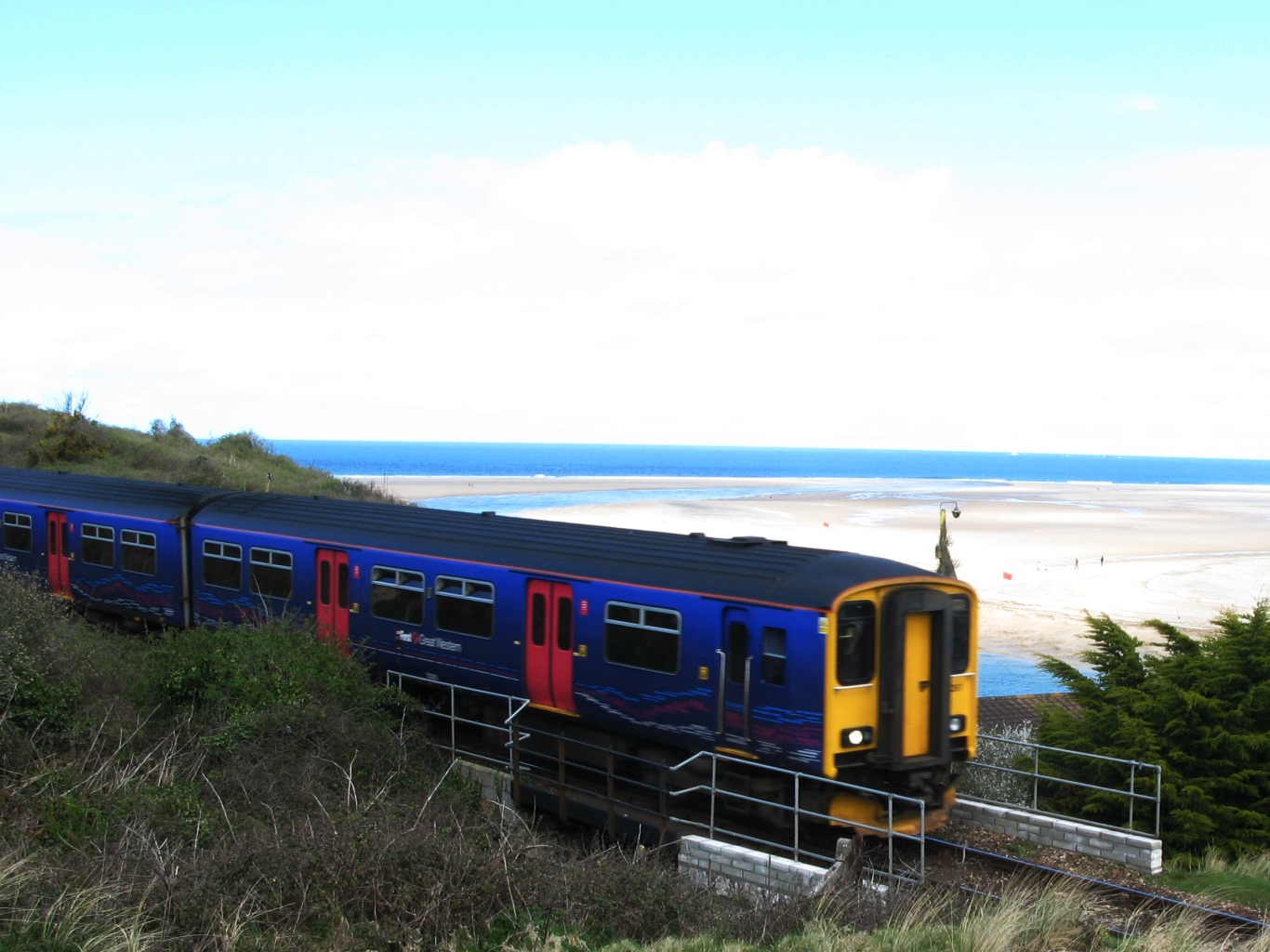
The St Ives Bay Line

By rail: The Penzance to Plymouth Cornish Main Line railway passes south of the bay with stations at St Erth and Hayle and a branch, the St Ives Bay Line, runs from St Erth to St Ives.

By road: The B3301 coast road runs from Godrevy to Hayle behind the dunes, with many points of access to the coast. The A30 trunk road passes south of Hayle.

On foot: The South West Coast Path follows the coast around St Ives Bay although it makes a detour inland around the Hayle estuary.

== Places around St Ives Bay ==
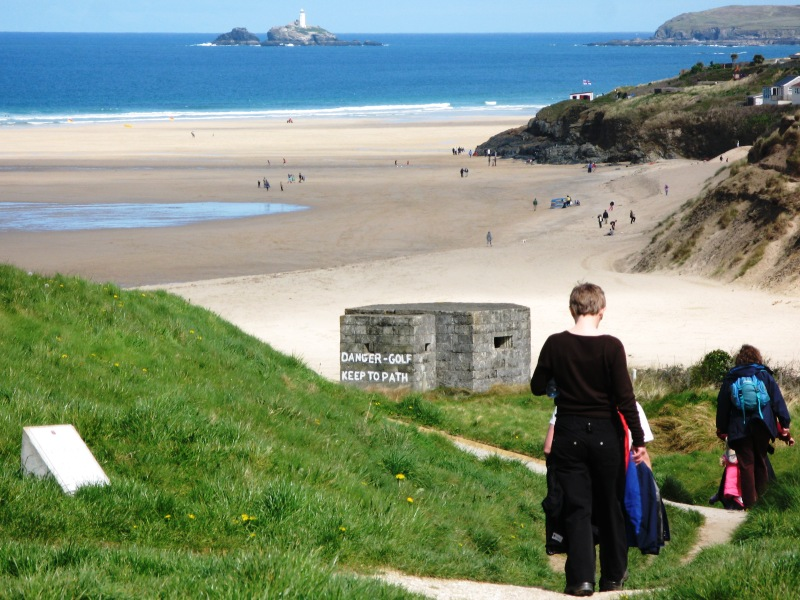
The South West Coast Path overlooking St Ives Bay

Towns and villages

- Carbis Bay
- Connor Downs
- Gwithian
- Hayle
- Lelant
- Phillack
- St Erth
- St Ives

Rivers

- The Red River
- River Hayle

Other features

- Hayle Towans
- Godrevy Head
- Godrevy Lighthouse
- Hayle estuary Site of Special Scientific Interest
