= Justice Niles =

Justice Niles may refer to:

- Addison Niles (1832–1890), associate justice of the Supreme Court of California
- Nathaniel Niles (politician) (1741–1828), associate justice of the Vermont Supreme Court
- Silas Niles (1718–1774), associate justice of the Rhode Island Supreme Court
