= Meredith Niles =

American environmental scientist and academic

Meredith Teresa Niles
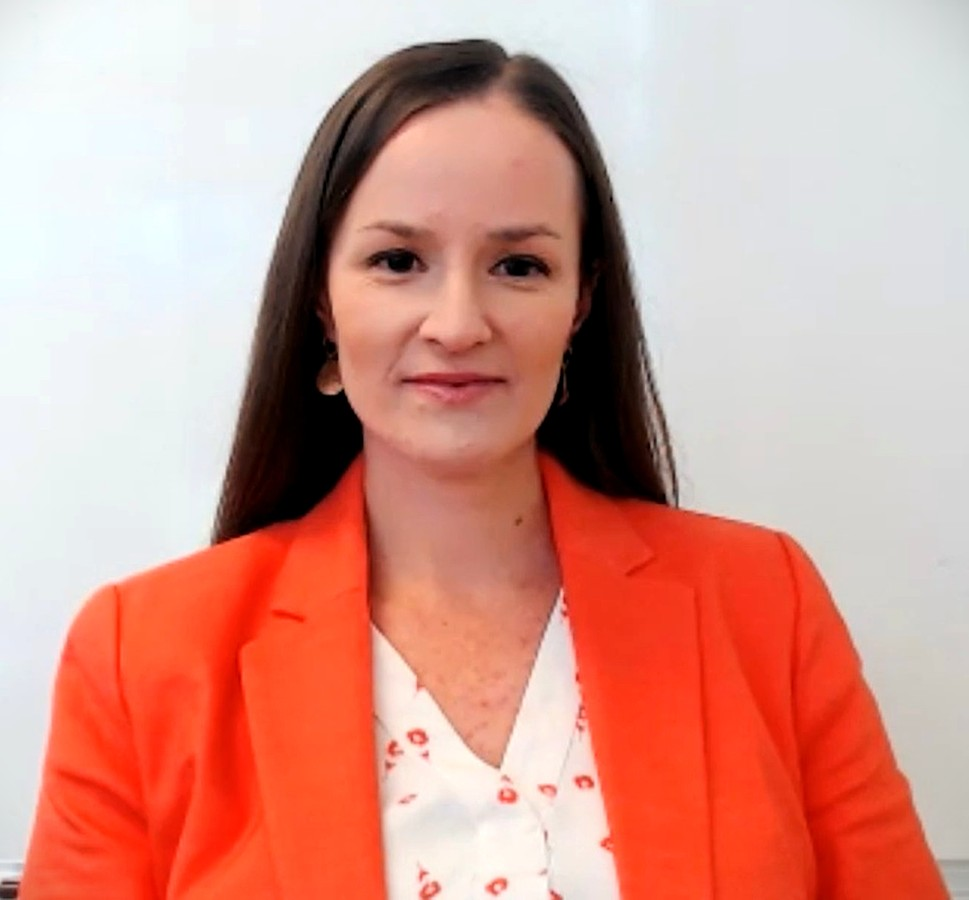
- Niles in 2023
- Education: University of California, Davis; Catholic University of America
- Scientific career
- Workplaces: University of Vermont; Brown University; United States Department of State
- Thesis: Agricultural innovation for climate change mitigation and adaptation : a comparison of New Zealand and California farmers and policies (2014)

Meredith T. Niles is an American environmental scientist who is the Robert L. Bickford Endowed Professor at the University of Vermont. In 2022, she was named the National Academy of Medicine Emerging Leader in Health and Medicine Scholar.

== Early life and education ==
Niles is from Maryland. She was an undergraduate student in politics and environmental studies at Catholic University of America. She moved to the University of California for her doctoral research, where she worked in ecology and agricultural innovation. She was a postdoctoral researcher at the Harvard University Kennedy School of Government, where studied climate smart agriculture.

== Research and career ==
Niles worked for the United States Department of State in the Office of the Global AIDS Coordinator, contributing to the President's Emergency Plan for AIDS Relief.

Her research has addressed food systems and sustainable agriculture, particularly how farmers adapt to climate change and the barriers to adopting sustainable practices.

She is the founding director of the National Food Access and COVID Research Team (NFACT), a collaboration monitoring the pandemic's impact on diet and nutritional security.

== Awards and honors ==
- 2010 American Institute of Biological Sciences Emerging Public Policy Leadership Award
- 2022 National Academy of Medicine Emerging Leader in Health and Medicine Scholar
- 2024 University of Vermont Vogelmann Research Award

== Selected publications ==
- Meredith T Niles; Farryl Bertmann; Emily H Belarmino; Thomas Wentworth; Erin Biehl; Roni Neff (15 July 2020). "The Early Food Insecurity Impacts of COVID-19". Nutrients. 12 (7). doi:10.3390/nu12072096. ISSN 2072-6643. PMID 32679788. Wikidata Q97565073.
- Zach Conrad; Meredith T Niles; Deborah A Neher; Eric D Roy; Nicole E Tichenor; Lisa Jahns (18 April 2018). "Relationship between food waste, diet quality, and environmental sustainability". PLOS One. 13 (4) e0195405. doi:10.1371/journal.pone.0195405. ISSN 1932-6203. PMC 5905889. PMID 29668732. Wikidata Q52580530.
- Van R Haden; Meredith T Niles; Mark Lubell; Joshua Perlman; Louise E Jackson (26 December 2012). "Global and local concerns: what attitudes and beliefs motivate farmers to mitigate and adapt to climate change?". PLOS One. 7 (12) e52882. Bibcode:2012PLoSO...752882H. doi:10.1371/journal.pone.0052882. ISSN 1932-6203. PMC 3530505. PMID 23300805. Wikidata Q28710211.
