= National Youth League =

National Youth League may refer to:

== Politics ==
- National Youth League (Indian National League), youth section of the Indian National League political party
- National League of Sweden, also known as the National Youth League of Sweden

== Sport ==
- Gillette National Youth League, a British rugby league football competition
- National Youth Competition (rugby league), an Australasian rugby league football competition
- The former name of the Y-League, an Australian soccer competition
- National Youth League (New Zealand), a football (soccer) competition
