= Niles Township =

Niles Township may refer to the following places in the United States:

- Niles Township, Cook County, Illinois
- Niles Township, Delaware County, Indiana
- Niles Township, Floyd County, Iowa
- Niles Charter Township, Michigan

== See also ==
- Nile Township, Scioto County, Ohio
