= Nyle (given name) =

Nyle is a given name. Notable people with the given name include:

- Nyle DiMarco (born 1989), American model and actor
- Nyle Godsmark (born 1992), Scottish rugby union player
- Nyle McFarlane (1935–1986), American football player
- Nyle Salmans, American football coach
- Nyle Wiren (born 1973), American football player
- Nyle Wolfe (born 1971), American singer

== See also ==
- Nyles Lannon (born 1977), American musician
- Jewel De'Nyle, American actress
