= SS Empire Blanda =

World War II merchant ship of the United Kingdom

History
- Name: Nile (1919-33); Sokol (1933-39); Rio Grande (1939-40); Empire Blanda (1940-41)
- Owner: Nile Steamship Co Ltd (1919-30); Jugoslovenska Plovidba DD (1930-39); Compagnia Panamena de Vapores Ltda (1939-40); Ministry of War Transport (1940-41)
- Operator: Glen & Co (1919-30); Jugoslovenska Plovidba DD (1930-39); Compagnia Panamena de Vapores (1939-40); Larrinaga Steamship Co Ltd (1940-41)
- Port of registry: (United Kingdom of Great Britain and Ireland) Glasgow (1919-22); (United Kingdom) Glasgow (1922-30); (Kingdom of Yugoslavia) Susak (1930-39); Panama City (1939-40); (United Kingdom) London (1940-41)
- Builder: Lithgows Ltd, Port Glasgow
- Yard number: 715
- Launched: 30 September 1919
- Completed: November 1919
- Out of service: 19 February 1941
- Identification: UK Official Number 141932 (1919-30, 1940-41); Code Letters KOWS (1930-33); Code Letters HPKQ (1939-40); Code Letters GLXW (1940-41)
- Fate: Torpedoed and sunk, 19 February 1941

General characteristics
- Tonnage: 5,693 GRT; 1,658 NRT
- Length: 423 ft 5 in (129.06 m)
- Beam: 56 ft (17.07 m)
- Depth: 28 ft 7 in (8.71 m)
- Propulsion: Triple expansion steam engine
- Speed: 11 knots (20 km/h)
- Crew: 37 plus 3 DEMS gunners (Empire Blanda)

Empire Blanda was a cargo ship that Lithgows Ltd, Port Glasgow built in 1919 as Nile. It was sold to a Yugoslavian company in 1930 and renamed Sokol in 1933, serving until 1939 when it was sold to a Panamanian company and renamed Rio Grande. In 1940, the Ministry of War Transport (MoWT) requisitioned Nile, which was renamed Empire Blanda. On 19 February 1941 U-69 torpedoed Nile, sinking it.

== Description ==
The ship was a 5,593 GRT cargo ship. It was built by Lithgows Ltd, Port Glasgow, as yard number 715. The ship was launched as Nile on 30 September 1919 and completed in November. It was 423 feet 5 inches (129.06 m) long, with a beam of 56 feet (17.07 m) and a depth of 28 feet 7 inches (8.71 m). The ship was powered by a triple expansion steam engine which had cylinders of 27 inches (69 cm), 45 inches (110 cm) and 75 inches (190 cm) diameter by 48 inches (120 cm) stroke. It was manufactured by J G Kincaird Ltd, Greenock. The ship could make 11 knots (20 km/h).

== Career ==
Nile was owned by the Nile Steamship Co Ltd and operated under the management of Glen & Co Ltd. Its port of registry was Glasgow. In 1930, Nile was sold to Jugoslovenska Plovidba DD, Susak. It was renamed Sokol in 1933.

In 1939, Sokol was sold to Compagnia Panamena de Vapores Ltda and renamed Rio Grande. It was operated under the management of T & N Coumantaros Ltd, Greece. In June 1940, Rio Grande sailed from Bermuda to Halifax, Nova Scotia to join Convoy HX 51, which arrived at Liverpool on 2 July. It was carrying a cargo of lumber and sulphur. On arrival, Rio Grande was requisitioned by the MoWT and renamed Empire Blanda. It was operated under the management of the Larrinaga Steamship Co Ltd. Its port of registry was London.

Convoy HX 107 departed Halifax on 3 February 1941 and was to arrive at Liverpool on 28 February. Empire Blanda was carrying a cargo of steel, bound for Glasgow. At 08:18 on 19 February 1941, Empire Blanda was torpedoed and sunk by U-69 south of Iceland with the loss of all 37 crew and three DEMS gunners, having straggled from the convoy. Those lost on Empire Blanda are commemorated at the Tower Hill Memorial, London.

== Official Numbers and Code Letters ==
Official Numbers were a forerunner to IMO Numbers. Nile and Empire Blanda had the UK Official Number 141931.

Nile used the Code Letters KOWS from 1930. Rio Grande used the Code Letters HPKQ Empire Blanda used the Code Letters GLXW.
