= SS Nile (1850) =

1850 British iron-hulled cargo steamship

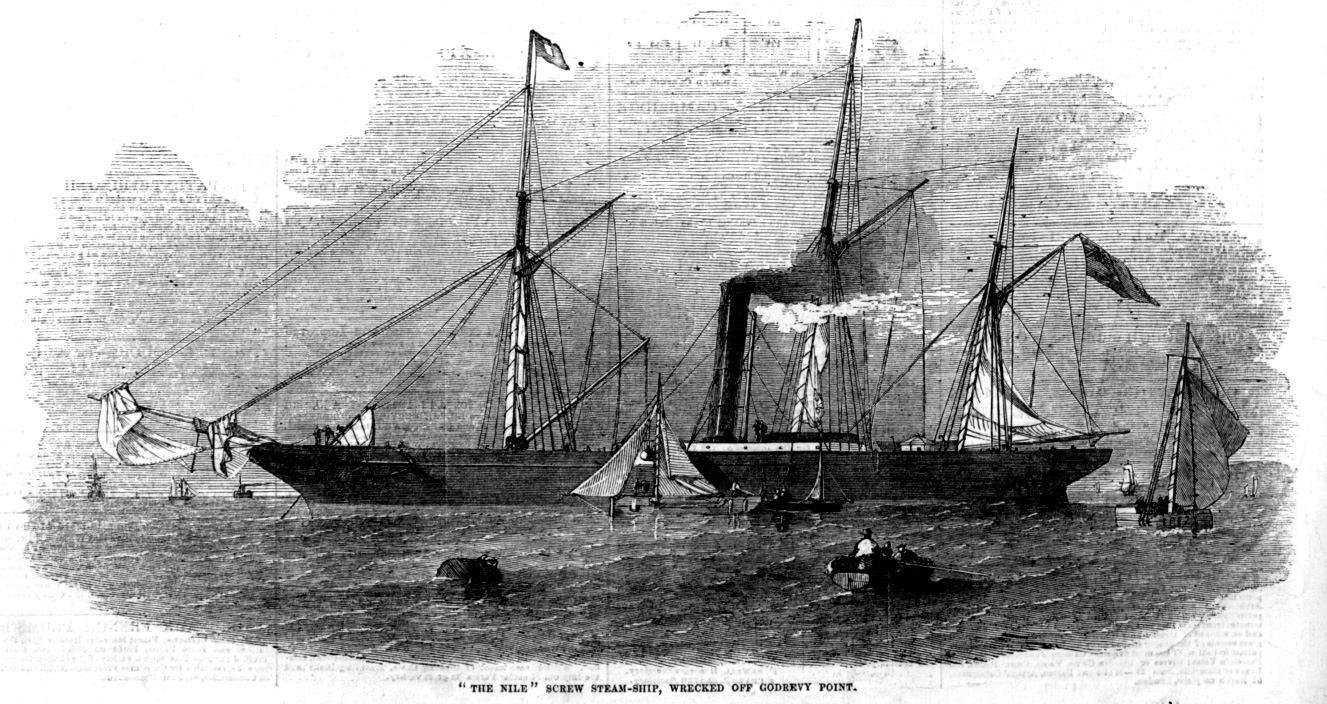
- SS Nile

History
- Name: Nile
- Owner: William M Moss, William J Lamport and George Holt Jr (1850–53); James Stirling (1853–54)
- Operator: Moss Line (1850–53); British and Irish Steam Packet Co (1853–54)
- Port of registry: (United Kingdom of Great Britain and Ireland) Liverpool (1850–53), Dublin (1853–54)
- Builder: Alexander Denny, Dumbarton
- Yard number: 15
- Launched: 1850
- Fate: Struck The Stones off Godrevy Head and sank with all hands, 30 November 1854

General characteristics
- Tonnage: 525 GRT; 1,347 NRT
- Length: 162.2 ft (49.44 m)
- Beam: 25.3 ft (7.71 m)
- Depth: 15.4 ft (4.69 m)
- Propulsion: Benjamin Hick & Son Two-cylinder single-screw engine, 150 nhp
- Speed: 10.5 knots (19.4 km/h)
- Crew: 24 crew and about 16 passengers

The SS Nile was an iron-hulled cargo steamship. She is best remembered for her sinking in bad weather on 30 November 1854 with the loss of all hands, most likely after colliding with The Stones, a notoriously dangerous reef off Godrevy Head in Cornwall.

== Construction and use ==
The Nile, an iron-hulled screw steamer, was built at Dumbarton in 1850. She was first operated by the Moss Line of Liverpool and inaugurated the line's Mediterranean service. In 1853 her ownership passed to James Stirling of Dublin and her operations to the British and Irish Steam Packet Company.

== Loss ==
On her last voyage, Nile was travelling from Liverpool to London, calling at Penzance, Falmouth, Plymouth and Portsmouth en route. She was carrying a cargo of heavy merchandise and could also accommodate passengers at low rates, though due to the late time of year few people would have taken such a roundabout route. She had been due to leave Liverpool on Sunday 26 November but due to bad weather had to delay her journey for two days. She left Liverpool on the evening of Tuesday 28 November and was last seen about 40 miles (64 km) from the Longships Lighthouse on the evening of 30 November, making her way through rough seas and high winds.

The following day, a ship sailing from Hayle to Penzance spotted oil floating on the water. Later on 1 December it became apparent that an accident had overtaken the Nile when papers addressed to the captain, spars, empty casks and other debris were washed ashore at Portreath. The ship's stern was spotted a day or two later and several bodies, five of which were female, were washed ashore at Tehidy. One of them was identified as the stewardess of the Nile.

== Cause and casualties of the disaster ==
The cause of the disaster was not definitively established. It is likely that the captain, W.F. Moppett of Dublin, drifted off course by about 18 to 20 miles in the bad weather, resulting in the ship hitting The Stones. The Nile may have managed to back away from the rocks but foundered in 12 to 14 fathoms of water. Those aboard were either unable to escape due to the ship's rapid disintegration or were overwhelmed by the waves when they tried to launch the lifeboats. The ship was thought to have struck the rocks around 2 or 3 am shortly after the flood tide, judging by the disposition of the wreckage in St Ives Bay.

There were about 24 crew aboard, consisting of the captain, two mates, a steward and stewardess, carpenter, boatswain, 18 engineers, stokers and sailors. The number of passengers was unclear. Several missed the ship's departure due to its late exit from Liverpool. One man had a fortunate escape when he spent too long drinking ashore with a friend and missed the ship's departure. He hurried on to Bristol via another steamer and travelled overland to Hayle to catch up with the Nile so that he could be reunited with his luggage, which was still aboard, but found on arriving that he had lost his luggage but saved his life. Another man arrived at the ship just as the bridge to the deck was being removed and offered a shilling to a porter to replace it, but was refused; he thus missed the departure and unknowingly escaped the shipwreck. The value of the Nile was estimated at around £40,000 to £50,000 (around £3.2 million to £4 million in 2013 prices) and was almost fully insured, but much of the cargo – mainly goods from Manchester despatched to drapers at Penzance, Truro and Falmouth – was uninsured and the consignees suffered heavy losses as a result of the sinking.

== Aftermath ==
The sinking prompted complaints that nothing had been done to address the long-standing risks that The Stones posed to shipping. Richard Short, a St Ives master mariner, wrote to the Shipping and Mercantile Gazette the day after the news of the sinking broke to note: "[H]ad there been a light on Godrevy Island, which the inhabitants of this town have often applied for, it would not doubt have been the means of warning the ill-fated ship of the dangerous rocks she was approaching. Many applications have been made from time to time concerning the erection of a light to warn mariners against this dangerous reef, but it has never been attended to, and to that account may be attributed the destruction of hundreds of lives and a mass of property ... Scarcely a month passes by in the winter season without some vessel striking on these rocks, and hundreds of poor fellows have perished there in dark dreary nights without one being left to tell the tale."

Further though less lethal accidents followed, prompting a local clergyman, the Rev. J.W. Murray of Hayle, to start a petition to Trinity House to build a lighthouse on the island. The petitioners were informed in October 1856 that Trinity House had agreed to build the Godrevy Lighthouse, which began operating in 1859.
