= Gwinear =

Gwinear may refer to:

- Gwinear, Cornwall, a village in the United Kingdom, named for the saint
- Gwinear Downs, a village in the parish of Crowan, Cornwall
- Gwinear-Gwithian, the civil parish which includes the village of Gwinear
- Gwinear Road, a disused railway station
- Saint Gwinear, a Cornish saint
- St Gwinear’s Church, Gwinear, the parish church
