= The Towans =

Sand dunes in Cornwall, England

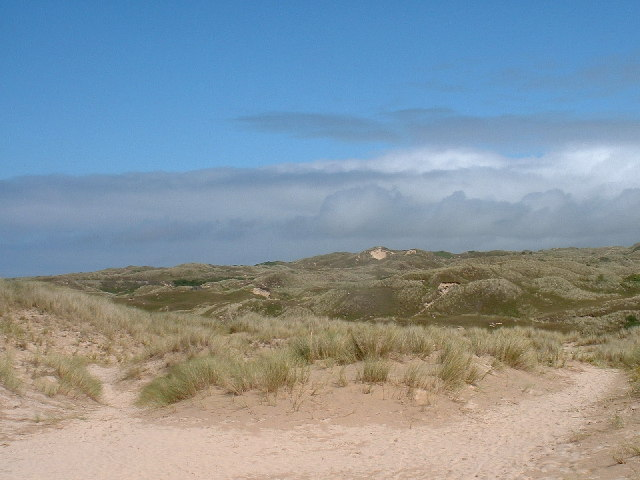
Typical dunes scenery near Upton Towans

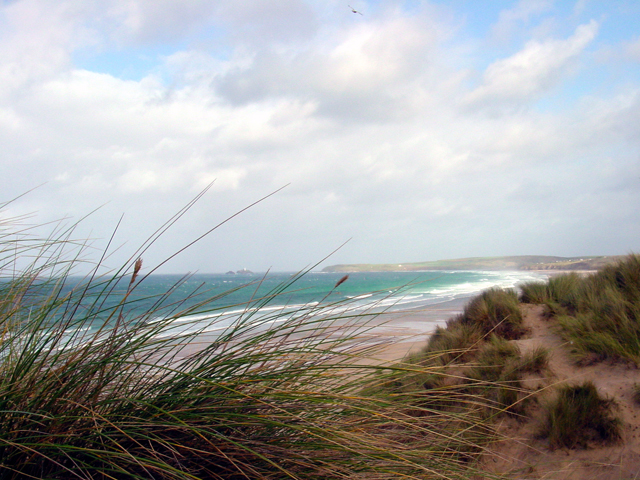
Looking north from Phillack Towans towards Godrevy

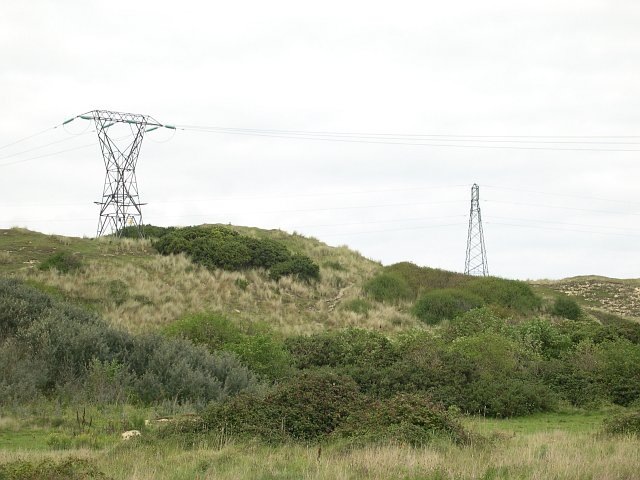
Power lines near Upton Towans

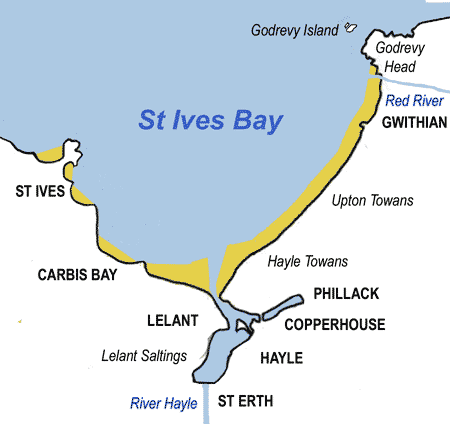
Sketchmap showing The Towans in relation to St Ives Bay

Towan (from Cornish: Tewyn, meaning "sand dune") is found in many placenames in Cornwall (Porthtowan for example). However, The Towans usually refers to the three-mile (5 km) stretch of coastal dunes which extends north-east from the estuary of the River Hayle (at 50.19256°N 5.43111°W) to Gwithian beach (at 50.22991°N 5.39145°W) with a midpoint near Upton (at 50.21053°N 5.40768°W). The South West Coast Path crosses the towans.

== Geography ==
The Towans are bounded to the south-east by Phillack village and the B3301 Hayle to Portreath road; to the north-west, the dunes face St Ives Bay across an intertidal beach. Substantial areas of The Towans rise more than 50 metres (160 ft) above sea level, the highest point being 72 metres (236 ft) at Phillack Towans. The southern half of The Towans is in Hayle civil parish and the northern half in Gwinear-Gwithian civil parish. The southern half was in Phillack parish until 1935 when Phillack was absorbed into the parish of Hayle.

Although 'The Towans' refers to the whole stretch, individual areas of the dunes have their own identities. Those named by Ordnance Survey on its mapping are (from south-west to north-east) Lelant Towans, Hayle Towans, Riviere Towans, Mexico Towans, Common Towans, Phillack Towans, Upton Towans and Gwithian Towans.

== Gwithian to Mexico Towans SSSI ==
Much of the area falls within the Gwithian to Mexico Towans SSSI (Site of Special Scientific Interest), noted for both its geological and biological interest. Two areas of the site are also Local Nature Reserves. Upton Towans is owned by the Cornwall Wildlife Trust. It is a habitat of sand dune and grassland suited to a variety of wildlife and plants including the pyramidal orchid, glow worm, silver-studded blue butterfly, and skylark. Species in Gwithian Towans Local Nature Reserve include skylarks and adders.

== Archaeology ==
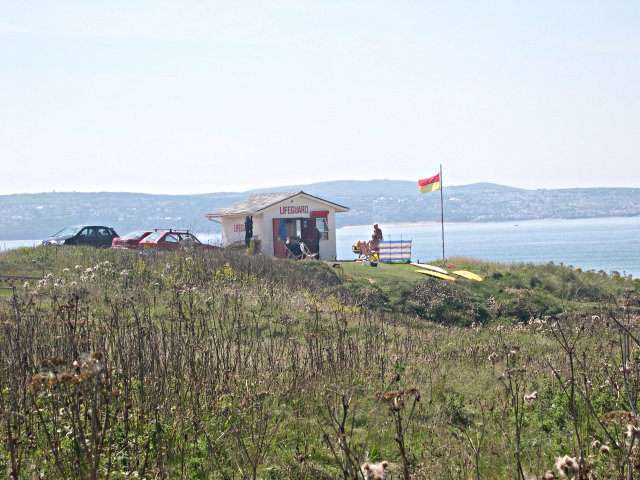
The lifeguard station on Gwithian Towans

Gwithian Towans cover the site of a Bronze Age farm which has been excavated although no remains are visible.

== History ==
=== Agriculture ===
Upton Town was previously known as Great Towan, which contained an arable farm known as Upton Barton, and included a large area of towan grazing. At an uncertain date, sometime after 1650 the farmhouse was buried overnight with sand, following the frontal collapse of a high sand dune; the occupants escaped through the upper windows. The remains have not been since the winter of 1808–09. The evidence for Upton Barton was lost with the bombing of the Ordnance Survey, in Southampton during World War II.

In 1879 the Reverend F Hockin, rector of Phillack, enclosed approximately 9 acres (3.6 ha) for tillage giving employment to a large number of unemployed men. A large area of the Towans was already grazed.

Riviere Farm was put out to tender in 1888, containing a farm house, 88 acres (36 ha) of pasture and arable land and 90 acres (36 ha) acres of Common Towans ″within a ring fence″.

=== Mining ===
There have been a number of small mines on the towans, the most westerly was Wheal Lucy on the Black Cliff (grid reference SW558389) and now built over with chalets. The sett was known as Riviere Consols or Riviere Mine and adits were driven inland from the cliff and the Carbona Lode was worked over 70 fathoms. A 4 fathom shaft was sunk on the lode and a ″rock of tin weighing 7 cwt″ was said to have been raised. The mine was abandoned because of a lack of funds to purchase an engine. A new company was formed In 1871 and the sett renamed Wheal Lucy, after the daughter of Canon Hockin who owned the mineral rights. Over £5,000 was spent on machinery and dressing floors and £765 worth of tin was sold in the early months of the mine. The mine closed in 1874 having returned 14 tons of black tin for £1,202. The mine was reworked from 1893–96, at a time when the price of tin was low and another heavy loss was made.

To the east of Phillack Churchyard a shaft was sunk to 10 or 15 feet on one of the small north-south lead lodes. The results from Wheal Cupola (grid reference SW568387) were inconclusive. Wheal Dream was known to have been in existence in 1770 and is believed to be the Loggans Mine. In 1851 the Mining Journal reported that the Wheal Luggan (grid reference SW574391) lead lodes had recently been ″very productive″. A small shaft was sunk and an adit dug for 400 yards northwards from Loggans Moor (grid reference SW575390), along the Phillack/Gwithian parish boundary to intersect a large copper lode. A series of shafts follow the boundary.

Nearby, on Upton Towans, was Boiling Well Mine (grid reference SW578397) which closed soon after 1815. In 1819 the sett was renamed Wheal Boil and a shaft sunk between two lead lodes. The mine was abandoned in 1821 due to the 36 inch cylinder engine being unable to cope with flooding. In the 1830s the mine there was either a proposal or it was reopened, and in May 1836, offered for sale under the name Wheal Rice. The mine was known as North Wheal Alfred under a fresh lease in 1852 and soon after reverted to its old name of Boiling Well. The mine continued until 1862 producing 3,906 tons of copper ore, 459 tons of lead ore, 54 tons of blende and 5,000 ounces of silver. The mine had a poor reputation with the saying ″on boiling mine payday″, meaning never. Locally the mine was later occupied by the Dynamite Works and part is now a caravan park.

On the low cliffs to the west of Gwithian and adjacent to Strap Rocks, is a mine called Wheal Emily (grid reference SW580415) which re-opened in 1857. In that year 40 tons of good quality copper was produced. The following year 20 tons of galena was sold at £20 per ton and the mine also produced blende. The mine closed in April 1860 losing over £2000 in its final year. Wheal Liverpool was within a five-minute walk of the coast and Gwithian church, although its exact site is unknown. The mine is mentioned in a letter dated 30 April 1823, requesting Lord de Dunstanville to reduce the dues. Eighteen months later the 40 inch cylinder steam engine and other machinery was advertised for sale. In 1839 the mine was still working, producing 2½ tons of copper.

=== National Explosives Works ===
The Kennall Gunpowder Company was granted a draft licence and their plan approved, under The Explosives Act, 1875 for a factory at Loggans Towans in June 1883.

Upton Towans is the site of the National Explosives Works (known locally as the Dynamite Works or Dynamite Towans) which was established in 1888 to supply explosives to the local mines. The dunes were flattened and small enclosures made to house individual buildings for the manufacture of the explosives. The enclosures were built to avoid chain reactions when an explosion occurred and although overgrown with vegetation, are still clearly seen today, as is the network of single-track railways. An accidental explosion on 4 September, 1894, killed two men, Samuel Pick Craze and James Perry. On one occasion an explosion occurred in a nitroglycerine plant which broke windows in St Ives and, it was said, was heard on Dartmoor. During the First World War 1800 people were employed and the works supplied cordite to the Royal Navy. The company went into voluntary liquidation in 1919, closed in 1920, but the storage of explosives continued until the 1960s. The site is now part of the Upton Towans Nature Reserve.

=== Electricity transmission lines ===
In 1910, a coal-fired power station was built on the northern flank of Hayle Towans beside the mouth of the River Hayle. The station was in use from 1910 until it closed in 1973. The buildings were demolished soon after closure but the station's legacy can still be seen in the overhead transmission lines which cross the dunes, particularly at the southern section of The Towans (see photo).

== Folklore ==
It is said that in a gale the turrets of a castle belonging to Theodoric can be seen. Once king of Cornwall he is notorious for beheading an Irish saint who came to Cornwall in the 5th-century.

== Bibliography ==
- Hamilton Jenkin, A. K. (1980). Mines and Miners of Cornwall; 5: Hayle, Gwinear & Gwithian. Bracknell: Forge Books. ISBN 0 904662 10 1.
