= Gwinear, Cornwall =

Coordinates: 50.18796°N 5.37115°W

Gwinear: Cornish: Gwynnyer
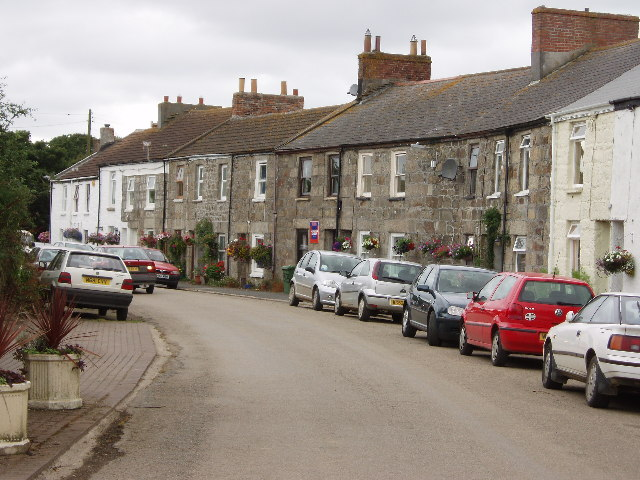

- Location within Cornwall
- Civil parish: Gwinear-Gwithian
- Unitary authority: Cornwall
- Ceremonial county: Cornwall
- Region: South West
- Country: England
- Sovereign state: United Kingdom
- Post town: HAYLE
- Postcode district: TR27
- Dialling code: 01736
- Police: Devon and Cornwall
- Fire: Cornwall
- Ambulance: South Western
- UK Parliament: Camborne and Redruth
- Website: Gwinear-Gwithian

Gwinear (Cornish: Gwynnyer) is a small village and former civil parish, now in the parish of Gwinear-Gwithian, in the Cornwall district, in west Cornwall, England, UK. It is about two miles (3 km) east of Hayle and overlooks the Angarrack valley. In 1931 the parish had a population of 1234. On 1 April 1934 the parish was abolished to form "Gwinear Gwithian".

Gwinear village sits on a hill with expansive views from the northern end of the village down the Angarrack valley. There is a local pub, the Royal Standard, and a community hall. Gwinear is the church town of Gwinear-Gwithian civil parish.

== Church history ==
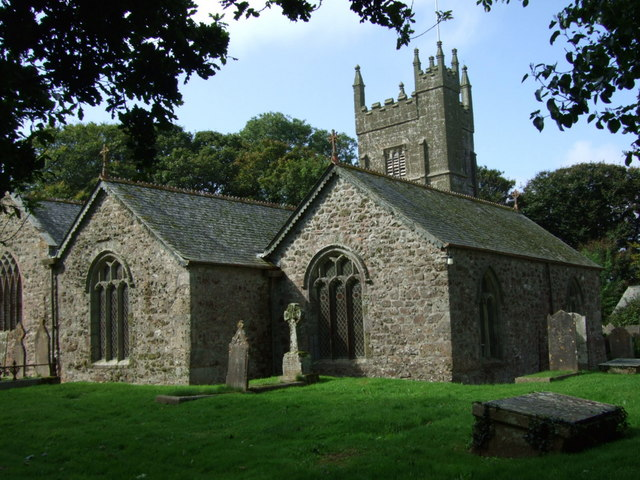
Gwinear Church

Gwinear church is dedicated to St Winierus (in Irish Fingar), according to legend the leader of the Irish missionaries who came to this district in the 6th century. At Roseworthy there was once a holy well and chapel of the saint, which was also the site of the most splendid Celtic cross of Cornwall (now at Lanherne). The advowson of Gwinear belonged to the manor of Drannack and was sold in 1311 by the Bevilles to Sir Richard de Stapeldon in trust for his brother's foundation at Oxford, later Exeter College.

The parish church of St Gwinear is of the 13th and 14th centuries (tower mid-15th century, built of granite in three stages). There are three aisles: the south aisle which is shorter than the nave, an inner north aisle, and further north the Arundell Aisle. Feast day is held on the first Sunday after 9 May. In 1880 the living was worth approximately £250 per annum and came with a large modern vicarage and a "good glebe". The chapelry at Wall was built in 1828.

There are three Cornish crosses in the parish; one on Connor Down and two in the churchyard. One of those in the churchyard was brought there from a road junction about half a mile east of the churchtown.

Malachy Hitchins, astronomer, became Vicar of St Hilary in 1775; in 1785 he also became Vicar of Gwinear and retained both these livings till his death, which took place on 28 March 1809 at St Hilary.

== Mining ==
A large tract of land to the south of the church and vicarage, was part of the Herland mine (also known as the Manor Mine) which had rich deposits of copper, a little tin, and silver ore. In 1756 the mine was worked by a 70-inch atmospheric engine and shafts went down to 100 fathoms (600 ft; 180 m). A Boulton and Watt engine was installed in 1798 and the shaft was 155 fathoms (930 ft; 283 m) deep. At 110 fathoms (660 ft; 200 m) a rich deposit of silver ore was found and 108 tons extracted. A third engine was installed in 1815; this time designed by Richard Trevithick. Described as a ″33-inch high-pressure, pole-puffer″ it was said to do the work of three of Watt's largest engines.

In the 1840s Gwinear had a number of mines based on two parallel ridges running through the parish in an east–west direction. At that time Gwinear had four public houses, a thriving weekly market and feast was a three-day affair with wrestlers from Lancashire competing with the local men. In the 1860s the mines were employing hundreds of men, women and children but by the 1880s the mines were closed and the machinery removed. Many families had migrated to other mining districts. The population in 1861 was 2,878, reduced to 2,026 in 1871 and to 1,567 in 1881. (In 1801 the population was 1,650).

A communion plate in use in the parish church in the 1880s was a product of the Herland mine.

== Notable buildings ==
Lanyon Farm and Polkinghorne Farm (both less than a mile from Gwinear Road station) are both 17th century. The grade II listed Taskus farmhouse (grid reference SW58943556) was part of an 119 acres (48 ha) freehold estate which, formerly owned by William Pendarves and the Penneck family, was put up for sale on 25 November 1880. The land was described as of excellent quality with arable, meadow, pasture, orchard and other land, and lying within a ring fence. At the time of sale the most recent proprietor was Robert Osborne. A redeemed land tax of £5 5s 0d was payable.

== Cornish wrestling ==
Cornish wrestling tournaments, for prizes, have been held in Gwinear in the 1800s. and the 1900s. Venues included the Lanyon Arms where Gold laced hats were the main prize.

See also Cornish wrestling at Carnhell Green.
