= St Elwyn's Church, Hayle =

Church in Cornwall, England

St Elwyn’s Church, Hayle
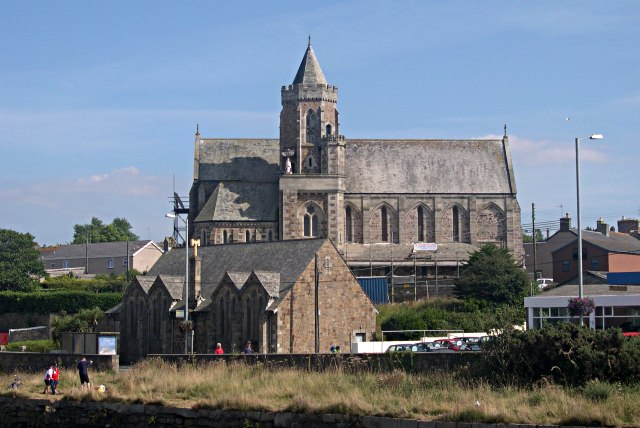
- St Elwyn’s Church, Hayle
- St Elwyn’s Church, Hayle
- 50°11′15.26″N 5°25′12.94″W
- Location: Hayle
- Country: England
- Denomination: Church of England
- Churchmanship: Anglo-Catholic

History
- Dedication: St Elywn
- Consecrated: 9 October 1888

Architecture
- Heritage designation: Grade II* listed
- Architect: John Dando Sedding
- Groundbreaking: 5 August 1886
- Completed: 9 October 1888

Specifications
- Length: 101 feet (31 m)
- Width: 64 feet (20 m)
- Height: 88.5 feet (27.0 m)

Administration
- Province: Province of Canterbury
- Diocese: Diocese of Truro
- Archdeaconry: Cornwall
- Deanery: Penwith
- Parish: Hayle

Listed Building – Grade II*
- Official name: Church of St Elwyn
- Designated: 14 January 1988
- Reference no.: 1143688

St Elwyn’s Church is a Grade II* listed parish church in the Church of England Diocese of Truro in Hayle, Cornwall, England, UK.

== History ==
The foundation stone was laid by Miss Susan Hockin, sister of the rector of Phillack, on 5 August 1886. It was built to designs of the architect John Dando Sedding. The general style is Early English Gothic, but the large west window is of the Decorated Gothic style, as is the upper portion of the tower. The bold projecting balcony of the musicians’ gallery forms a striking feature. The altar, choir-stalls and nave seats were carved by Mr. Stanlake of Plymouth. The pulpit was made by James Richard of Hayle. The tower took its inspiration from Lostwithiel church. The slate roof terminated with a wrought iron finial carrying a vane. The finial was from Holman and Sons foundry at St Just. The blacksmith’s work was done by Mr. Richards of Hayle. The stone for the church came from the Tregenhorne quarry. The dressed stone was Breage granite. Corsham stone was used for the arcades and the choir screen, which includes courses of Polyphant stone. The font is entirely of Polyphant stone. It was consecrated on 9 October 1888.

== Parish status ==
The church is in a joint parish served by the Godrevy team ministry with:

- St Erth's Church, St Erth
- St Gwinear’s Church, Gwinear
- St Felicitas and St Piala's Church, Phillack
- St Gothian's Church, Gwithian

== Organ ==
The church contains an organ by William Sweetland of Bath dating from 1875. This was purchased for £200 by subscription in advance of the opening of the church. A specification of the organ can be found on the National Pipe Organ Register.
