= Penwith Hundred =

Ancient administrative unit of Cornwall, England

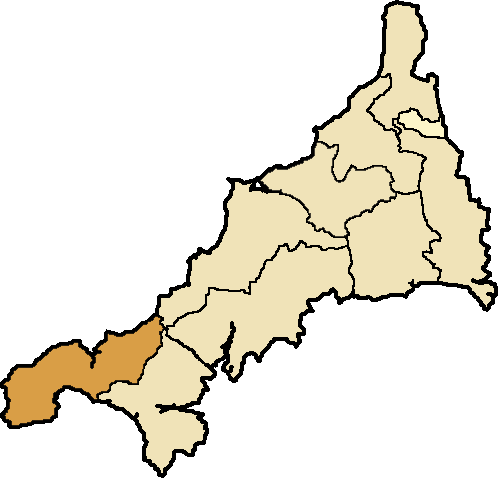
Penwith hundred, within Cornwall

Penwith Hundred was one of ten ancient administrative hundreds of the county of Cornwall, England, UK. The ancient hundred of Penwith was larger than the local government district of Penwith (1974–2009), which took its name. Daphne du Maurier in Vanishing Cornwall suggests that the name, Penwith, has three renderings; "the last promontory," "promontory on the left, and "the headland of slaughter," thus suggesting that this area might have been the site of prehistoric invasions of sea-borne fighters, or perhaps tribal battles. The eastern part became part of the Kerrier District.

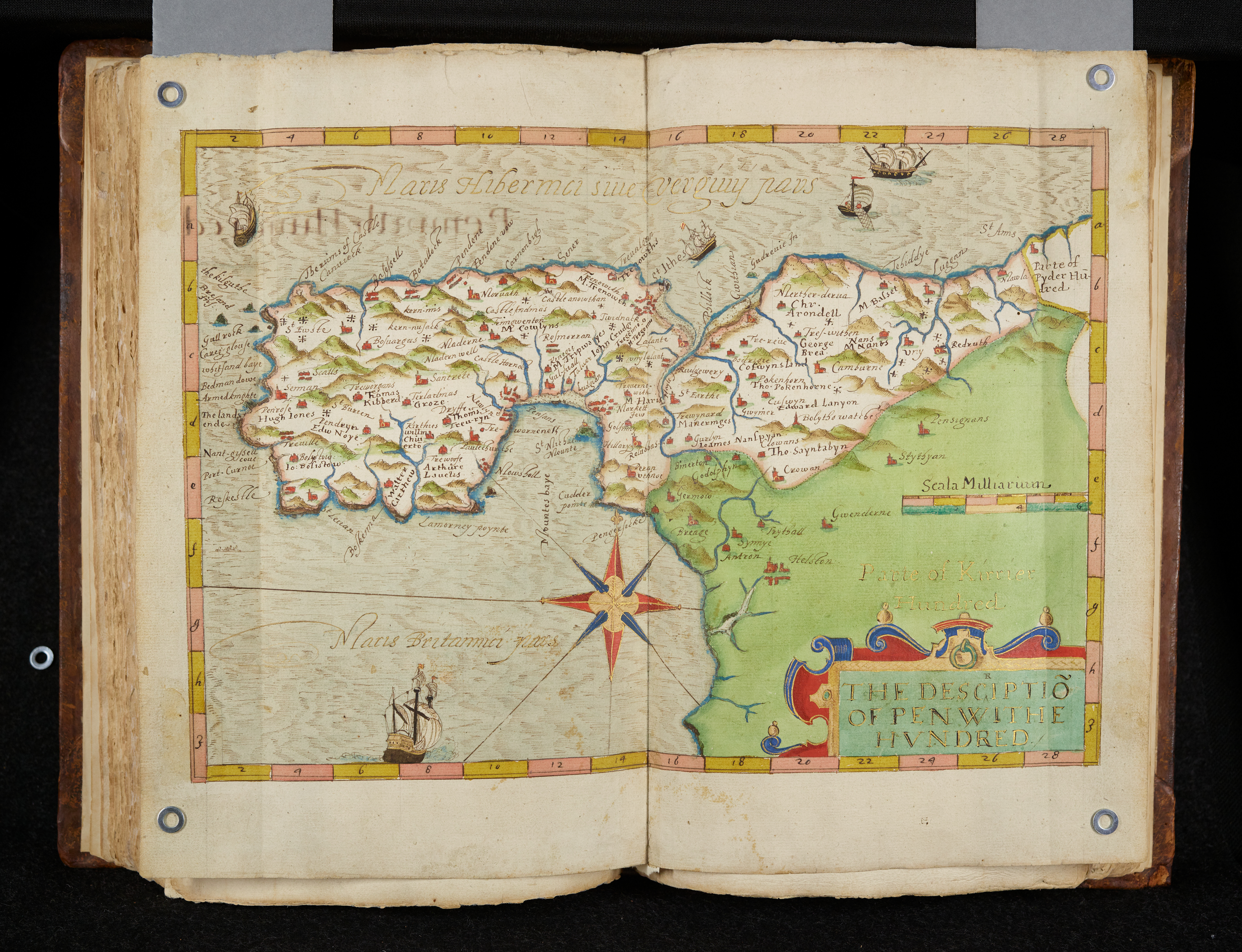
Norden's Map of Penwith Hundred.

All of the Hundreds of Cornwall belonged, and still belong, to the Duchy of Cornwall apart from Penwith which belonged to the Arundells of Lanherne. The Arundells sold it to the Hawkins family in 1813 and the Hawkins' went on to sell it to the Paynters in 1832. The Lordship of Penwith came with a great number of rights over the entire hundred. These included: rights to try certain cases of trespass, trespass on the law, debt and detinue, to appoint a jailor for the detention of persons apprehended, to receive high-rent from the lords of the principal manors and to claim the regalia of the navigable rivers and havens, the profits of the royal gold and silver mines, and all wrecks, escheats, deodands, treasure trove, waifs, estrays, goods of felons and droits of admiralty happening within the hundred.

The main settlement was Penzance, 50.117°N 5.538°W. Other settlements within the area included St Ives, Hayle, St Just in Penwith, Camborne and Marazion. The institutions of the Penwith hundred were centred initially in the parish of Gwithian and were moved to Penzance in 1771 (or earlier) following large successive inundations of blown sand. There are records of several institutions attached to the Penwith Hundred, including a Hundred Gaol (maintained for civil debtors), a Hundred Pound for stray animals and a Hundred Court.

The parishes of the Penwith hundred were Camborne, Crowan, St Buryan, Gulval (or Lanisly), Gwinear, Gwithian, Illogan, Lelant (or Uny Lelant), Ludgvan, Madron, Morvah, Paul, Perranuthnoe, Phillack, Redruth, St Erth, St Hilary, St Ives, St Just-in-Penwith, St Levan, Sancreed, Sennen, Towednack, Zennor.
