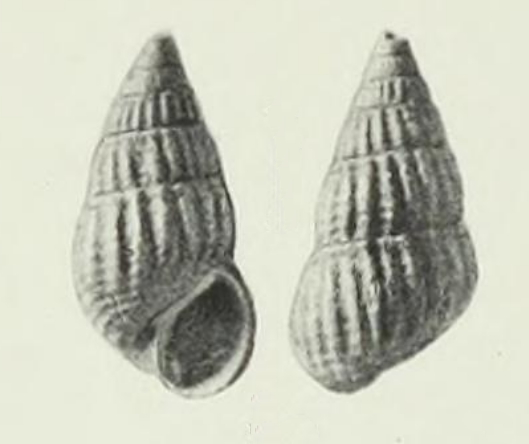
- Shell of Alvania enysii

Scientific classification
- Kingdom: Animalia
- Phylum: Mollusca
- Class: Gastropoda
- Subclass: Caenogastropoda
- Order: Littorinimorpha
- Superfamily: Rissooidea
- Family: Rissoidae
- Genus: Alvania
- Species: †A. enysii

Binomial name
- †Alvania enysii (Bell, 1898)

Synonyms
- † Rissoa enysii Bell, 1898 (Alvania accepted as full genus)

= Alvania enysii =

Species of gastropod

Alvania enysii is an extinct species of minute sea snail, a marine gastropod mollusk or micromollusk in the family Rissoidae.

== Description ==
The length of the shell attains 6 mm, its diameter 3 mm.

(Original description) The small shell is elongate-conical. It contains 7-8 nearly flat whorls, slightly angulate or constricted immediately below the suture. The spire is regularly tapering to a blunt point. The suture is well marked. The whorls are ornamented by numerous straight ribs which die out on the body whorl. They are hardly extending to the base. The sculpture also shows distinct spiral ridges which are continuous beyond the termination of the ribs. Crossing the latter, they produce a slight tuberculation where they intersect, and are prominent at the base of the shell. The ovate aperture is angulate, and has a small chink above. The outer lip is roundly lunate. The peristome is continuous. The inner lip is slightly deflected in front of a minute perforation.

== Distribution ==
Fossils were found in Pliocene strata off St Erth, Great Britain.
