= Red River (Koner) =

River in north-west Cornwall, England

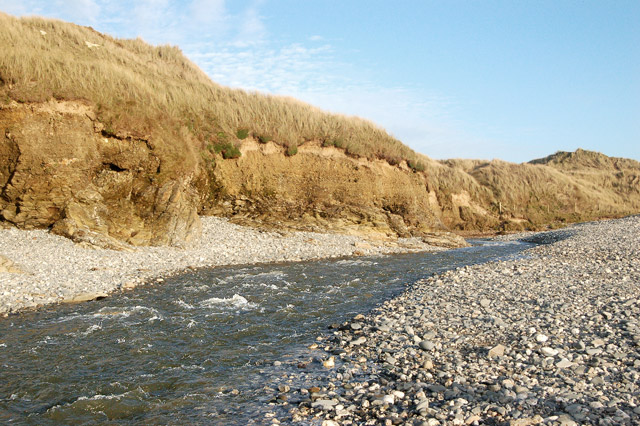

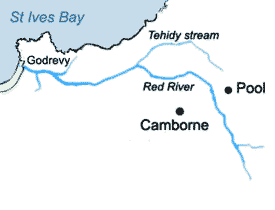
- Map of the course of the Red River and the Tehidy Stream
- Native name: Dowr Koner (Cornish)

Location
- Country: United Kingdom
- Region: Cornwall

Physical characteristics
- Source
  - location: Bolenowe
  - coordinates: 50°11′32″N 5°15′20″W
- Mouth
  - location: Godrevy, St Ives Bay
  - coordinates: 50°13′42″N 5°22′59″W
- Length: 13 km (8.1 mi)

Basin features
- Tributaries
  - right: Tehidy Stream

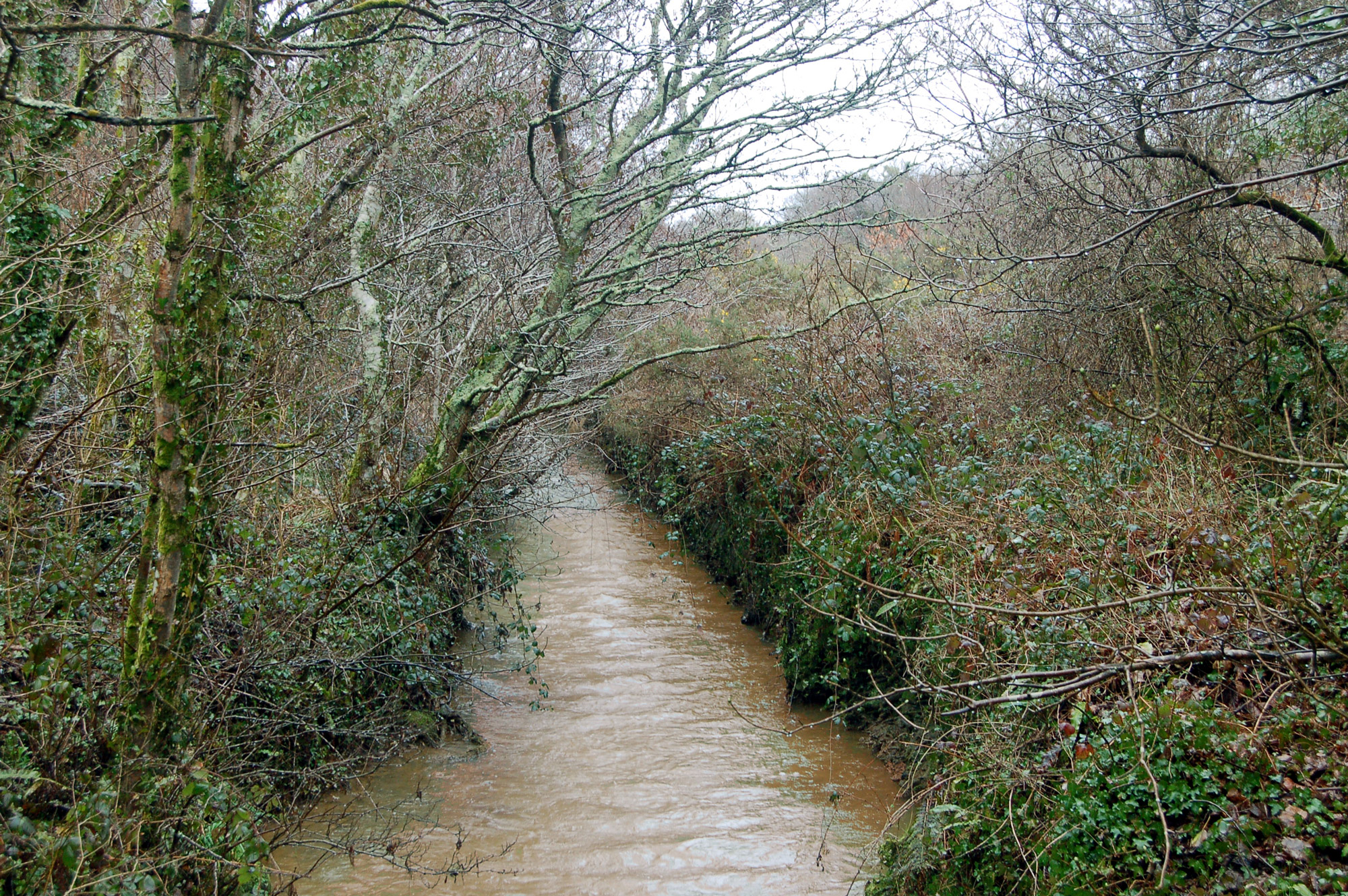
The Red River near Menadarva Mill

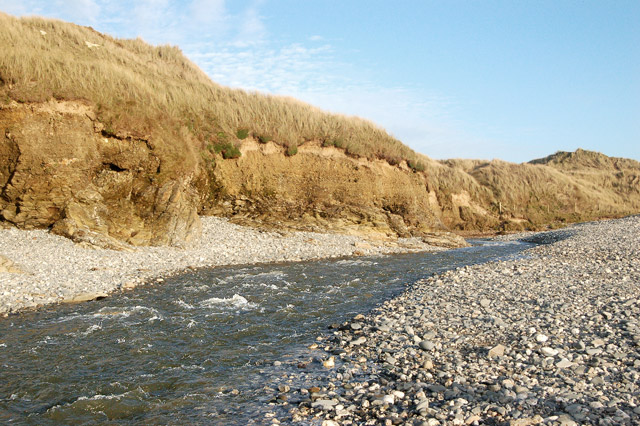
The Red River at Godrevy beach

The Red River (Cornish: Dowr Koner) is a small river in south-west Cornwall, England, United Kingdom which issues into St Ives Bay at Godrevy on Cornwall's Atlantic coast. The Red River was given its name from the mineral deposits associated with tin mining, particularly oxides of Iron, which formerly coloured its water red. The river's gradient is relatively steep; over its 8 miles (13 km) length, it falls 170 metres (560 ft) from source to sea.

== Geography ==
The Red River rises from springs near Bolenowe on the Carnmenellis granite batholith, an upland plateau. The river flows north, passing through a gorge in the granite ridge west of Carn Brea. Beyond the gorge, the river passes Tuckingmill, and Tuckingmill Valley Park, once a centre of mining and associated industries. At the hamlet of Combe, the Tehidy stream joins the Red River which then turns west towards Godrevy.

== Tin streaming ==
The Red River's catchment area includes the major mining areas of Tuckingmill, Pool, and Camborne. Thus:

The Red River catchment has been subjected to mining and mineral working for many centuries, particularly during the eighteenth and nineteenth centuries. It has been extensively tin streamed and its water used for mineral processing, both for use in the mineral separation processes and as a source of power. As a result of past mining activities the river has undergone many modifications and for significant parts of its course the river has been diverted, canalised, and, in places, embanked. Very little, if any, of the river can be considered to be in a truly natural condition.

In The Mining Journal (1872), the author, Mr Watson, asked ″if any stream or gully in Australia, Brazil or California had proved to be so continuously rich and productive as the Red River.″ The river was fed by tributary streams that flowed from the dressing-floors and slime pits of the principal mines, and the ″squatters″ could earn £20,000 per year working on the slimy river-bed. Mr Watson remarked on the inefficiency of the mines in allowing so much tin to be lost. By 1879, Captain James of South Frances mine, estimated £30,000s worth of tin was lost by the mines. On 25 June 1879 the lease for the tenement of Rosewarne Mill was auctioned at Abraham's Hotel, Camborne. The sale included the "valuable" tin stream works" including a 12-inch cylinder engine, three waterwheels, stamps and all the minerals found in the mill leat and the main river within certain defined boundaries. The Magor Coombe streamworks were bought for £750 by Captain Rabling in 1879. In January 1883 The Cornishman newspaper reported that an estimated £42,000 worth of tin went down the river and many thousands of pounds yearly are made by ″the squatters″ who set up machinery and harvest the waste products of the mines. Two years later, in July 1885 the newspaper reported there were twenty-nine ″works″ employing 861 people in reworking the tinsand and slime which escaped from the mines upstream.

Within Tuckingmill Valley Park is a small island containing the remains of a chimney stack, brick scrubber building and collapsed flue. The buildings (circa 1905) are associated with the production of arsenic which was a valuable resource for Cornish tin and copper mines when production of the metals was declining and the mines were closing. More efficient calcining furnaces were built and the gases fed through convoluted labyrinths where they cooled and condensed on the flue walls. The walls were scraped and the deposits further refined to make 100% pure arsenic. Arsenic was used as a pesticide for the boll weevil (Anthonomus grandis) in the cotton fields of the United States, as well as in the paint and dye industry producing new colours such as canary yellow and emerald green.

High stone-faced banks, are the remains of ten sluices which controlled the flow of water, to enable the recovery of tailings. The sluices were part of the Tolgarrick tin treatment operations which closed in 1986.

Following the closure of the last mine, South Crofty, in 1998, the Red River has lost its distinctive colour, and natural ecology and biodiversity are being re-established. In the 2017, the Environment Agency granted permission for the new mine owner to discharge effluent from the mine to prepare for future reopening.

The river gives its name to the Red River Inn public house (formerly The Pendarves Arms) in nearby Gwithian.

== Wildlife and ecology ==
The Red River is one of the most modified streams in the UK due to centuries of mining which has led to heavy metal contamination and the realignment of the course. The river is gradually re-establishing a more natural look as banks erode and some of the sediment deposited to form bars and small islands.

The river and ponds of the Tuckingmill Valley Park provide valuable habitat within an urban area, for two nationally scarce insects; scarce blue-tailed damselfly (Ischnura pumilio) and small red damselfly (Ceriagrion tenellum). The larvae of the golden-ringed dragonfly (Ceriagrion tenellum) have been found and the adults can be seen through the summer and autumn. Other dragonflies include the common darter (Sympetrum striolatum) and the once rare migrant hawker (Aeshna mixta) which usually fly in August and September. In all, 17 species of dragonfly have been recorded on the river in the 21st century.

Both frog (Rana temporaria temporaria) and common toad (Bufo bufo) spawn are found along the edges of the ponds in the early part of the year and the otter (Lutra lutra) has returned following the improvement in water quality. The invasive plants, parrot feather (Myriophyllum aquaticum) is regularly removed by hand to prevent its spread, and the growth of Japanese knotweed (Reynoutria japonica) has been restricted by chemical treatment.

Both the Tehidy Brook and the Red River are home to Brown Trout, DNA analysis of these fish shows that they are distinct from those in other Cornish rivers and are more pollution tolerant.

== See also ==
- Geology of Cornwall
- The Red River by Paul Williams available from Amazon Books 2016
