= St Gwinear's Church, Gwinear =

St Gwinear’s Church, Gwinear
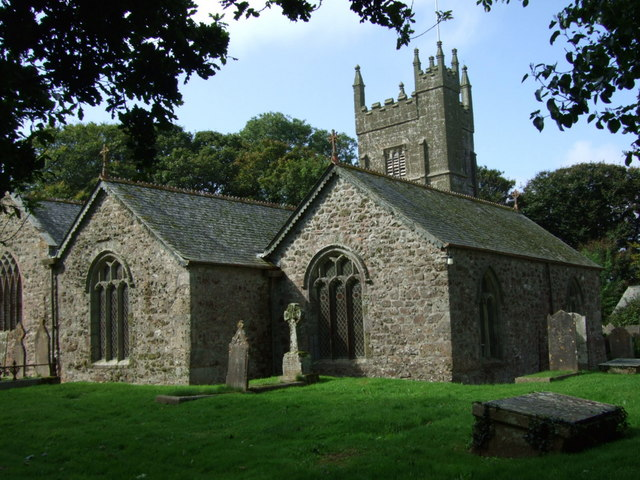
- St Gwinear’s Church, Gwinear
- St Gwinear’s Church, Gwinear
- 50°11′15.05″N 5°22′11.83″W
- Location: Gwinear, Cornwall
- Country: England
- Denomination: Church of England

History
- Dedication: Saint Gwinear

Administration
- Province: Province of Canterbury
- Diocese: Diocese of Truro
- Archdeaconry: Cornwall
- Deanery: Penwith
- Parish: Gwinear
- Location within Cornwall

Listed Building – Grade I
- Official name: Church of St Winnear
- Designated: 14 January 1988
- Reference no.: 1159537

St Gwinear's Church, Gwinear is a Grade I listed church in the Church of England in Gwinear, Cornwall.

== History ==
Gwinear church is dedicated to St Winierus (in Irish Fingar), according to legend the leader of the Irish missionaries who came to this district in the 6th-century. At Roseworthy there was once a holy well and chapel of the saint, which was also the site of the most splendid Celtic cross of Cornwall (now at Lanherne). The advowson of Gwinear belonged to the manor of Drannack and was sold in 1311 by the Bevilles to Sir Richard de Stapeldon (d.1326) in trust for his brother's foundation at Oxford, later Exeter College.

The parish church of St Gwinear is of the 13th and 14th centuries (tower mid 15th century, built of granite in three stages). There are three aisles: the south aisle which is shorter than the nave, an inner north aisle, and further north the Arundell Aisle.

Malachy Hitchins, astronomer, became Vicar of St Hilary in 1775; in 1785, he also became Vicar of Gwinear and retained both these livings till his death, which took place on 28 March 1809 at St Hilary.

The chancel was restored by John Dando Sedding in 1870. The roof was repaired in oak and raised to its old pitch. New stone coping and a cross were added to the gable. The five-light window was rebuilt copying from the original. New oak chancel seating was provided.

The church was restored between 1878 and 1879. The aisle and roofs were restored with the four roofs costing £689. A new three-light window was placed at the west end of the south aisle. The chancel screen was repaired and re-erected in its original position, enclosing the western bay of the chancel. New seating of pitch pine was provided. The floors were laid with concrete and the aisles laid with slates of Delabole stone. The church was lit with Hesperus lamps provided by Jones and Wallis of Birmingham. The Rural Dean, Revd F Hockin of Phillack provided a low screen to separate the Arundel chapel. It was reopened on 25 November 1879 and the new bells were rung for the first time on 23 January 1880.

== Parish status ==
The church is in a joint parish with,

- St Elwyn's Church, Hayle
- St Erth's Church, St Erth
- St Felicitas and St Piala's Church, Phillack
- St Gothian's Church, Gwithian

== Organ ==
The church contained an organ by Hele & Co. The opening recital was given by Hubert Stanley Middleton, organist of Truro Cathedral, on 14 January 1925. This was replaced by an organ from Tregajorran Wesleyan Chapel dating from 1922 by Griffen and Stroud. It was installed in St Gwinear's Church in 1993 by Lance Foy. A specification of the organ can be found on the National Pipe Organ Register.
