= St Erth's Church, St Erth =

St Erth’s Church, St Erth
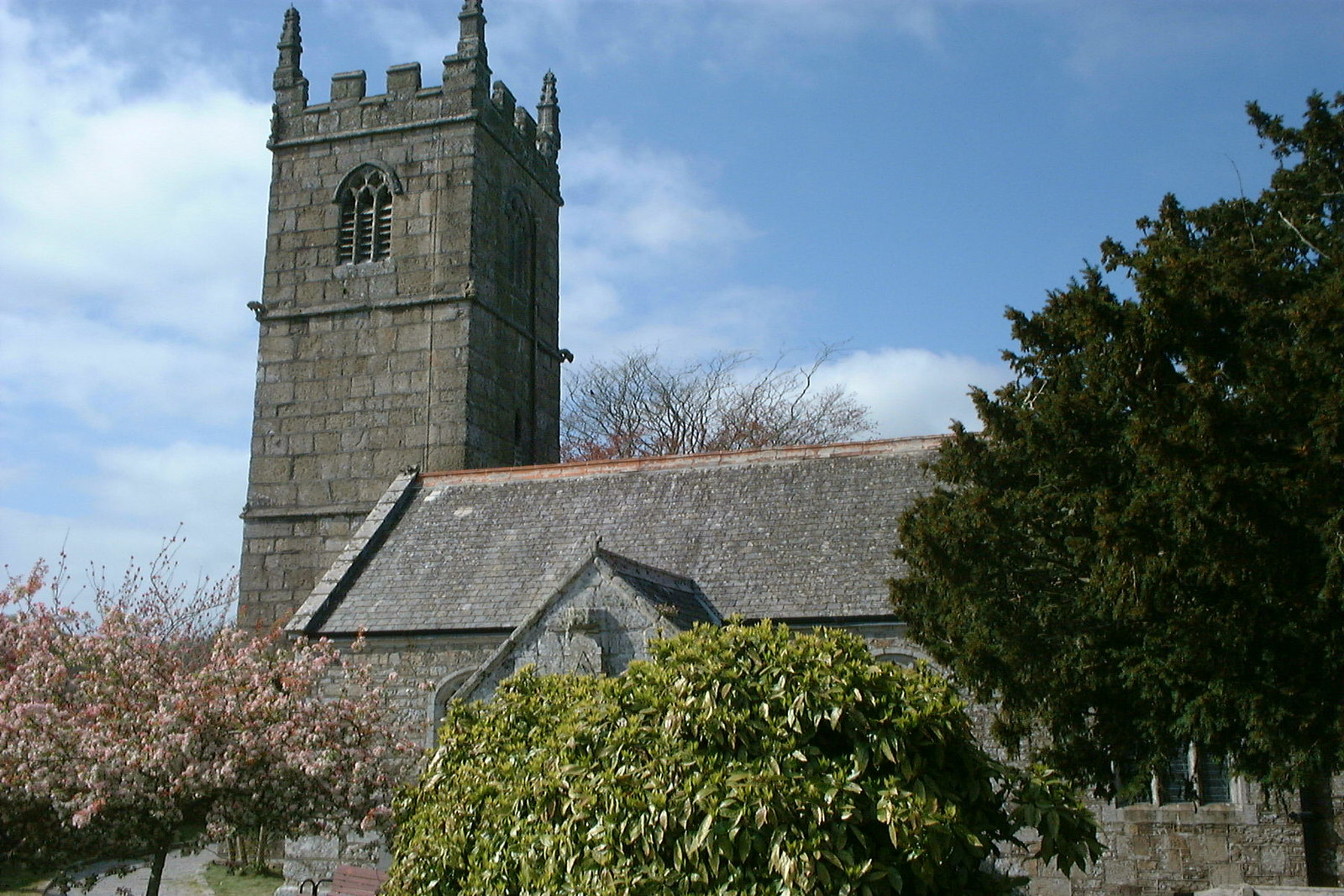
- St Erth’s Church, St Erth
- St Erth’s Church, St Erth
- 50°09′52.35″N 5°25′56.93″W
- Location: St Erth
- Country: England
- Denomination: Church of England

History
- Dedication: Erc of Slane

Administration
- Province: Province of Canterbury
- Diocese: Diocese of Truro
- Archdeaconry: Cornwall
- Deanery: Penwith
- Parish: St Erth
- Location within Cornwall

Listed Building – Grade I
- Official name: Church of Saint Erth
- Designated: 14 January 1988
- Reference no.: 1327632

St Erth’s Church, St Erth, is a Grade I listed parish church in the Church of England Diocese of Truro in St Erth, Cornwall, England, UK.

== History ==
The parish church is dedicated to St Erc (Latin Ercus) and is probably of the 14th century. It is not a large church and has a west tower of three stages. There are north and south aisles, the arcade in the north aisle having piers of two different types.

It was restored in 1747 by Vicar Collins. There was a subsequent restoration in 1872 to 1874 which resulted in an almost complete rebuilding, except for the tower. The walls were built with Polyphant stone, the old pews were replaced by open benches of pitch pine. The chancel roof was decorated and the chancel was paved with encaustic tiles. The east window was replaced. Two dormer windows were inserted in the roof. The wagon roof of the south porch is old and the font is Norman and of an unusual square design. The ornate wooden roofs of the nave and aisles and fine oak screen decorated with the Four Evangelists are due to the restoration of 1874. The wife of the vicar, Mrs Mills, presented a new font of carved Caen stone. The church was reopened by the Bishop on 20 February 1874.

In 1882 a new east stained-glass window was installed in the chancel. Inscriptions are ″to the glory of God″ and ″in loving memory of Lawrence Henry Orde Woodd″. Mr Woodd was an Inspector of Schools and died in the churchyard while entering the church to attend divine service. A memorial window to the Reverend A. W. Mills was unveiled in November 1886; the lower part of the window contains scenes from the life of the Good Shepherd, with a Latin inscription below.

The Trewinnard chapel was restored in 1912 under the supervision of Sedding and Wheatley in memory of the Hawkins family. The cost was borne by Mrs Hawkins, widow of Christopher Hawkins of the Trewinnard Estate. The carving around the altar was done by Hitch and Co of London, and Rashleigh, Pinwell and Co of Plymouth. One of the panels of the seat ends bears a figure of the late Bishop of Truro Dr. Charles Stubbs, who is depicted blessing the people.

== Organ ==
The organ was installed in 1881 by William Sweetland of Bath for £300. The inauguration was on Thursday, 1 September 1881. A specification of the organ can be found on the National Pipe Organ Register.

== Notable burials ==
Annie Walke who was a painter and poet is buried in St Erth's churchyard, location unknown.

== Parish status ==
The church is in a joint parish served by the Godrevy team ministry with:

- St Gwinear’s Church, Gwinear
- St Gothian's Church, Gwithian
- St Elwyn's Church, Hayle
- St Felicitas and St Piala's Church, Phillack
