= Felec =

Saint Felec of Cornwall
- Died: 5th or 6th centuries
- Feast: 20 November
- Patronage: Phillack church, west Cornwall

Felec or Felix was an obscure 5th- or 6th-century British saint active in Cornwall. The church of St Felicitas and St Piala's Church, Phillack near Hayle is dedicated to Saint Felec (as he appears in a 10th-century Vatican codex). Later generations mistook him for the female Saint Felicity (alias Felicitas) of Rome.

Saint Felix was said to have had the miraculous gift of being able to communicate with lions, cats, and other feline creatures. There is also a Mount St Phillack in Victoria, Australia not far from Mount St Gwinear.

Felec could be equated with Felix, a supposed early king of either Cornwall or Lyonesse and the father of Mark of Cornwall, according to the Prose Tristan (c. 1235) and later Italian Arthurian romances, but this reference is very late. The character is probably mythical, having been confused with the 7th-century saint Felix of Burgundy. Like Lyonesse, Dunwich, the centre of his diocese, was inundated by the flood that led to the destruction of Lyonesse.

Piala is said to have been the sister of Saint Gwinear.

== See also ==
- List of Cornish saints
- Christianity in Cornwall
