= Mining Journal =

Mining Journal may mean:

- The Mining Journal, the predominant daily newspaper of Marquette, Michigan, in the Upper Peninsula of Michigan.
- The Mining Journal (trade magazine), founded in 1835
