= Ploulec'h =

Ploulec'h Ploulec'h
- Commune
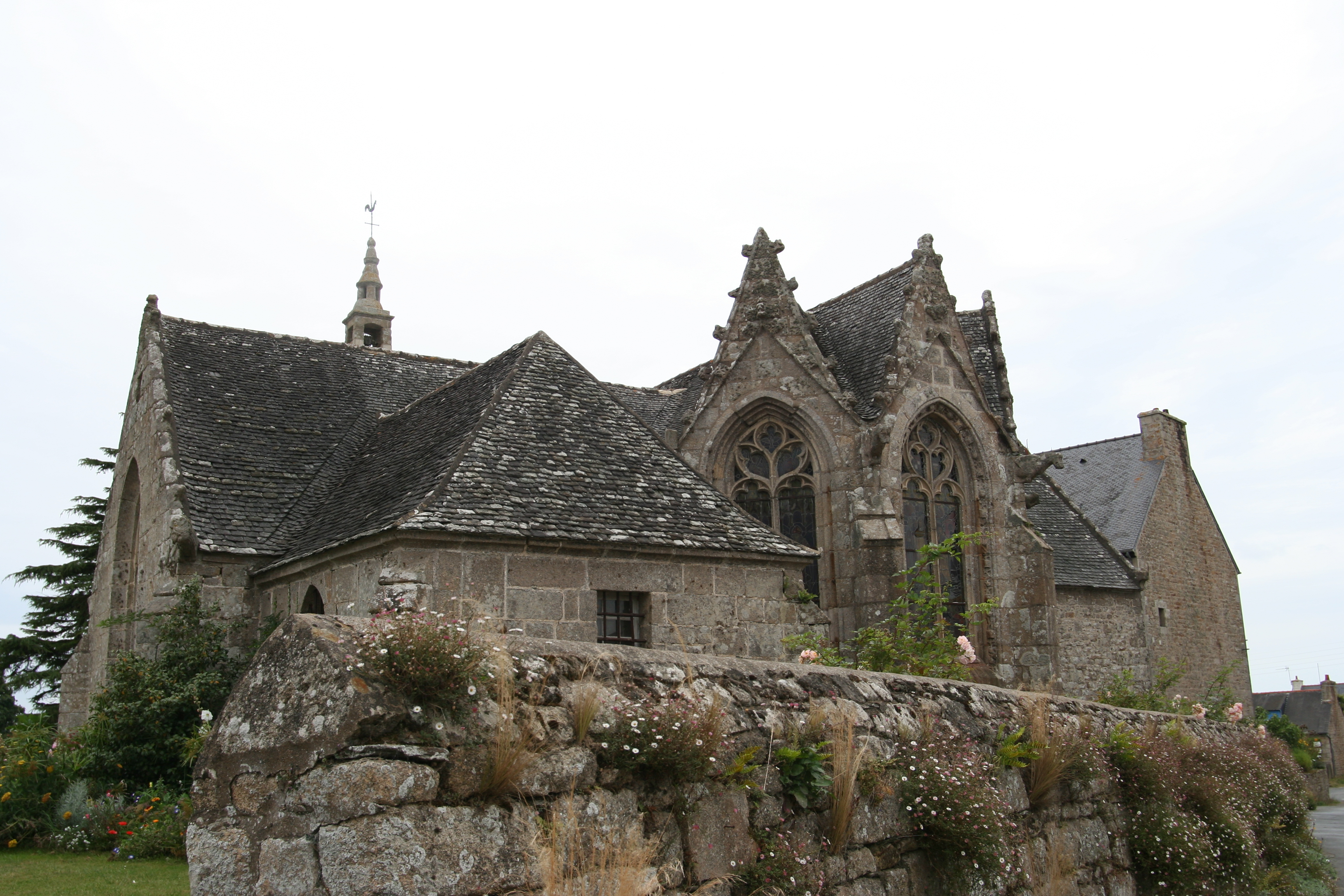
- The church of Ploulec'h
- Location of Ploulec'h
- Location within France Location within Brittany
- Coordinates: 48°43′08″N 3°30′11″W
- Country: France
- Region: Brittany
- Department: Côtes-d'Armor
- Arrondissement: Lannion
- Canton: Lannion
- Intercommunality: Lannion-Trégor Communauté

Government
  - Mayor (2020–2026): Sylvain Camus
- Area^{1}: 10.15 km^{2} (3.92 sq mi)
- Highest elevation: 102 m (335 ft)
- Lowest elevation: 0 m (0 ft)
- Population (2023): 1,598
  - Density: 157.4/km^{2} (407.8/sq mi)
- Time zone: UTC+01:00 (CET)
  - Summer (DST): UTC+02:00 (CEST)
- INSEE/Postal code: 22224 /22300
- ^{1} French Land Register data, which excludes lakes, ponds, glaciers > 1 km^{2} (0.386 sq mi or 247 acres) and river estuaries.

Ploulec'h (Breton: Ploulec'h) is a commune in the Côtes-d'Armor department of Brittany in northwestern France.

== Population ==
Inhabitants of Ploulec'h are called ploulec'hois or ploulec'hiens in French.

== Breton language ==
The municipality launched a linguistic plan through Ya d'ar brezhoneg on 19 October 2006.

== International relations ==
Ploulec'h is twinned with:

- (United Kingdom) St Erth, Cornwall, UK

== See also ==
- Communes of the Côtes-d'Armor department
