= Phillack =

Village in west Cornwall, England

Coordinates: 50.19533°N 5.41300°W

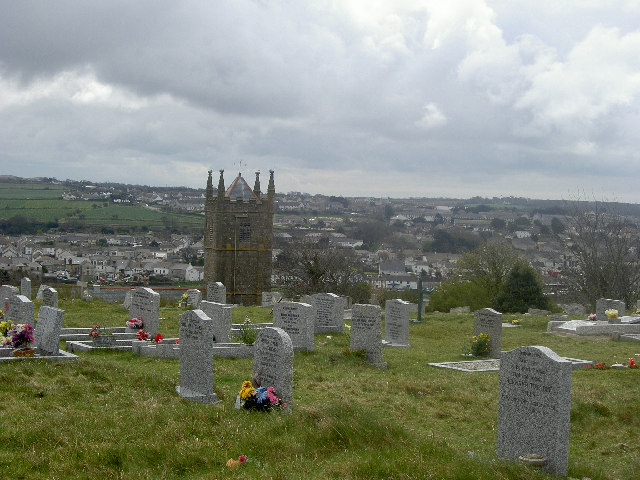
- Phillack church

- Location within Cornwall
- Civil parish: Hayle
- Unitary authority: Cornwall
- Ceremonial county: Cornwall
- Region: South West
- Country: England
- Sovereign state: United Kingdom

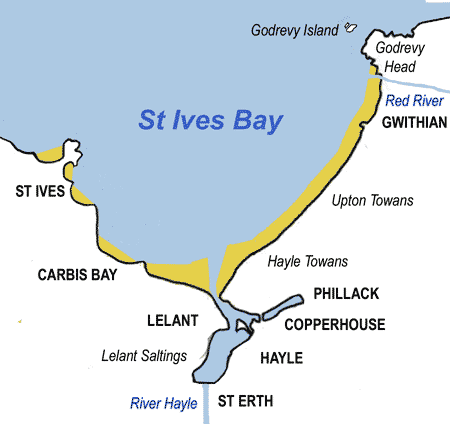
Sketch map showing Phillack's location

Phillack (Cornish: Eglosheyl) is a village in the parish of Hayle, in west Cornwall, England. It is about one mile (1.6 km) northeast of Hayle and half-a-mile (0.8 km) inland from St Ives Bay on Cornwall's Atlantic Ocean coast. The village is separated from the sea by a range of high sand dunes known as The Towans.

== History ==
There is some dispute over the origins of the name. In the 17th century, Phillack was believed to refer to the Irish Saint Felicitas who is said to have founded Phillack church in the 6th century. However, a 10th-century Vatican codex mentions a Saint Felec of Cornwall who is believed to have lived about the same time and may be dedicatee of the parish church.

=== Administrative history ===
Phillack was an ancient parish in the Penwith Hundred of Cornwall. As well as Phillack village, the parish included Copperhouse, Angarrack and the eastern parts of Hayle, as well as surrounding rural areas. In March 1866 a local government district was created for a newly-defined Hayle district, covering parts of both Phillack and St Erth parishes. The new district was administered by an elected local board. A separate Phillack local government district was created in September 1866 for the remainder of Phillack parish.

Such districts were reconstituted as urban districts under the Local Government Act 1894. The 1894 Act also directed that civil parishes could no longer straddle district boundaries, and so Phillack parish was split; the part in Hayle Urban District became a parish called "Phillack West", and the part in Phillack Urban District became a parish called "Phillack East". At the 1891 census (the last before the abolition of the parish), Phillack had a population of 4673. The part of St Erth parish in Hayle Urban District likewise became a separate parish, called St Erth Urban. As urban parishes these civil parishes did not qualify for parish councils; the two local authorities covering the area were Hayle Urban District Council and Phillack Urban District Council. Phillack Urban District Council established its offices at Copperhouse.

Hayle Urban District and Phillack Urban District were both abolished in 1934, being absorbed into West Penwith Rural District. Hayle Urban District Council assumed that a rural parish matching the abolished Hayle Urban District would be created, allowing for the creation of a Hayle Parish Council. However, the way the order abolishing the urban districts was drafted, it was not the two abolished urban districts but the three civil parishes of St Erth Urban, Phillack West and Phillack East which became rural parishes, with St Erth Urban being renamed Hayle despite only covering the western half of the town centre. On realising that this was the effect, the outgoing Hayle Urban District Council petitioned for the order to be amended, but was told it was too late.

It subsequently proved impossible to form the three new parish councils as not enough people were willing to stand. An inquiry was held in January 1935 into changing the parish boundaries, which was told that the fact the 1934 order perpetuated three parishes to cover the Hayle area was "regarded locally as absurd". The inquiry concluded that the three parishes of Hayle (formerly St Erth Urban), Phillack West and Phillack East should be merged into a single parish of Hayle, which took effect on 1 October 1935. The Phillack area has remained part of the parish of Hayle since 1935.

== Parish church ==
St Felicitas and St Piala's Church, Phillack was originally the parish church also of Hayle: it was built in the 15th century and rebuilt in 1856 by William White but the tower is original. It is part of the Godrevy Team Ministry The font is probably not medieval; half a coped stone is in the churchyard. There were over a 160 year period from 1763 to 1922 four rectors of Phillack belonging to the Hockin family: William (1763-1809), William (1809-1853), Frederick (1853-1902) and Arthur (1902-1922), probably unique among English parishes.

=== Antiquities ===
Two early stones have been found embedded in the original village church. One bears a 'Constantine' form of a Chi-Rho cross which may date to the 5th century; it was afterwards rebuilt into the wall directly above the apex of the arch of the doorway of the new church. The second is simple memorial stone bearing the name of "Clo[tualus] [son of] Mo[bra]ttus", dated between the fifth to eighth centuries, and now stands in the churchyard. Arthur G. Langdon (1896) recorded the existence of six stone crosses in the parish, including two in the churchyard. The others were at Copperhouse, at Bodriggy, in a field and in the rectory garden.

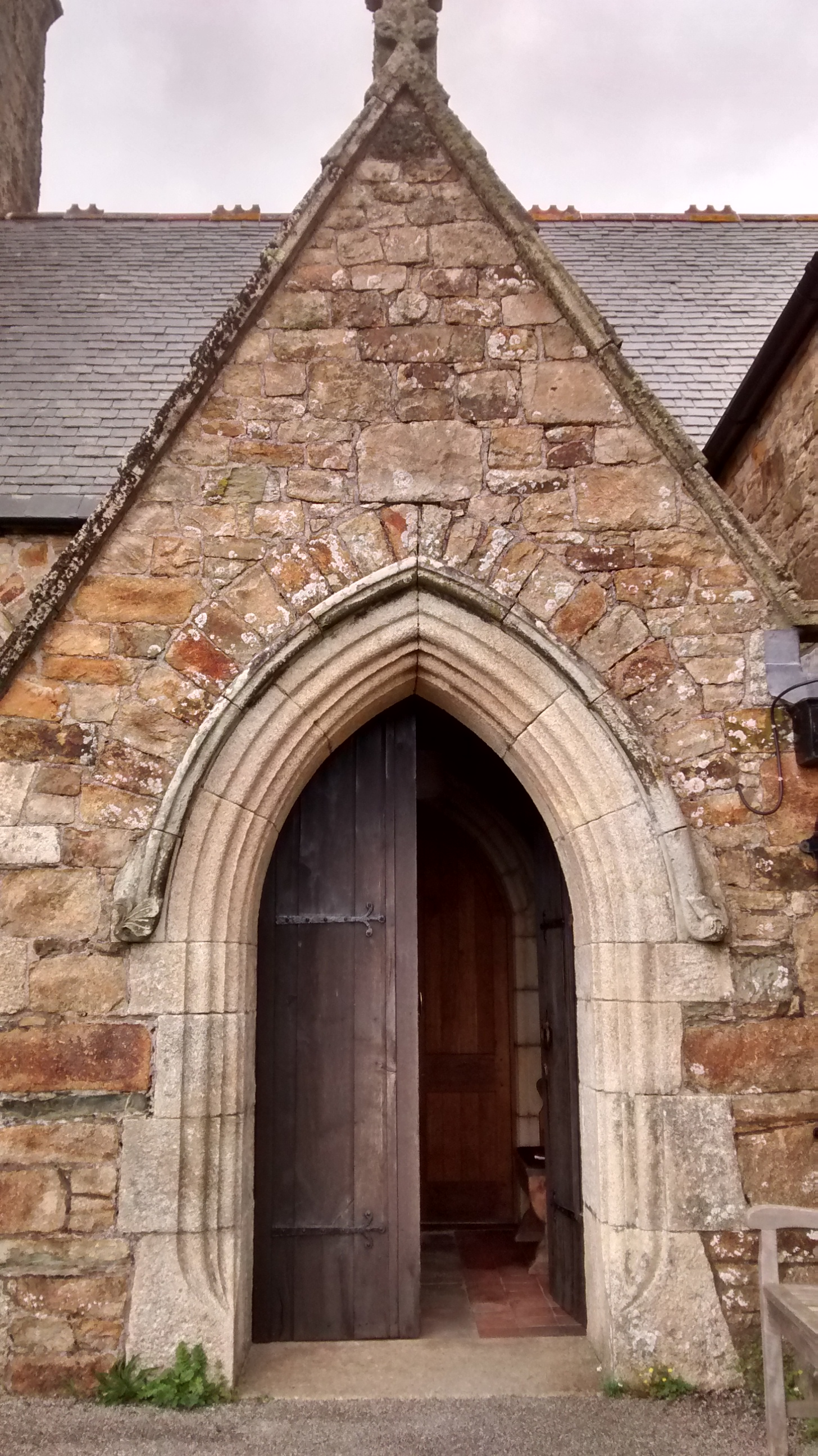
5th century Chi-Rho cross (above the door) on the porch
