= Gwithian =

Village in Cornwall, England

Coordinates: 50.2214°N 5.3865°W

Gwithian: Cornish: Godhyan
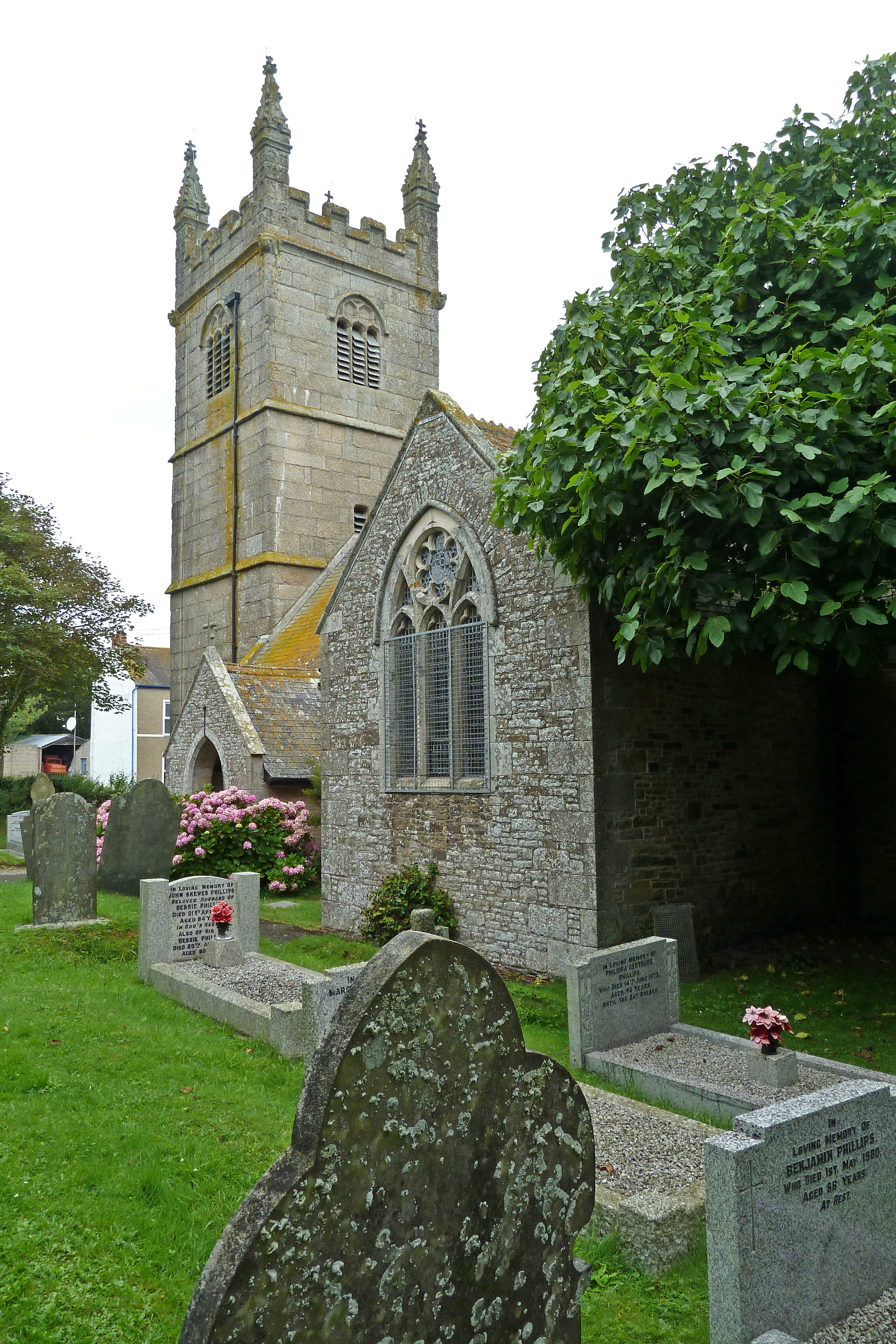
- St Gothian's Church, Gwithian

- Location within Cornwall
- Population: 3,032 (Civil Parish, 2001)
- OS grid reference: SW585412
- Civil parish: Gwinear-Gwithian
- Unitary authority: Cornwall
- Ceremonial county: Cornwall
- Region: South West
- Country: England
- Sovereign state: United Kingdom
- Post town: HAYLE
- Postcode district: TR27
- Dialling code: 01736
- Police: Devon and Cornwall
- Fire: Cornwall
- Ambulance: South Western
- UK Parliament: Camborne and Redruth

Gwithian (Cornish: Godhyan) is a coastal village and former civil parish, now in the parish of Gwinear-Gwithian, in the Cornwall district, in west Cornwall, England. It is three miles (5 km) north-east of Hayle and four miles (6.5 km) east of St Ives, Cornwall across St Ives Bay. In 1931 the parish had a population of 634. On 1 April 1934 the parish was abolished to form "Gwinear Gwithian".

Gwithian has a pub, the Red River Inn, which was formerly named the Pendarves Arms. The pub takes its name from the nearby Red River which, in turn, got its name from the discolouration caused by mining effluent. The river's earlier name was Dowr Coner.

== History ==
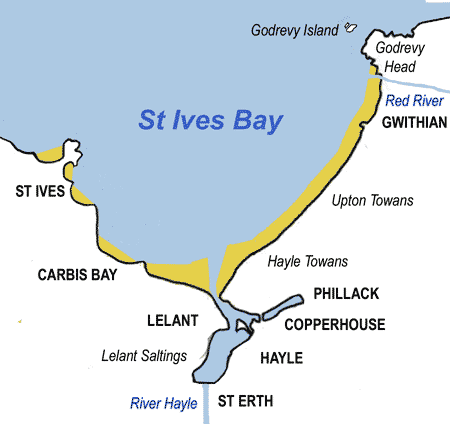
Sketch map of St Ives Bay

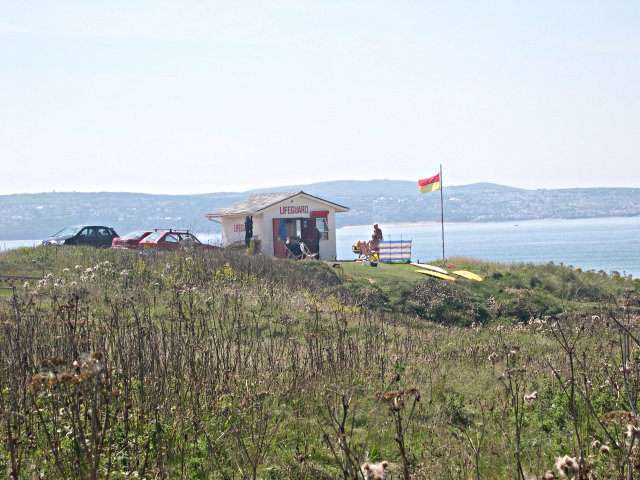
The lifeguard station on Gwithian Towans

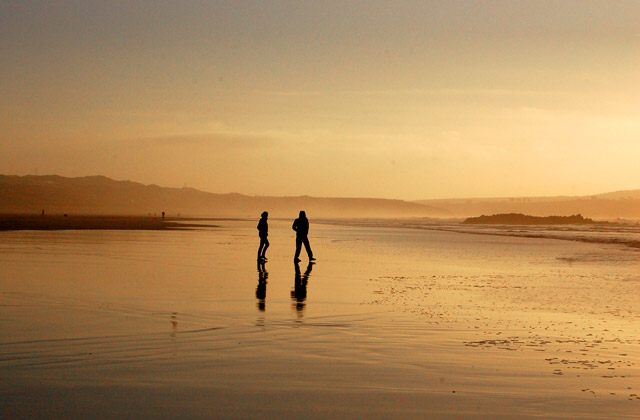
Evening on Gwithian beach with Ceres Rock in the middle distance

Gwithian Towans cover the site of a Bronze Age farm which has been excavated although no remains are visible. The church and relics of St Gwithian or Gocianus, built in 490, were uncovered from the beach and dunes during the early part of the 19th century, but were then allowed to be reclaimed by the shifting sands. Gwithian is the patron saint of good fortune on the sea. Charles Henderson wrote in 1925 that the "oratory ... is more perfect than the Oratory at Perran, having been less meddled with, though it is probably not so ancient". According to H. O'Neill Hencken there is the "remains of church, possibly early, buried in sand".

According to tradition there was in the sandy waste between the village and the sea a city of Connor. From Norman times there was a manor here called Connerton which was the paramount manor of the hundred of Penwith. The lords of the manor were bailiffs of the hundred and they held courts and enjoyed the rights of wreck for the coast between Porthtowan and Prussia Cove at least so late as 1580. The importance of this manor may have derived from it being the seat of a Celtic prince in early times. The current church was established further inland in the 15th-century but only a few fragments of this building remain incorporated in the lychgate of Edmund Sedding's church of 1866 (the tower however is the original one of the 15th century.)

The Hundred of Penwith had its ancient centre at Connerton, now buried beneath the sands of Gwithian Towans. (A hundred was a former Celtic 'keverang', an administrative unit which was sub-divided into tithings.) In the Geld Inquest of 1083, only seven hundreds are found in Cornwall, identified by the names of the chief manors of each: Connerton, Winnianton, Pawton, Tybesta, Stratton, Fawton and Rillaton (corresponding to Penwith, Kerrier, Pydar, Powder, Trigg, West Wivel and East Wivel). Connerton was held at the time of the Domesday Survey by King William and had been held by Brictric and then by Queen Matilda before him. In 1086 there was land for 40 ploughs and 30 villagers, 20 smallholders and 30 serfs are recorded. There was a mill, 300 sheep, 40 wild mares and 21 other animals. The institutions of the hundred were moved to Penzance in 1771 (or earlier) following large successive inundations of blown sand. A portion of the manor at Connor Downs was sold by auction in 1883; the mineral and manorial rights were not sold with the land.

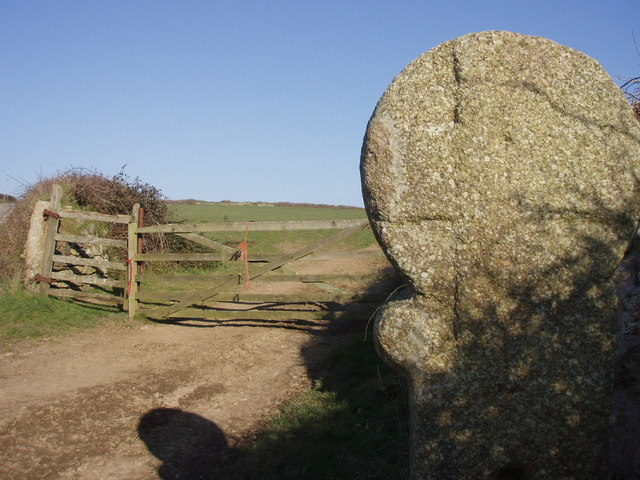
A Cornish cross just off a footpath leading east above the Red River valley near Gwithian

There is a Cornish cross in the churchyard.

Chesten Marchant, who died in 1676 at Gwithian, is believed to have been the last monoglot Cornish speaker (as opposed to Dolly Pentreath of Paul who could speak English as well).

== Media ==
The local community radio station is Coast FM (formerly Penwith Radio), which broadcasts on 96.5 and 97.2 FM.

== Tourism ==
A short distance to the east of the village is Gwithian Towans (compare Welsh 'tywyn' meaning a sand-dune), which is an area of coastal duneland that forms part of The Towans. Gwithian Beach stretches three miles from the Hayle River mouth to the Red River mouth at Godrevy. The beach is popular throughout the year with surfers, windsurfers, and other beachsport enthusiasts. Gwithian beach is patrolled by RNLI lifeguards from Easter to September and surfing equipment can be purchased or hired from the nearby surf shop.

== Gallery ==
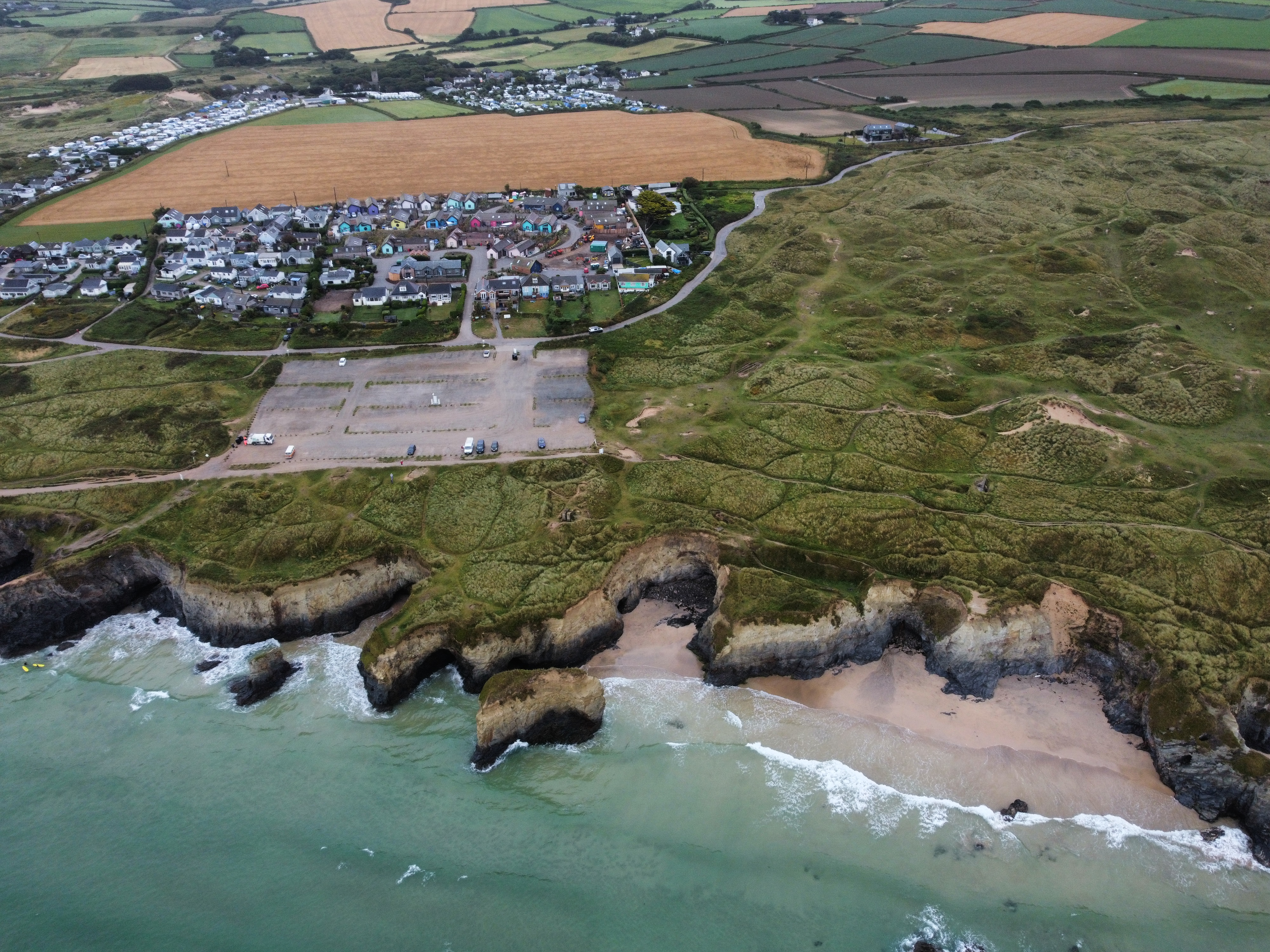

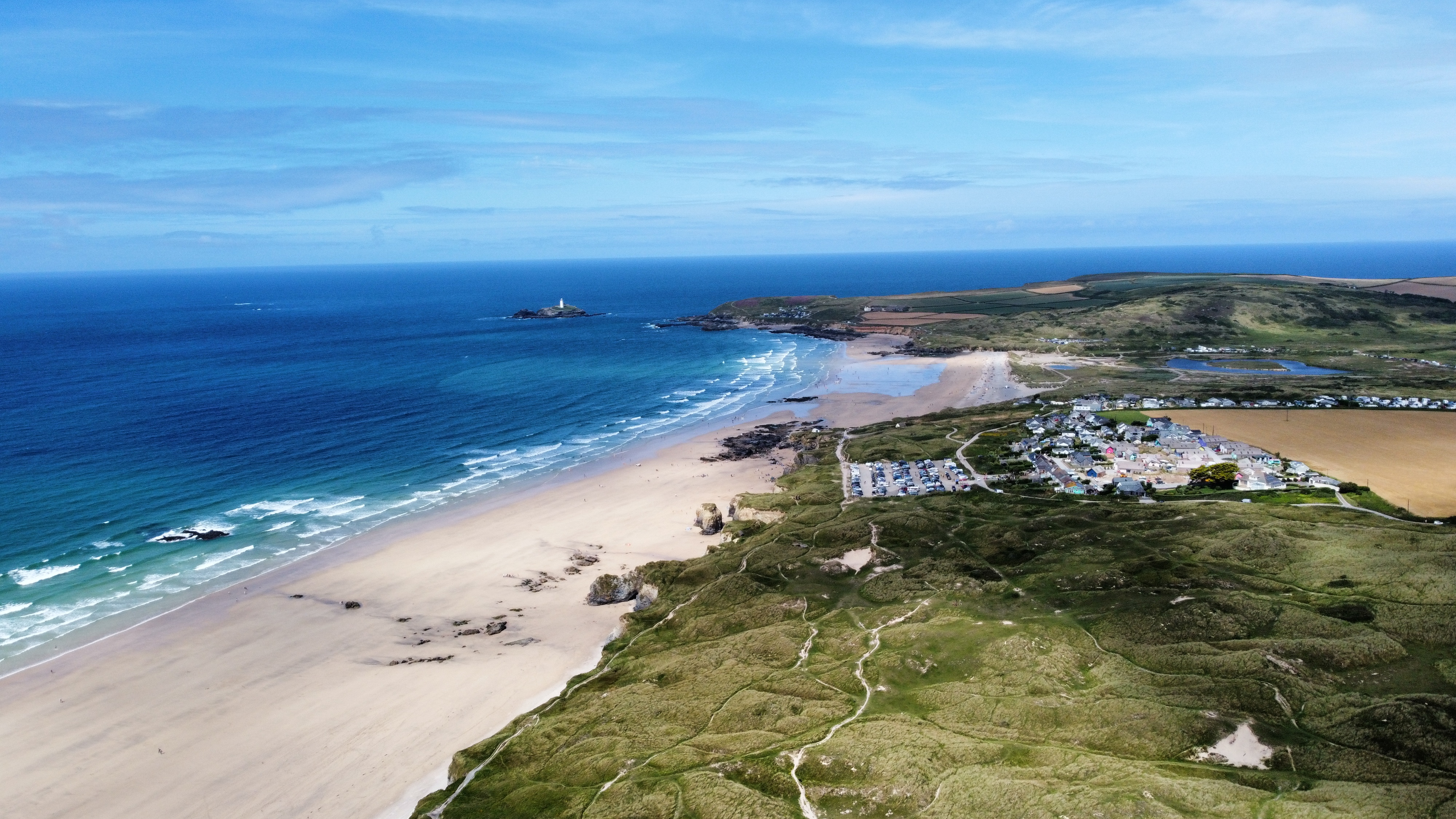

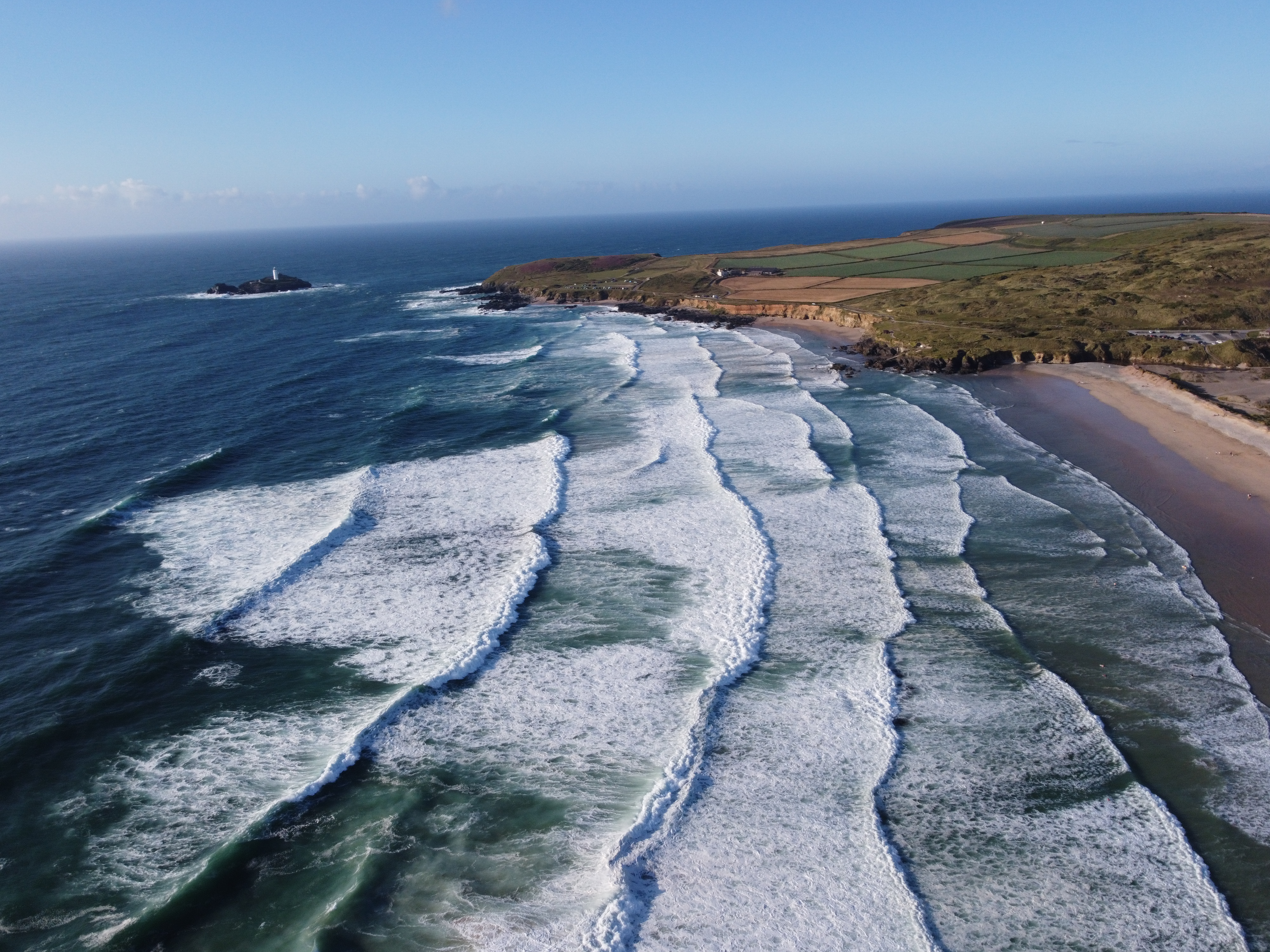

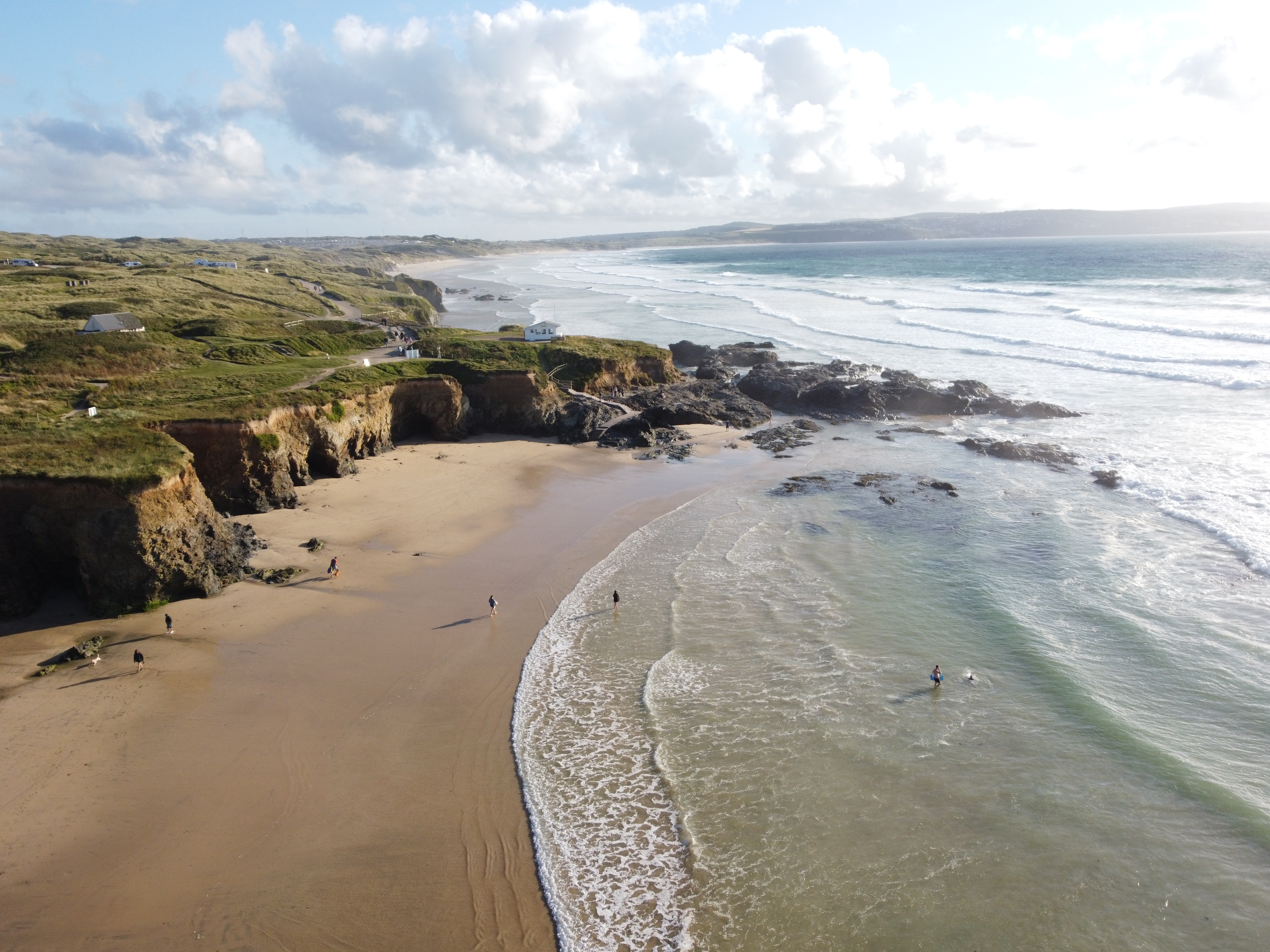

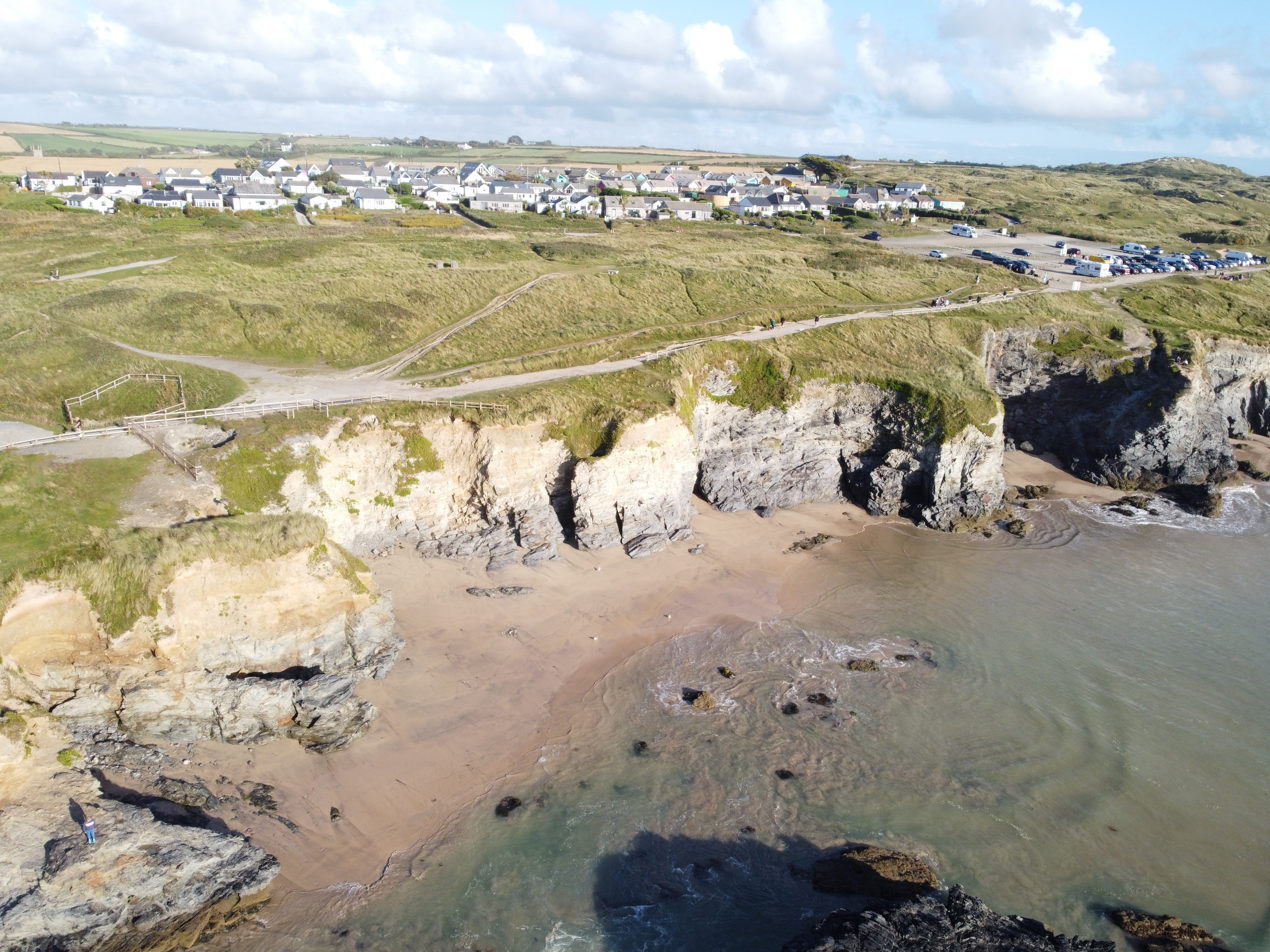
