= Connor Downs =

Village in west Cornwall, England

Coordinates: 50.2039°N 5.3741°W

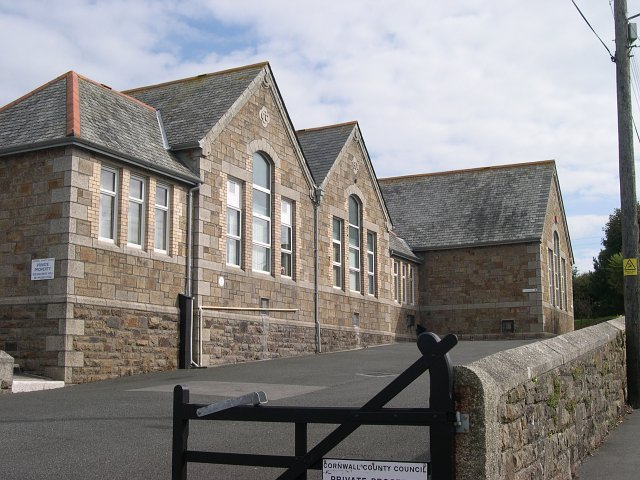
Connor Downs Primary School

Connor Downs (Cornish: Goongoner) is a village in west Cornwall, England, United Kingdom, in the civil parish of Gwinear-Gwithian. It is situated approximately two miles (3 km) east of Hayle and about two miles south-southeast of Gwithian churchtown. The name "Connor" was originally the name of Connerton, the medieval manor of the parish of Gwithian.

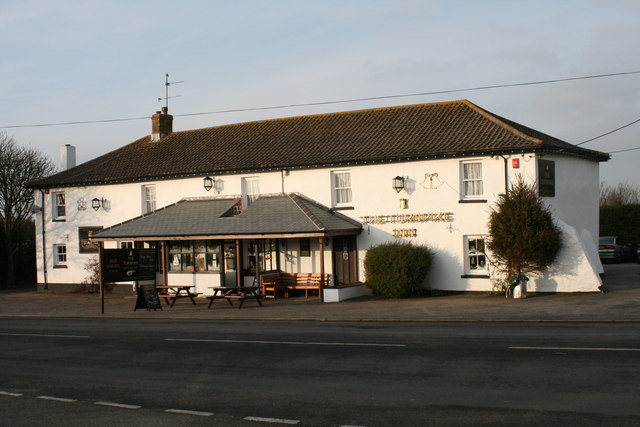
The Turnpike Inn, Connor Downs

The village straddles the old course of the A30 road but has now been bypassed and the new road passes to the north. Facilities include a school (Connor Downs Primary School), a spar petrol station, a pub, a Sunday school and a garage.
