= St Gothian's Church, Gwithian =

Church in Cornwall, England

St Gothian's church, Gwithian
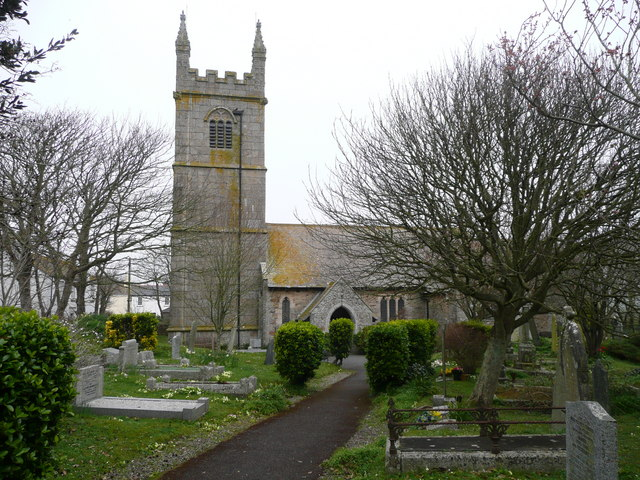
- St Gothian's church, Gwithian
- St Gothian's church, Gwithian
- 50°13′19″N 5°23′06″W
- Location: Gwithian
- Country: England
- Denomination: Church of England

History
- Dedication: Saint Gothian or Gwithian

Architecture
- Heritage designation: Grade II* listed

Administration
- Province: Province of Canterbury
- Diocese: Diocese of Truro
- Archdeaconry: Cornwall
- Deanery: Penwith
- Parish: Gwithian

Listed Building – Grade II*
- Official name: Church of Saint Gothian
- Designated: 14 January 1988
- Reference no.: 1327619

St Gothian's Church, Gwithian is a Grade II* listed parish church in the Church of England Diocese of Truro in Gwithian, Cornwall, England, UK. Nothing is known about St Gothian, Gocianus or Gwithian.

== History ==
The church dates from the 13th century. The tower is 15th century, but most of the church was rebuilt by Edmund Sedding in 1865–1867. The south aisle and arcade were removed and a new south transept was built. The shafts, capitals and bases of the arcade were preserved and used in the construction of a new Lych-gate. The north and south walls of the nave, the transepts and a portion of the chancel were rebuilt. The aumbry from the north transept was restored. A two light window, placed in the south aisle by the Rector a few years previous, was moved to the north wall of the north transept. The end window of the south transept was new. The window in the south wall was filled with stained glass designed by Sedding and made by Mr. Beer of Exeter in memory of the deacon and curate, Mr. Drury, who drowned in 1865. The old north and south doorways were rebuilt. The tower was reopened and the arch thrown into view. The pinnacles of the tower were repaired. The roofs of the nave, transepts and chancel were replaced. The chancel roof was embellished with carving from timber taken from the church at Phillack, which had been restored 10 years before. The reredos was painted by John Sedding, brother of the architect.

== Parish status ==
The church is in a joint parish served by the Godrevy team ministry with:

- St Erth's Church, St Erth
- St Elwyn's Church, Hayle
- St Felicitas and St Piala's Church, Phillack
- St Gwinear’s Church, Gwinear

== Organ ==
The church contains an organ by Cousans Sons and Co. A specification of the organ can be found on the National Pipe Organ Register.

== See also ==
- St Gwithian's Oratory
