= Carnhell Green =

Hamlet in Cornwall, England

Coordinates: 50.1887°N 5.3399°W

Carnhell Green: Cornish: Glesin Karnhel
- Location within Cornwall
- Unitary authority: Cornwall
- Ceremonial county: Cornwall
- Region: South West
- Country: England
- Sovereign state: United Kingdom
- Police: Devon and Cornwall
- Fire: Cornwall
- Ambulance: South Western
- UK Parliament: St Ives

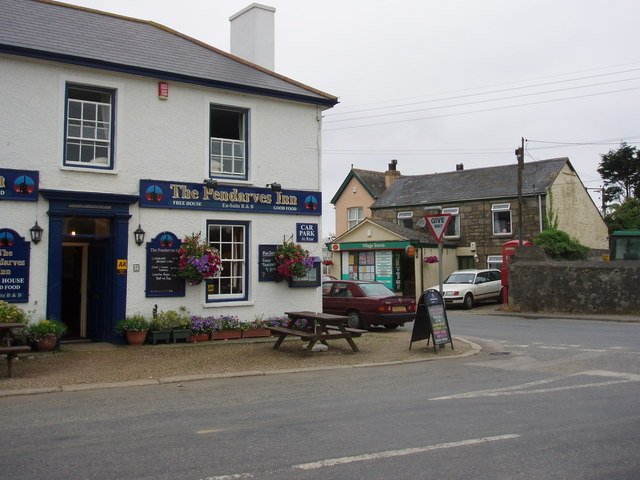

Carnhell Green (Cornish: Glesin Karnhel, meaning the green area of the cairn of the hall ) is a hamlet in west Cornwall, England, United Kingdom. It is situated approximately three miles (5 km) southwest of Camborne at grid reference SW 617 374. It is in the civil parish of Gwinear-Gwithian.

== Cornish wrestling ==
Cornish wrestling tournaments, for prizes, were held in Carnhell Green in the 1800s and 1900s.
