= Reawla =

Hamlet in Cornwall, England

Coordinates: 50.1789°N 5.3565°W

Reawla: Cornish: Riwella
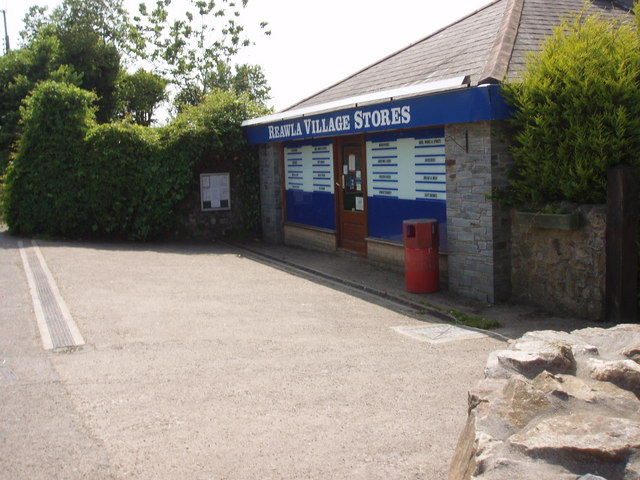
- Reawla Village Stores

- Location within Cornwall
- OS grid reference: SW604363
- Civil parish: Gwinear-Gwithian
- Unitary authority: Cornwall
- Ceremonial county: Cornwall
- Region: South West
- Country: England
- Sovereign state: United Kingdom

Reawla (Cornish: Riwella) is a hamlet in Penwith district (Cornish: Pennwydh) in Cornwall. It is in the civil parish of Gwinear-Gwithian.

The name Reawla comes from the Cornish language words riwel, meaning 'royal', and la, meaning 'place'.
