= Malachy Hitchins =

English astronomer and cleric

Malachy Hitchins (1741–1809) was a Cornish astronomer and cleric.

== Life ==
The son of Thomas Hitchins, he was born at Little Trevince, Gwennap, Cornwall, and was baptised on 18 May 1741; Thomas Martyn, compiler of a map of Cornwall, was an uncle, and Henry Martyn a cousin. According to his friend Richard Polwhele, Hitchins when young worked as a miner, then went to Exeter to assist Benjamin Donn with his map (1765) of Devon; by 1761 he had contributed mathematical replies to The Ladies' Diary. In December 1762 he was living at Bideford.

On 10 October 1763 Hitchins matriculated at Exeter College, Oxford; Polwhele says that the expenses of his university education were met by his wife. Hitchins did not, however, graduate B.A. till 27 February 1781; in 1785 he was incorporated at St John's College, Cambridge, where he graduated M.A. in the same year.

In 1767 Hitchins obtained an introduction to Nevil Maskelyne, and became computer at Greenwich Royal Observatory. For some time he lived there, and during 1769 observed stars, planets, and the transit of Venus. In 1768 Hitchins became comparer, and in this capacity verified the calculations for the Nautical Almanack, work which he performed for the rest of his life. While at Greenwich he entered holy orders, and moving to Exeter was for a short time vicar of Hennock. On 6 November 1775 Bishop Frederick Keppel presented him to the vicarage of St Hilary, Cornwall, and on 23 May 1785 to that of Gwinear.

Hitchins retained both his livings till his death, which took place on 28 March 1809 at St Hilary. He was buried in the parish church.

== Works ==
Hitchins assisted in Richard Polwhele in his History of Cornwall. His publications consisted of contributions to the Annual Register, Philosophical Transactions, and Archæologia.

== Family ==
Hitchins married Joanna Hawkins on 10 January 1764 at Buckland Brewer, Devon, and they had four sons. The eldest, Richard Hawkins Hitchins (1764–1827), was a fellow of Exeter College, Oxford, and rector of Baverstock in Wiltshire. The youngest, Fortescue Hitchins (1784–1814), born at St Hilary on 22 February 1784, became a solicitor at St Ives, Cornwall and died at Marazion on 1 April 1814. He published:

- Visions of Memory, and other Poems, Plymouth, 1803.
- The Seashore, with other Poems, Sherborne, 1810.
- The Tears of Cornubia; a Poem, Sherborne, 1812.

He compiled material for a history of Cornwall, which after his death was edited by Samuel Drew, and published in 1824.

== Notes ==
Attribution

This article incorporates text from a publication now in the public domain: Lee, Sidney, ed. (1891). "Hitchins, Malachy". Dictionary of National Biography. Vol. 27. London: Smith, Elder & Co.
