= St Felicitas and St Piala's Church, Phillack =

Church in Cornwall, England

St Felicitas and St Piala’s Church, Phillack
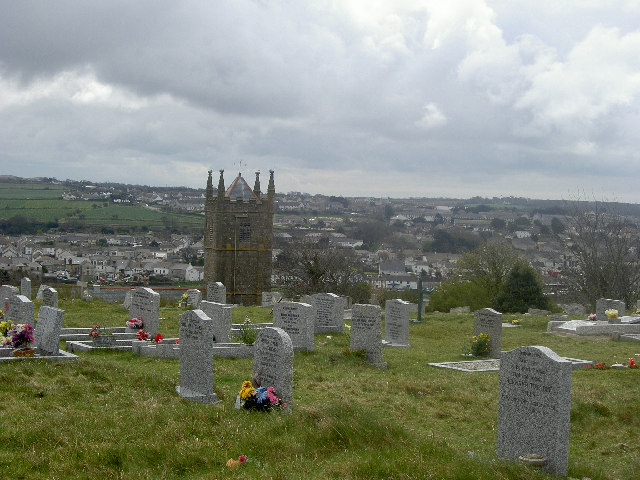
- St Felicitas and St Piala’s Church, Phillack
- St Felicitas and St Piala’s Church, Phillack
- 50°11′46.63″N 5°24′52.48″W
- Location: Phillack
- Country: England
- Denomination: Church of England

History
- Dedication: St Felicitas and St Piala

Administration
- Province: Province of Canterbury
- Diocese: Diocese of Truro
- Archdeaconry: Cornwall
- Deanery: Penwith
- Parish: Phillack

Listed Building – Grade II*
- Official name: Church of St Phillack (St Felicitas)
- Designated: 14 January 1988
- Reference no.: 1160143

St Felicitas and St Piala’s Church, Phillack is a Grade II* listed parish church in the Church of England Diocese of Truro in Phillack, Cornwall, England, UK.

== History ==
The church dates from the 12th century. The tower is 15th century. It was rebuilt between 1856 and 1857 by William White and re-consecrated on 12 May 1857.

== Parish status ==
The church is in a joint parish with

- St Erth's Church, St Erth
- St Gwinear’s Church, Gwinear
- St Elwyn's Church, Hayle
- St Gothian's Church, Gwithian

== Organ ==
The church contains an organ by Heard and Son of Truro dating from 1905. A specification of the organ can be found on the National Pipe Organ Register.

== Links ==
- St Felicitas and St Piala's Church, Phillack at Find a Grave
