= The Mining Journal (trade magazine) =

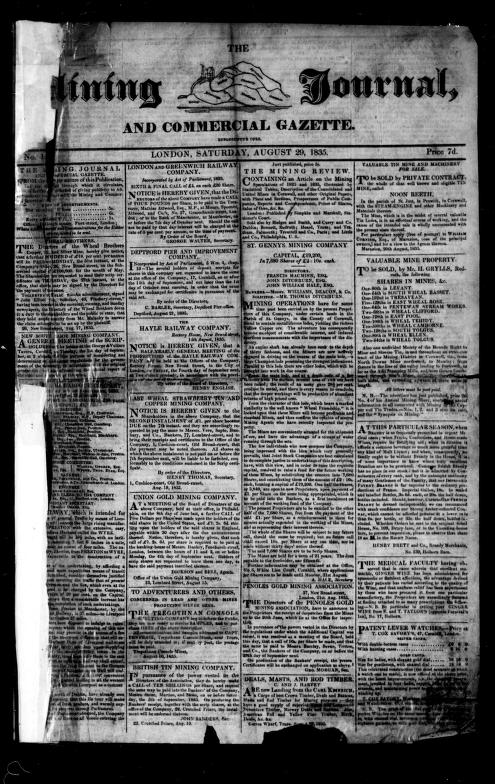
- The editio princeps of the Mining Journal and Commercial Gazette (29 August 1835)
- Editor: Henry English
- Categories: Mining, Railways, Stockbrokering
- Frequency: Weekly
- Format: Broadsheet
- First issue: 29 August 1835
- Company: Aspermont Media Ltd
- Country: United Kingdom
- Based in: London
- Language: English
- Website: https://www.mining-journal.com/

The Mining Journal is a magazine that covers global mining investment, finance, and business.

== Origins ==
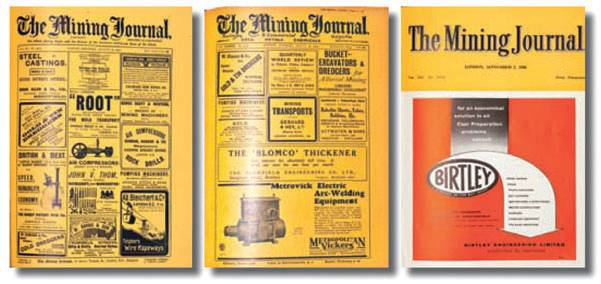
Early edition covers from the Mining Journal archives

The Mining Journal was founded in 1835 in London by Henry English, a London stockbroker under the name of Mining Journal and Commercial Gazette. In 1860, it was renamed to The Mining Journal, Railway and Commercial Gazette. Its name was changed to The Mining Journal in 1910. In the early days of The Mining Journal, then known as The Mining Journal and Commercial Gazette, it carried information on a range of subjects, from mines, machinery and metals prices, to news items and stories of general interest. The early issues also provided a glossary of mining terms, updated regularly, and noted all known mine accidents.

In 1963, The Mining Journal Ltd took over rival publication Mining Magazine, which had been founded in 1909 by Herbert Hoover, later to become President of the US, while he was a mining engineer then working in London. In 1935, as a centenary edition, it launched Mining Annual Review and in the 1990s expanded through the launch of World Tunnelling, Geodrilling International, Mining Environmental Management (now Mining People and the Environment). "

In 1844, The Mining Journal successfully campaigned for the introduction of the first safety regulations for mines.

A large number of important inventions were introduced in the 1830s, and it is clear from the early issues that the founders – led by the first editor, Henry English – realized they were witnessing an evolution in mining.

Michael Coulson, author of The History of Mining, wrote that English believed with the Industrial Revolution in full swing and the mining industry providing the key raw materials driving industrialization, "a regular publication recording and commenting on the issues facing mining was long overdue".

"Exposed to the oxygen of publicity it was clear that all was not well with the UK's mining industry – its size, excepting coal, was inadequate to provide all the needs of rapidly growing industries such as iron, steel and engineering," Coulson wrote.

At the same time, coal mining in the UK was dangerous and fatalities unacceptably common in the fast growing industry.

English became something of a one-man protest movement and his commentaries became increasingly influential, culminating in his success in having a commission appointed to look into the Haswell Colliery disaster in Durham in 1844 following his direct appeal to Queen Victoria.

The Mining Journal continued to campaign for reform of the mining industry and English's efforts played a major part in the establishment of both the Royal School of Mines and the Camborne School of Mines.

The British Geological Survey also dates back 180 years, with the formation of the Ordnance Geological Survey in 1835. As indicated, The Mining Journal campaigned vigorously for greater safety in mines and for the establishment of mining schools – the Royal School of Mines opened in 1851 and Camborne School of Mines early in 1888.

It was owned and managed by independent company Mining Journal Limited, owned by the Baliol Scott family for many years, during which it acquired, and continued to publish Mining Magazine, a monthly publication launched by subsequent U.S. President Herbert Hoover when he was a London-based mining engineer, in 1909, until ownership was passed to Michael West, who ran it successfully for two decades. It was latterly passed on to Lawrence Williams, in conjunction with Michael West and Christopher Hinde as minority shareholders, who ran it for the next decade. During that period the company launched World Tunnelling, Geodrilling International, No-Dig International, World Gold and Mining Environmental Management magazines. In 2005, ownership was transferred to the publishing company, Mining Communications, which also produces Mining Magazine, Mining, People and the Environment, GeoDrilling International and World Tunnelling/Trenchless World. Since 2008, it has been owned by the Australian company Aspermont.

== List of Publications ==
Issues of the Mining Journal from No.1 (29 August 1835) to No.3201 (26 December 1896) were digitised from microfische and published on Archive.org in 2021. In addition to the complete series of weekley issues; volume indicies from 1951 (vol.236) to 1999 (vol.332) were also published. An online index of mining companies mentioned in the Mining Journal compiled by Alastair Neil is published by the Northern Mines Research Society.

Volume 1 (1835)
No.	Vol.	Year	Month	Date	Description
1	1	1835	August	25	First issue.
2	1	1835	September	05	
3	1	1835	September	12	
4	1	1835	September	19	
5	1	1835	September	26	
6	1	1835	October	3	
7	1	1835	October	10	
8	1	1835	October	17	
9	1	1835	October	24	
10	1	1835	October	31	
11	1	1835	November	7	
12	1	1835	November	14	
13	1	1835	November	21	
14	1	1835	November	28	
15	1	1835	December	5	
16	1	1835	December	12	
17	1	1835	December	26	
18	1	1835	December		
