= Gwinear–Gwithian =

Coastal civil parish in west Cornwall, England

Coordinates: 50°13′N 5°23′W

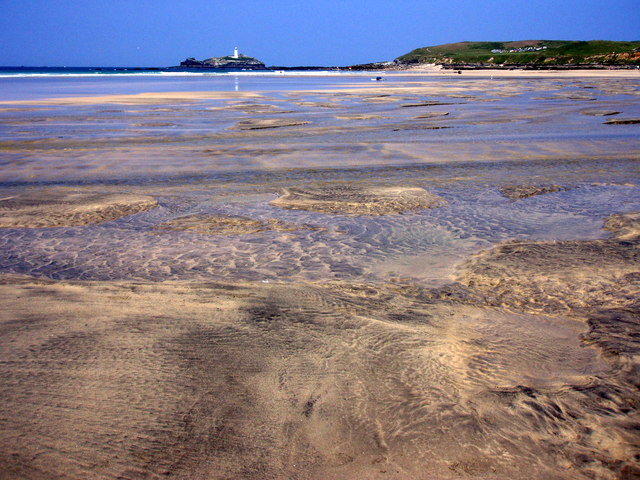
- Beach at Gwithian

- Location within Cornwall
- Population: 3,668 (2021 census)
- Civil parish: Gwinear–Gwithian
- Unitary authority: Cornwall
- Shire county: Cornwall
- Region: South West
- Country: England
- Sovereign state: United Kingdom
- Police: Devon and Cornwall
- Fire: Cornwall
- Ambulance: South Western

Gwinear–Gwithian (Cornish: Pluw Wynnyer ha Godhyan) is a coastal civil parish in west Cornwall, England, United Kingdom. It includes the villages of Connor Downs, Gwinear, Gwithian, Reawla and Rosewarne. The parish is situated approximately two miles (3 km) east of Hayle two miles (3 km) west of Camborne.

For the purposes of local government Gwinear–Gwithian has a parish council and elects councillors every four years. The principal local authority is Cornwall Council. The population of the parish was 3032 in the 2001 census. This included Fraddam and increased to 3,261 at the 2011 census. An electoral ward also exists with St. Erth added to the name. The population here in 2011 was 4,642.

== Notable buildings in Gwinear ==
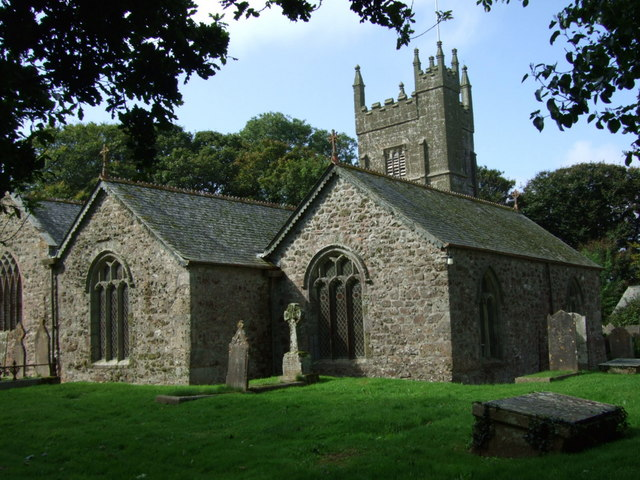
Gwinear parish church

The parish church of St Gwinear is a Grade I listed building. It dates from the 13th and 14th centuries, the tower being mid-fifteenth century, built in three stages out of granite stone. There are three aisles: the south aisle which is shorter than the nave, an inner north aisle, and further north the Arundell Aisle. The chancel was restored in 1870 and further restoration occurred between 1878 and 1879. The aisle and roofs were restored, with the four new roofs costing £689. A new window was added at the west end of the south aisle. The chancel screen was repaired and re-erected in its original position, enclosing the western bay of the chancel. New seating of pitch pine was provided. The church was reopened on 25 November 1879 and the new ring of bells were rung for the first time two months later.

Lanyon Farm and Polkinghorne Farm (both less than a mile from Gwinear Road Station) are both of the 17th century.

== Language ==
Gwinear was surveyed for the Survey of English Dialects.
