= St Erth =

Coordinates: 50.166°N 5.437°W

St Erth: Cornish: Lannudhno
- Location within Cornwall
- Population: 1,381 (2011 census including Canon's Town and Godsithney)
- OS grid reference: SW553349
- Unitary authority: Cornwall
- Ceremonial county: Cornwall
- Region: South West
- Country: England
- Sovereign state: United Kingdom
- Post town: HAYLE
- Postcode district: TR27
- Dialling code: 01736
- Police: Devon and Cornwall
- Fire: Cornwall
- Ambulance: South Western
- UK Parliament: St Ives

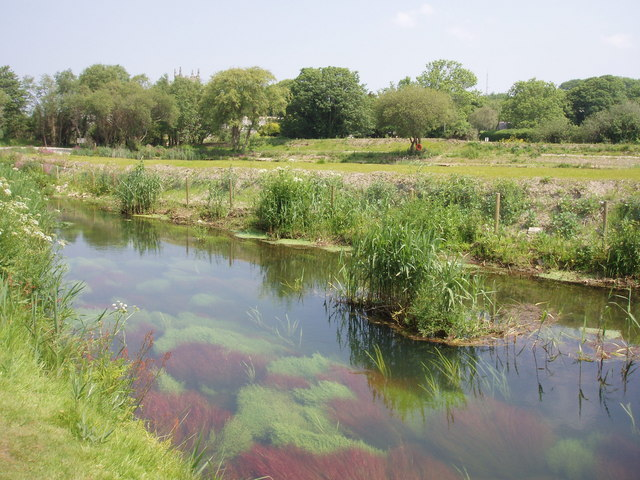
River Hayle near St Erth (church tower in distance)

St Erth (Cornish: Lannudhno) is a civil parish and village in Cornwall, England, United Kingdom.

St Erth takes its name from Saint Erc, one of the many Irish saints who brought Christianity to Cornwall during the Dark Ages, and is at the old crossing point of the River Hayle. The Cornish name of the place derives from St Uthinoch of whom little is known. The church of St Erth dates from the 15th-century, though an older church is said to have once stood on St Erth Hill overlooking the village.

The St Erth railway station is 0.75 miles from the village, at Rose-an-Grouse, and is on the Cornish Main Line from London Paddington to Penzance. It is also the junction for scenic St Ives Bay Line.

== Geography ==
The village is four miles (6.5 km) southeast of St Ives and six miles (10 km) northeast of Penzance. The parish shares boundaries with Ludgvan in the west, Hayle in the north, and St Hilary in the south.

The old coaching road once led through the village, before the building of the causeway in 1825 along the edge of the Hayle Estuary. Prior to 1825 anyone wanting to go from Hayle to St Ives or Penzance had to cross the sands of the Hayle Estuary or make a significant detour crossing the River Hayle at the ancient St Erth Bridge. The Star Inn, in St Erth village centre, is a Grade II listed building coaching inn dating from the fourteenth/fifteenth centuries. It was along this route that tin was carried upcountry from the stannaries of Penwith. Guides took travellers across the sands, but, even with guides, it was sometimes a perilous journey and the shifting sand and racing tide claimed several lives. Because of this major obstacle to trade, a turnpike trust was formed, with Henry Harvey a trustee, to build the causeway which now takes the road below the plantation west to the Old Quay House. Costing £5000 in 1825, the investors charged a toll to use the causeway to recover their costs.

St Erth was the site of a large creamery operated by United Dairies: this was responsible for processing a large quantity of milk produced in Penwith.

=== Manor houses ===
Trewinnard Manor is an early 18th-century house built on a different site from its medieval predecessor by the Hawkins family. Trelissick Manor is a medieval house remodelled in 1688 for the Jacobite James Paynter, again remodelled in the 18th century and extended in the 19th century. Tredrea Manor is a 17th-century house but it was largely rebuilt c. 1856. The front is of five bays built in ashlar.

=== St Erth Sand Pits ===
St Erth Sand Pits were worked for Pliocene sands and clays. The clay was used for fixing candles to miners' helmets and also for puddling the dry dock at Penzance. Later it was used by Bernard Leach at his pottery in St Ives. The clay was the source of significant fossil finds and in 1886 the Royal Society obtained a government grant to search the shell-beds. In 1962 the pits were designated a Site of Special Scientific Interest (SSSI). However, the main use of the sand in this location was for the metal foundries throughout Cornwall, but especially for Harvey's of nearby Hayle, and beyond. The sand grains are found coated with a thin film of clay. With gentle pressure and the correct percentage of water the sand grains will bind together and can be used for making a sand mould into which molten metals can be poured to make engineering castings. One of the disused pits is a geological nature reserve owned by Cornwall Wildlife Trust and part of St. Erth Sand Pits SSSI is owned by the Diocese of Truro (via their Diocesan Board of Finance). Another good source of clay for fixing candles to miners' helmets was on St Agnes Beacon.

== Parish church ==
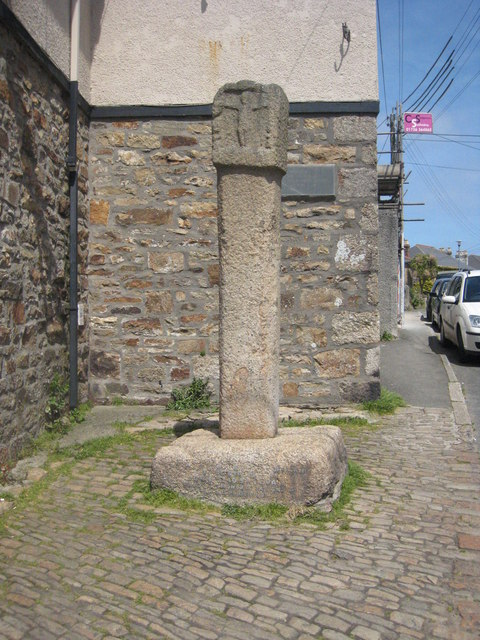
The cross in the churchtown

The parish church is dedicated to St Erc (Latin Ercus) and is probably of the 14th-century. It is not a large church and has a west tower of three stages. There are north and south aisles, the arcade in the north aisle having piers of two different types. The church was restored in 1874, at which time two dormer windows were inserted in the roof. The wagon roof of the south porch is old and the font is Norman and of an unusual square design. The ornate wooden roofs of the nave and aisles and fine oak screen decorated with the Four Evangelists are due to the restoration of 1874.

The church is sited in a wooded area and the churchyard, according to Charles Henderson, "greatly enhances the building". The names of eight places in the parish are recorded as having chapels or shrines in the medieval registers, including Bosworgey (St Mary Magdalene) and Gurlyn.

There are six Cornish crosses in the parish: two are in the churchyard and the others are in the churchtown and at Battery Mill, Tregenhorne and Trevean.

== Cornish wrestling ==
There have been Cornish wrestling tournaments, for prizes, have been held in St Erth at least throughout the last century. Tournaments have been held at the field at Treloweth, near St Erth station and at Tredrea Manor.

== Local government ==
For the purposes of local government St Erth forms a civil parish and elects eleven parish councillors every four years to St Erth Parish Council. The local authority is Cornwall Council.

== Twinning ==
St Erth has been twinned with Ploulec'h in Brittany, France since 1998.

== Notable people ==
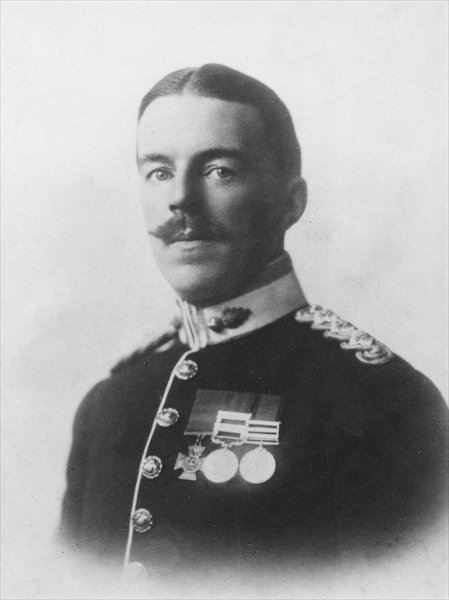
Herbert Augustine Carter VC, pre 1916

- The Rev. William Paynter, (1637 – 1716) Anglican clergyman and Vice-Chancellor of Oxford University was born at Trelissick Walbert, in the parish of St Erth.
- John Hawkins (1761–1841), geologist, traveller and writer.
- Davies Gilbert (1767–1839), Cornish engineer, author and politician, he lived in St Erth in family home of Tredrea.
- David Charleston (1848–1934), Australian politician, emigrated to Australia in 1884 and in 1901 he was elected to the Australian Senate
- Major Herbert Augustine Carter VC (1874 – 1916), son of the vicar of St Erth. Served in two campaigns in East Africa. He is buried at St Erth. His Victoria Cross is displayed at the Duke of Cornwall's Light Infantry Museum at Bodmin.
- Admiral Sir Bernard Rawlings (1889–1962), Royal Navy officer, became Flag Officer, Eastern Mediterranean during World War II.
- Sir John Nott (1932 – 2024), former British Conservative Party MP for St Ives from 1966 to 1983, Secretary of State for Defence during the Falkland war, lived on his farm in St Erth.
