= Godrevy =

Area on the eastern side of St Ives Bay, west Cornwall, England

Coordinates: 50.23828°N 5.39373°W

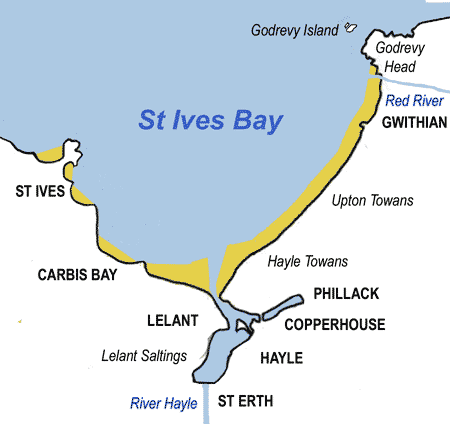
St Ives Bay showing Godrevy Head and Godrevy Island (top right)

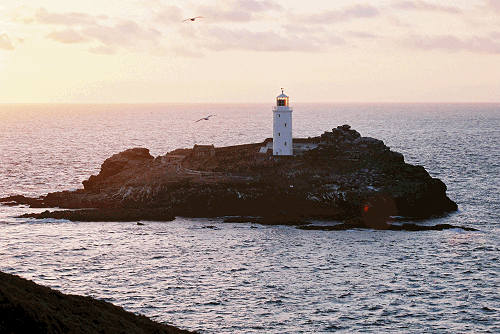
Godrevy Lighthouse at sunset, April 2007

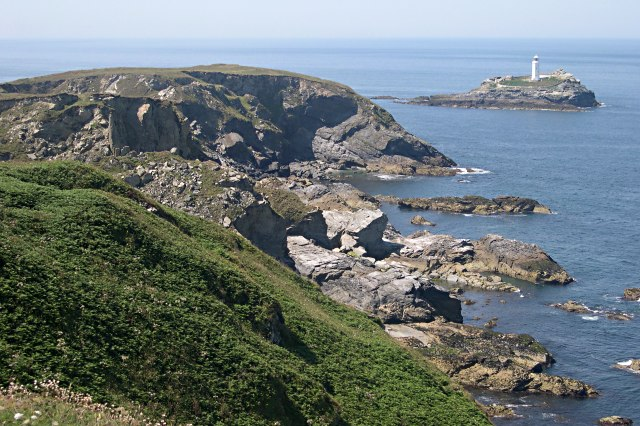
From the Knavocks to Godrevy Point

Godrevy (Cornish: Godrevi, meaning small farms) (English pronunciation: /ɡəˈdriːvi/ gə-DREE-vee) is an area on the eastern side of St Ives Bay, west Cornwall, England, United Kingdom, which faces the Atlantic Ocean. It is popular with both the surfing community and walkers. It is part owned by the National Trust, and offshore on Godrevy Island is a lighthouse maintained by Trinity House which is said to be the inspiration for Virginia Woolf's novel To the Lighthouse. Godrevy lies within the Cornwall Area of Outstanding Natural Beauty (AONB) and the South West Coast Path runs around the whole promontory. There are several public car parks on the western side where the National Trust owns and operates a café.

== Godrevy Head ==
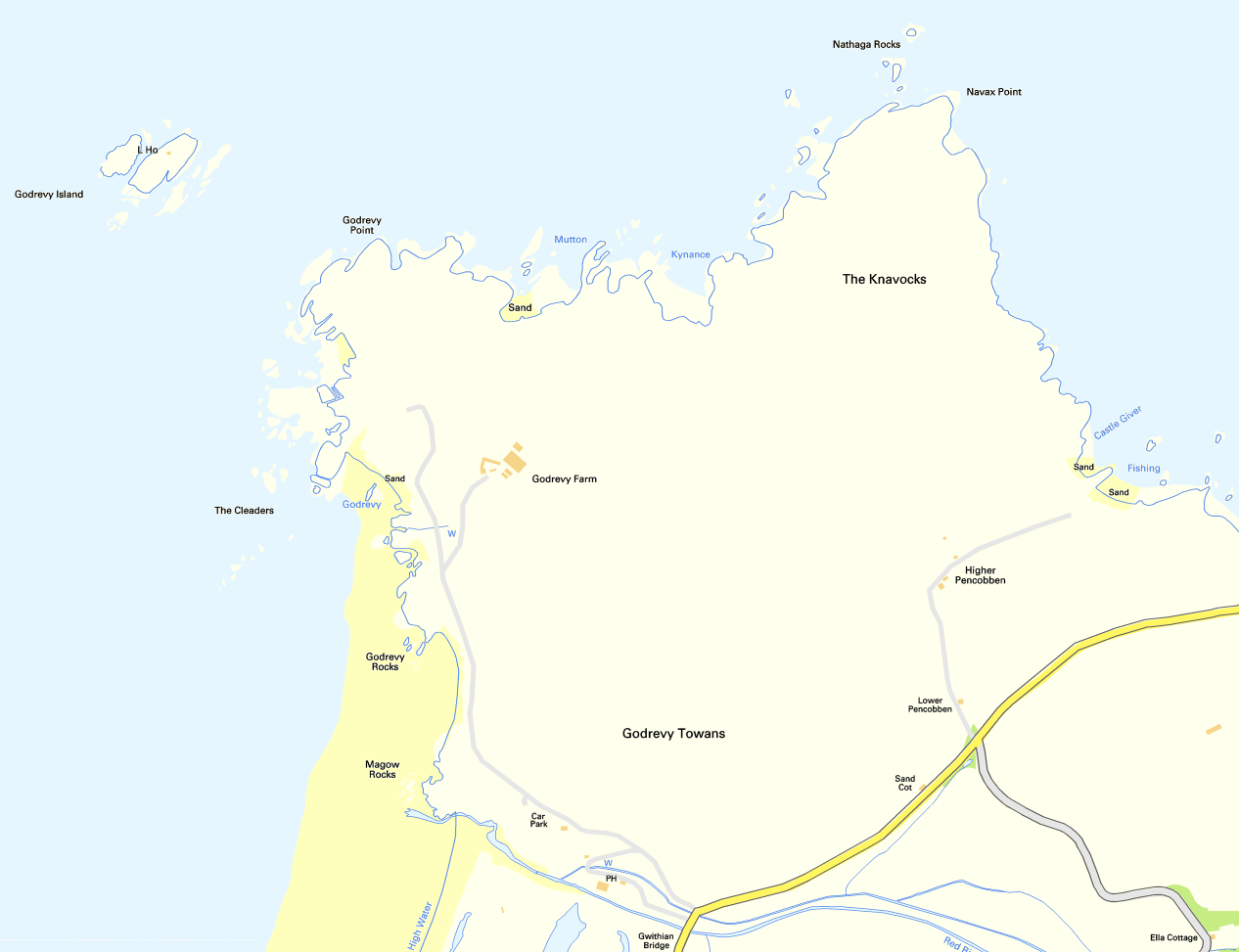
Map of Godrevy Head

The headland (grid reference SW580430) is on the Atlantic coast in Cornwall on the eastern side of St Ives Bay and about three miles (5 km) northeast of the town of Hayle. The nearest village is Gwithian, half a mile west beyond Godrevy Bridge across the Red River. The promontory is roughly square in shape and faces north into the Atlantic occupying an area of approximately 1-square-mile (2.6 km^{2}). In 1939, 320 acres (130 ha) and 5 miles (8.0 km) of coastline was donated to the National Trust by D. W. Thomas of Gwithian, followed by a further 19 acres (7.7 ha) of land adjoining Godrevy Farm in 1962 by Nicholas and Charles Thomas. Godrevy Head has some of the best coastal heathland in Cornwall, with many species of plant, animal and insect life. Part of the headland, along with the coast to the east, was designated as part of the Godrevy Head to St Agnes SSSI (Site of Special Scientific Interest) in 1951.

The western side of Godrevy Head is bounded by rocks to the north and a wide sandy beach to the south which is popular for surfing. At the north-western corner of the headland is Godrevy Point; at the north-eastern corner is Navax Point (Cornish: Penn Kynyavos, meaning head of the autumn dwelling). The cliffs between the two points are approximately 220 feet (67 m) above sea level.

On the northern side of the headland are two coves named Mutton Cove and Kynance Cove (Cornish: Porth Kynyavos, meaning cove of the autumn dwelling) beyond which the Nathaga Rocks (Cornish: Lethegow, meaning milky ones) lie off Navax Point. On the eastern side of the headland are Castle Giver Cove (Cornish: Porth Castel Gaver, meaning cove of the goat's castle) and Fishing Cove.

South of Navax Point is an area of heath named The Knavocks (Cornish: Kynyavos, meaning autumn dwelling) which is managed by The National Trust. The grassland and gorse scrub is criss-crossed with footpaths and is home to many species of butterflies and birds, notably nesting European stonechats. The Knavocks, like other coastal heathlands in Cornwall, is managed by regularly cutting back the gorse and by grazing, the National Trust having introduced a herd of ponies for the purpose.

Beyond Fishing Cove, the coast swings to the east towards Hell's Mouth and North Cliffs. The land here rises to approximately 290 feet (88 m), the highest point on this section of clifftop.

The cliffs, offshore rocks and coast around Godrevy Head form a renowned habitat for seabirds including cormorants, fulmars, guillemots, and razorbills and several species of gull. There is also a substantial population of grey seals throughout the year. Occasionally, bottlenose dolphins can be seen in the area.

== Godrevy Island and The Stones ==
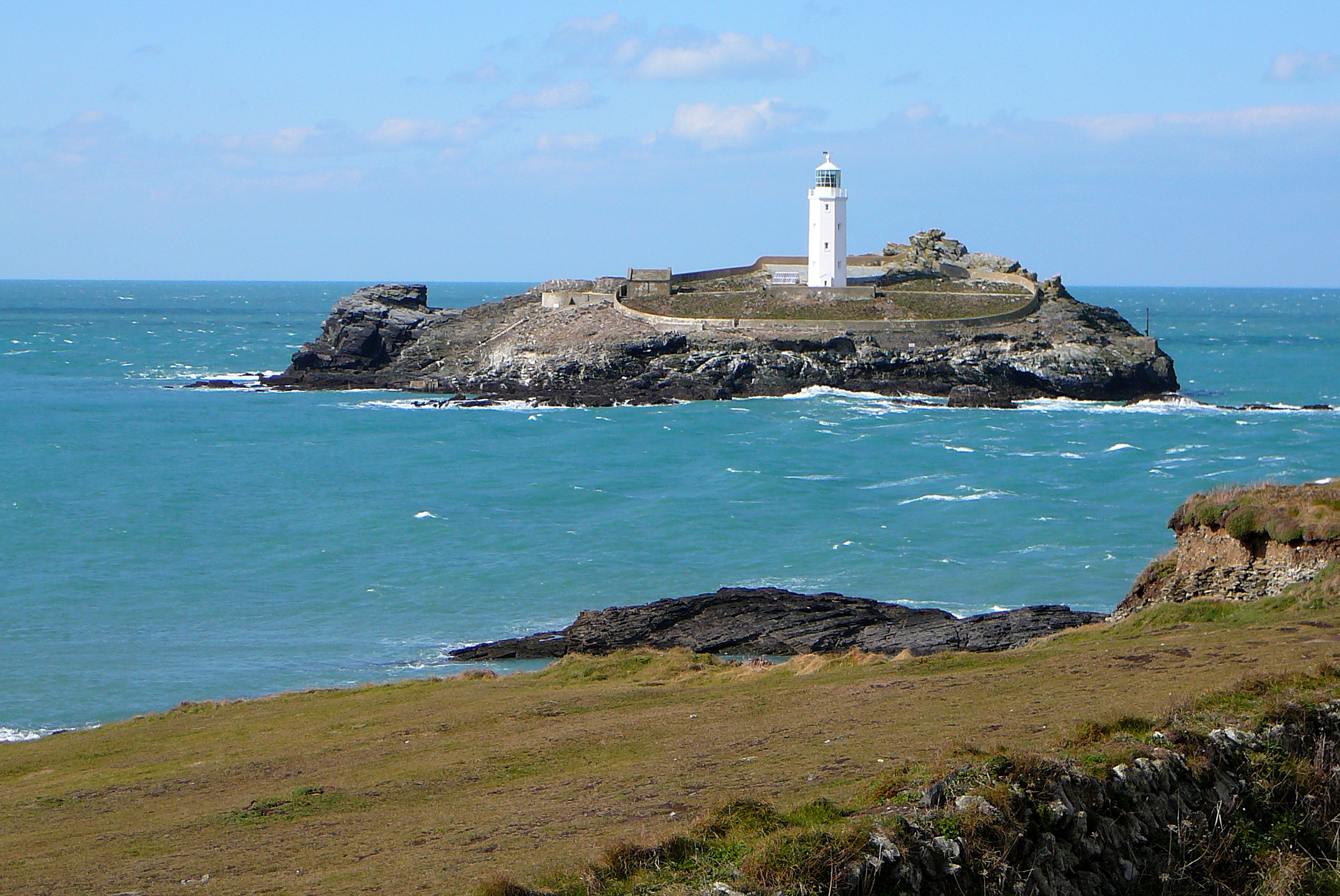
Godrevy Island.

Godrevy Island lies approx three hundred yards off Godrevy Point. The uninhabited island is the site of Godrevy Lighthouse, operated by Trinity House. The island covers an area of 12 acres (4.9 ha) and is home to seagulls, oystercatchers and pipits. Its vegetation is dominated by grasses, with primroses and sea thrift flowering in the spring. Landings may only be made on the island with the permission of Trinity House.

Seaward of Godrevy Island is a submerged reef known as The Stones, which extends for approximately 1 mile (1.6 km) to the northwest across the eastern approach to St Ives Bay. It has been the site of many sinkings over the years but it was not until the disastrous loss of the SS Nile on 30 November 1854, with the loss of all aboard, that Trinity House was pressured to construct a lighthouse on the island. It was built in 1859 and was converted to fully automatic operation in 1939.

== Geology ==
The rocks at Godrevy are Devonian mudstones overlain with Quaternary ice age deposits. The mudstone was laid in a deep sea sedimentary basin and subject to seismic activity, forming turbidites. Under gravitational slumping the coarser material settled first followed by the finer material.

Overlying the turbidites are a sequence of rocks laid down during recent ice ages, and Godrevy is considered to be one of the most important Pleistocene (2,588,000 to 11,700 years ago) sites in the south-west of England. Mammal fossils are rare in Cornwall and a dog was found within the poorly sorted, coarse-grained sediments of head dated between 12,000 and 15,000 years ago. The earliest evidence of canine domestication is a dog, or possible a wolf puppy, in a human burial site in Israel from 12,000 years ago. The earliest British domestic dog remains are from Starr Carr, Yorkshire, dated to 9,538 (± 350) BP. In order to date the skeleton and to test three hypotheses, part of a bone was sampled at the Oxford University Radiocarbon Accelerator Unit using accelerator mass spectrometry (AMS).

The three hypotheses were:

- if the skeleton is in context with the geology (i.e. the same age as the head deposits), then the deposits are younger than previously thought,
- if the dating of the head deposits is correct, then the dog is a very early example of domestication,
- if the skeleton is younger, it is not in context with the geology.

The dog skeleton dates to 1650 AD (± 30), which implies that it is possible for a recently dead animal to be within ice age deposits but leave no indication of how it happened. Fossil occurrence within ice age deposits need to be treated with caution, and skeletal remains need to be dated by AMS to provide their actual age and geological significance.

== Religion ==
The Godrevy team ministry within the Church of England Diocese of Truro includes five churches in the St Ives district.
