= Saint Gwinear =

Cornish saint

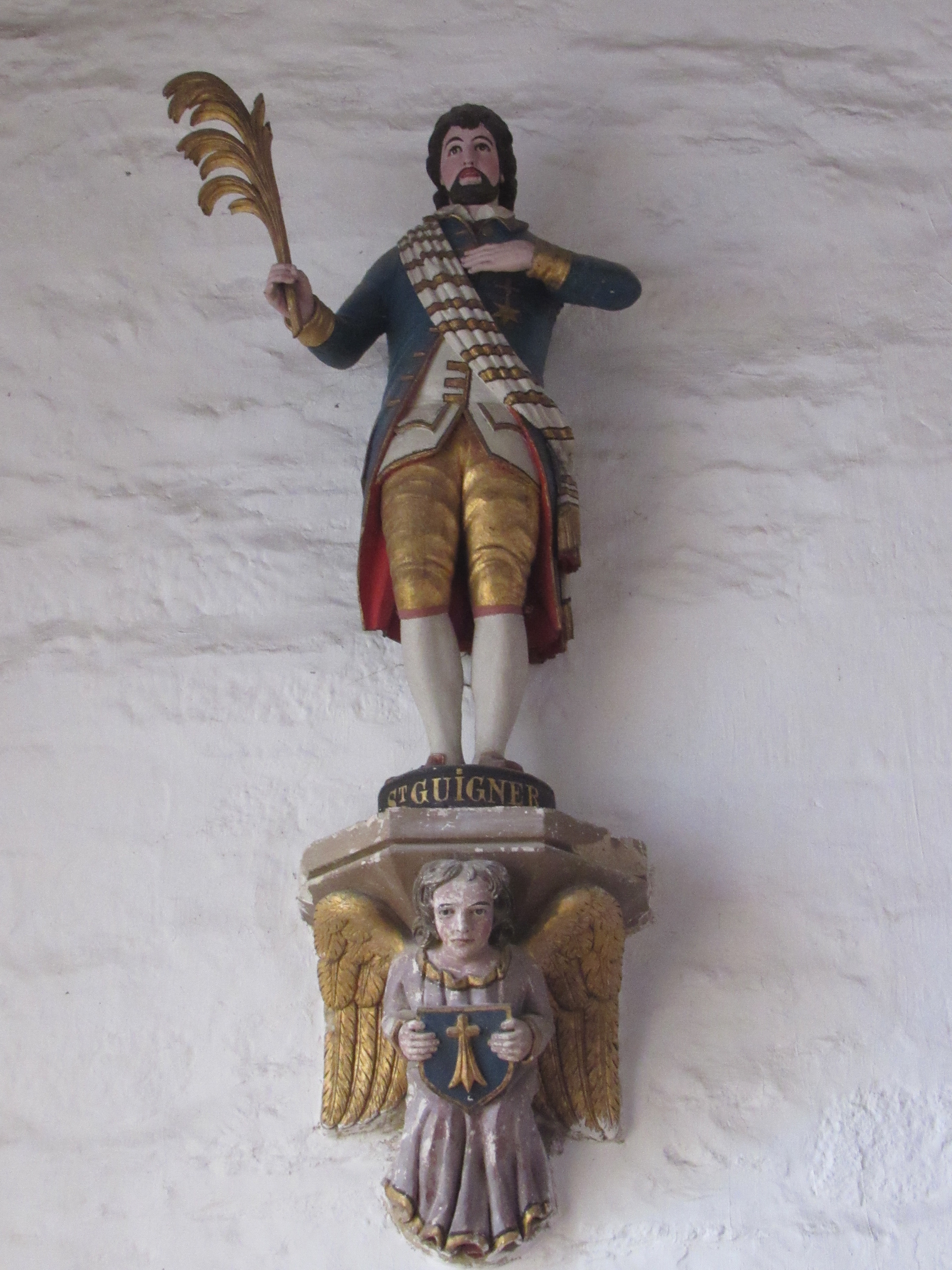
- Statue of St Gwinear at Pluvigner, Brittany

Martyr
- Born: Ireland
- Died: 6th century Hayle, Cornwall
- Venerated in: Catholic Church; Eastern Orthodox Church
- Canonized: Pre-Congregation
- Feast: 23 March

Gwinear, Guigner, was a Celtic martyr, one of only two early Cornish saints whose biographies survived the Reformation. The Life of Gwinear was written in the early 14th century by a priest named Anselm, and has sometimes been printed among the works of Anselm of Canterbury. (Note: Gilbert Hunter Doble (1960) includes a translation of a large part of the text in which the saint's name is given as Guigner; Doble suggests that this Breton form indicates a connection with Brittany where the saint is also venerated.) His feast day is March 23.

Born in Ireland with the Irish name of Fingar, he was converted to Christianity by Saint Patrick and after spending time in Brittany went with 7 (or 777) companions to Cornwall, landing at Hayle, where he was martyred by King Teudar. (Note: King Teudar also appears as a tyrant in the early 16th-century plays Beunans Ke and Beunans Meriasek, in which he comes into conflict with Saints Kea and Meriasek, respectively.) Gwinear was said to have died with his followers by being thrown into a pit of reptiles. An alternative version sets the story in Brittany with Guigner being martyred at the hands of Prince Tewdwr.

The Victorian clergyman, hagiographer and antiquary Sabine Baring-Gould believed that an Irish group, driven from their homeland in Ossory in the fifth century, invaded Penwith (="pen-gwaeth", the "bloody headland"), and that the legend of Gwinear was a distorted recollection of these events.
