= Cornish bagpipes =

Variety of bagpipes

Cornish bagpipes (Cornish: Pibow sagh kernewek) are the forms of bagpipes once common in Cornwall in the 19th century. Bagpipes and pipes are mentioned in Cornish documentary sources from c.1150 to 1830 and bagpipes are present in Cornish iconography from the 15th and 16th centuries.

== Early documentary references ==
Pipes, type unspecified, are mentioned in many medieval Cornish sources: The Cornish word piþhit (modern spelling pibydh 'piper'), glossing the medieval Latin lemma Tibicen, appears in the Vocabularium Cornicum of about 1150.

The first named 'piper' in Cornish records is that of Reginald Tibicen noted as holding land in Cuby before 1260/61. (probably a player of the flute or pipe, perhaps a bagpiper). The Accounts of the Earldom, 1296–7, mention Henri the pipere of Trigg: his wife Joan was paying a fine of 2s 6d. The assize record of the 1302 Cornwall Eyre mentions Osbmus Le Pibith and Richare/us Le Pybyth, both of Mousehole. A 1344 account tells of a disturbance at a Cornwall stannary in Redruth involving a man with the surname Pipere.

Pipers receive many mentions in Cornish-language plays from the 15th to early 17th centuries. These are:

- The Ordinalia, a trilogy of Biblical plays known individually as Origo Mundi (OM), Passio Christi (PC), and Resurrexio Domini (RD), written c. 1400, and known from a mid-fifteenth-century manuscript, Oxford MS. Bodl. 791.
- Beunans Meriasek (BM), ‘The Life of St. Meriasek’, MS written in 1504, but whose first ten pages were rewritten in the mid-sixteenth century.
- Bewnans Ke (BK), ‘The Life of St. Ke’, probably written c. 1500–20, and known only from a fragmentary and imperfect copy of the later 16th century.
- Gwreans an Bys (GB), also known by its English title Creacion of the World, MS written in 1611.

For example, Origo Mundi, Resurrexio Domini, Gwreans an Bys, and both halves of Beunans Meriasek (the latter play intended to be performed in two parts on two successive days) conclude with a speech in which a character urges the minstrels (menstrels) or pipers (pyboryon) to ‘pipe’ (peba) ‘so that we may go dancing’ (may hyllyn mos the thonssye, RD 2646; compare BM 2512, BM 4565, GB 2547).

The Records of Early English Drama conveniently summarise numbers of performances by Lord Botreaux's Pipers (sometimes also described as minstrels or servants) between 1416/7 and 1433. A piper was paid at Lostwithiel Riding in 1536/7. The 1549/50 Camborne churchwardens' accounts mention a pyper yn the playe. (Perhaps Beunans Meriasek, as Meriasek was their patron saint.) St. Ives Accounts for 1571/2 mention paying pypers for there wages in association with the performance of another play. These accounts do not tell us about the instruments used, except that they were conventionally referred to as pipes. Nonetheless, it is clear that the iconography of bagpipers in Cornwall does not exist in isolation, but in the context of a broad musical culture of which piping was a significant element.

== Late Medieval iconography ==
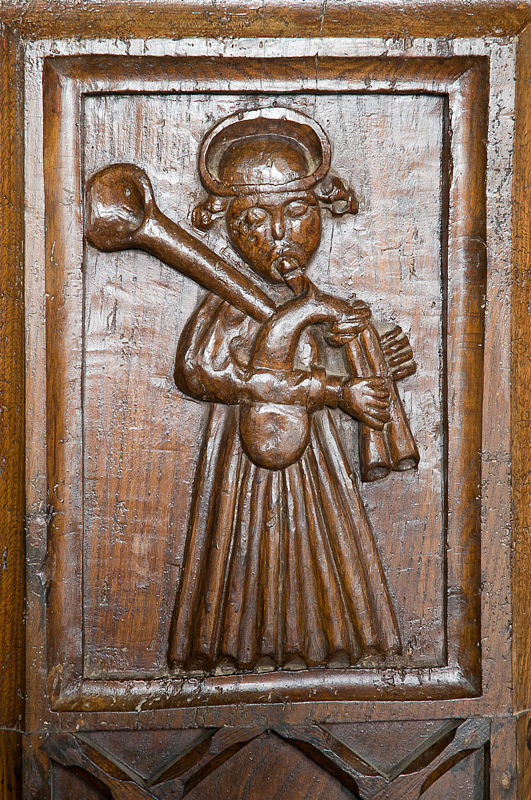
Cornish Piper on a bench end at Davidstow church

Twin-chanter bagpipes appear in late-Medieval iconography in churches at Altarnun, Davidstow, St Austell and Braddock, Cornwall and at Marwood, and Tavistock, Devon. A single chanter bagpipe and other instruments are depicted on the east wall of St Mary's, Launceston, Cornwall (c. 1520–1540). Such images must be considered with care.

The earliest representation, at St. Austell, is a 15th-century gargoyle, unique in Cornwall but still probably a stereotypical image created by the mason. The Davidstow image, perhaps mid- 16th century, and perhaps of an angel, may also be stereotypical. The bagpiping dog of Braddock is a stereotypical image found on European pilgrim brooches and elsewhere. Marwood is a biblical depiction with possibly a generic representation of the bagpipes. However, similar clothing detail at Altarnun and Launceston suggests that those images are indeed representative of local practice in c. 1520–1540. The Tavistock bagpiper looks like those of Altarnun and Launceston, but the carving lacks the detail to permit certainty.

== Later documentary references ==
Pipers were employed by William Thomas to entertain sheep shearers at Zennor as late as 1683.Thomas the piper is mentioned in the Bilbao MS of 1713. In 1830 an itinerant player of markedly quiet bagpipes, apparently disguised and wearing green spectacles, was noted playing for charity in Truro, Falmouth, Penzance and Bodmin. The report implied that such activity was unusual. The bagpiper's origin is not mentioned.

== Twin chanter pipes ==
Iconography of double chanter bagpipes and aulos was common 600 years ago. There are 'clusters' of such images in Yorkshire and Dorset as well as Cornwall. Perhaps remoteness or cultural introspection preserved such instruments in the South West when they died out elsewhere. The Launceston bagpipe has a conical bore chanter, which would give a loud, full tone often associated with outdoor performance. The bagpipe at Altarnun has parallel bore chanters which would give a quieter, reedy tone normally associated with indoor use. The asymmetrical chanters at Altarnun may be representative or a function of perspective. The lengths as now measured would give a pitch difference of about a tone.

== Modern Cornish bagpipes and bagpiping ==
Modern realisations of the two-chanter bagpipe have been created in small numbers since the late 20th century. The double chanter configuration permits interesting harmonies. One chanter plays the upper half of the octave, the other the lower half. Both chanters can play the tonic note and thus, using covered fingering, one can create a constant drone whilst playing the melody. This drone effect is a striking feature of the double chanter bagpipes. Such bagpipes are also good for low, rich accompaniments.

From the 1990s onward, pipemakers like Julian Goodacre have produced a number of Cornish double-pipes. In late 2009 the numbers playing bagpipes based on Cornish iconography was self-evidently small compared to those playing Scottish smallpipes or Northumbrian pipes. Merv Davey of Pyba has done much to explore the possibilities of these instruments. Cornish bagpipes are now played at the Cornish Gorsedh, replacing the brass bands used for processional purposes in the early 20th century.

== Historiography ==
Harry Woodhouse's Cornish Bagpipes: Fact or Fiction? provided an opening discussion of the historical references to piping in Cornwall. James Merryweather responded to this, emphasising that iconography of double chanter bagpipes is not unique to Cornwall, and that the term 'pipes' does not necessarily imply 'bagpipes'. Mike O'Connor revisited the topic emphasising the context provided by various documentary sources and the realistic dress detail at Altarnun and Launceston, which suggests that the images are of retained local musicians and represent Cornish practice of the early 16th century.

== Summary ==
Extensive documentary evidence confirms that piping was a central element in music-making in medieval Cornwall. While some iconography may be stereotypical, dress detail at Altarnun and Launceston suggests the images represent Cornish practice in the early 16th century. This practice involved both double and single chanter bagpipes. Double chanter bagpipes were not unique to Cornwall, but may have survived there longer than in Dorset or Yorkshire, perhaps due to Cornwall's isolation or to local favour. Whilst there is much evidence for bagpipes in late medieval times, the paucity of later reports suggest that Cornish bagpiping was then in decline. The late 20th century saw renewed interest in the history and practice of bagpiping in Cornwall, leading to reconstructions of pipes seen in Cornish iconography and exploration of technique and repertoire.
