= Meriadoc =

Meriadoc is a name of Brittonic origin, corresponding to Meiriadog in medieval and modern Welsh, Meryasek (or similar spellings) in Cornish, and Meriadek in modern Breton. It was Latinized as either Meridiadocus or Meriadocus.

Among the persons, real or otherwise, carrying the name "Meriadoc" or its variants, are:

- Conan Meriadoc, semi-mythical king of Brittany in Gaul
- Meriasek, Breton saint, patron of Camborne
- Beunans Meriasek, a Middle Cornish miracle play that relates the legends of the life of Saint Meriasek
- Meriadoc Brandybuck, character in J. R. R. Tolkien's The Lord of the Rings
