= Mystery play =

Medieval European play

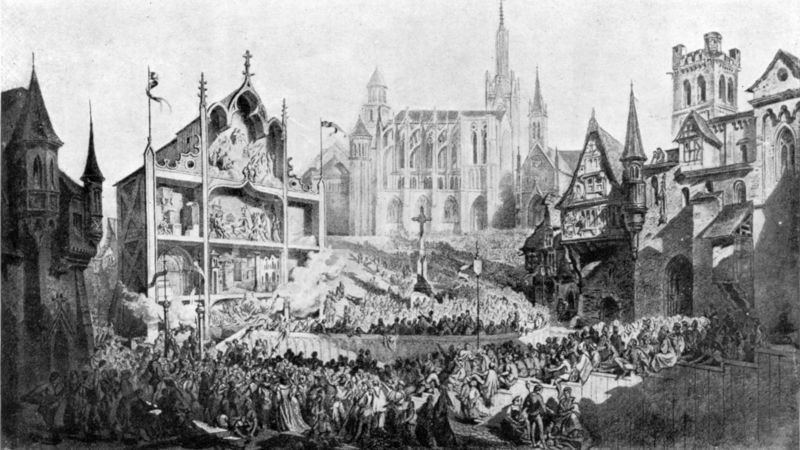
Depiction of a performance of the Mystery Play of Saint Clement in Metz during the Middle Ages.

Mystery plays and miracle plays are among the earliest formally developed plays in medieval Europe. Medieval mystery plays focused on the representation of Bible stories in churches as tableaux with accompanying antiphonal song. They told of subjects such as the Creation, Adam and Eve, the murder of Abel, and the Last Judgment. Often they were performed together in cycles which could last for days.

== Terminology ==
The term derives from the English word mystery (used in its religious sense, denoting a kind of miracle). An archaic sense of the word mystery means guild, referring to the people who put on the plays.

== Origins ==
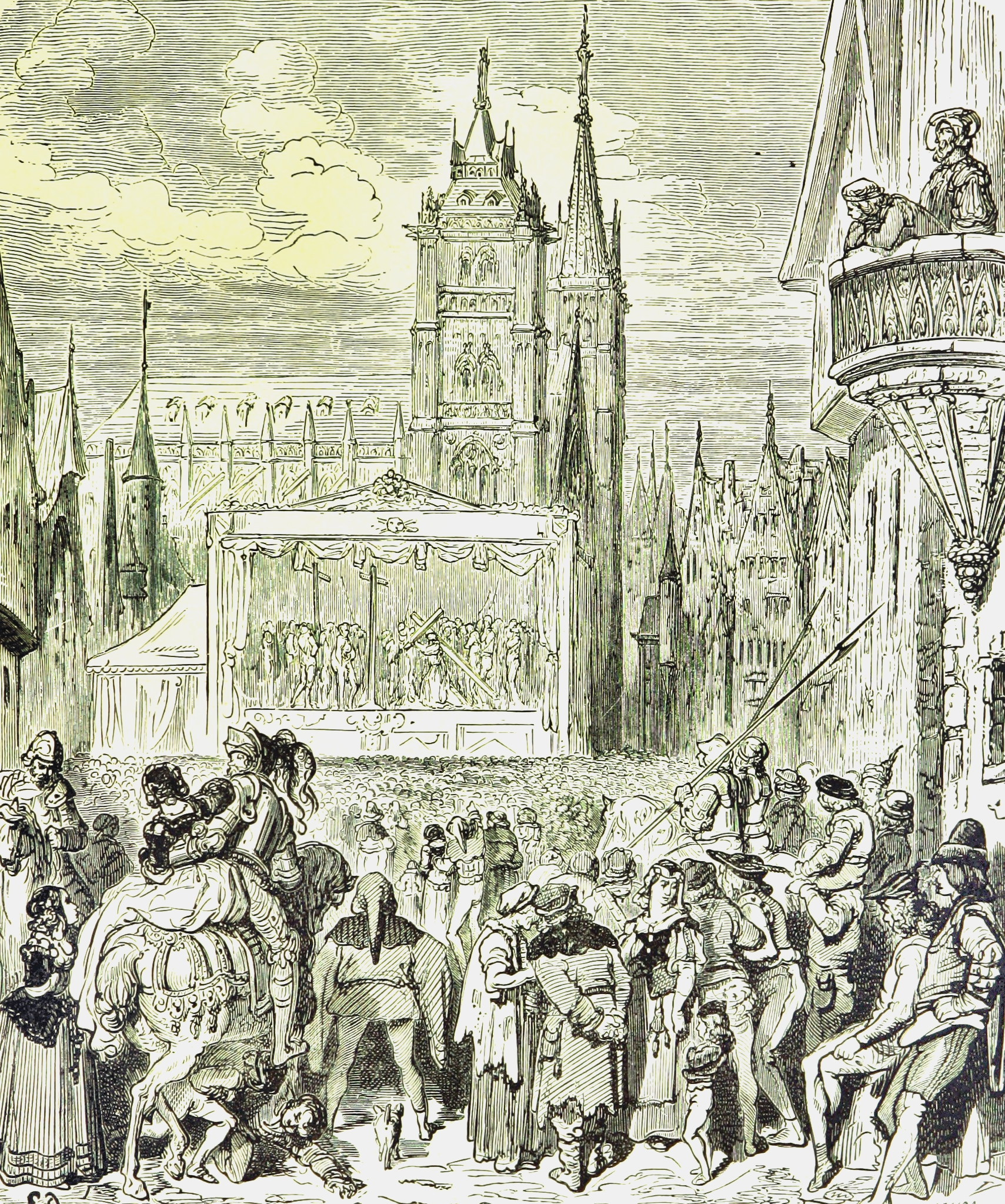
Mystery play, Flanders, 15th century

As early as the fifth century, living tableaux were introduced into sacred services. The plays originated as simple tropes, verbal embellishments of liturgical texts, and slowly became more elaborate. At an early period chants from the service of the day were added to the prose dialogue. As these liturgical plays increased in popularity, vernacular forms emerged, and travelling companies of actors and theatrical productions became common in the later Middle Ages.

The Quem quaeritis? is the best known early form of the dramas. It is a schematic dialogue between the angel at the tomb of Christ and the women who are seeking his dead body. Early forms of the responsorium were later elaborated with dialogue and dramatic action. Early performances were given in Latin, and were preceded by a vernacular prologue spoken by a herald who gave a synopsis of the events. The writers and directors of the earliest plays were probably monks or clerics.

In 1210, suspicious of the growing popularity of miracle plays, Pope Innocent III issued a papal edict forbidding clergy from acting on a public stage. This had the effect of transferring the organization of the dramas to town guilds, after which several changes followed. Vernacular texts replaced Latin, and non-Biblical passages were added along with comic scenes, for example in the Secunda Pastorum of the Wakefield Cycle. Acting and characterization became more elaborate.

These vernacular religious performances were, in some of the larger cities in England such as York, performed and produced by guilds, with each guild taking responsibility for a particular piece of scriptural history. The genre was again banned as a result of the Reformation and the establishment of the Church of England in 1534.

The mystery play developed, in some places, into a series of plays dealing with major events in the Christian calendar, from the Creation to the Day of Judgment. By the end of the 15th century, the practice of acting these plays in cycles on festival days was established in several parts of Europe. Sometimes, each play was performed on a decorated pageant cart that moved about the city to allow different crowds to watch each play. The entire cycle could take up to twenty hours to perform and could be spread over a number of days. Taken as a whole, these are referred to as Corpus Christi cycles. These cycles were often performed during the Feast of Corpus Christi.

The plays were performed by a combination of clerics and amateurs and were written in highly elaborate stanza forms; they were often marked by extravagant sets and special effects, but could also be stark and intimate. There was a wide variety of theatrical and poetic styles, even in a single cycle of plays.

== English mystery plays ==
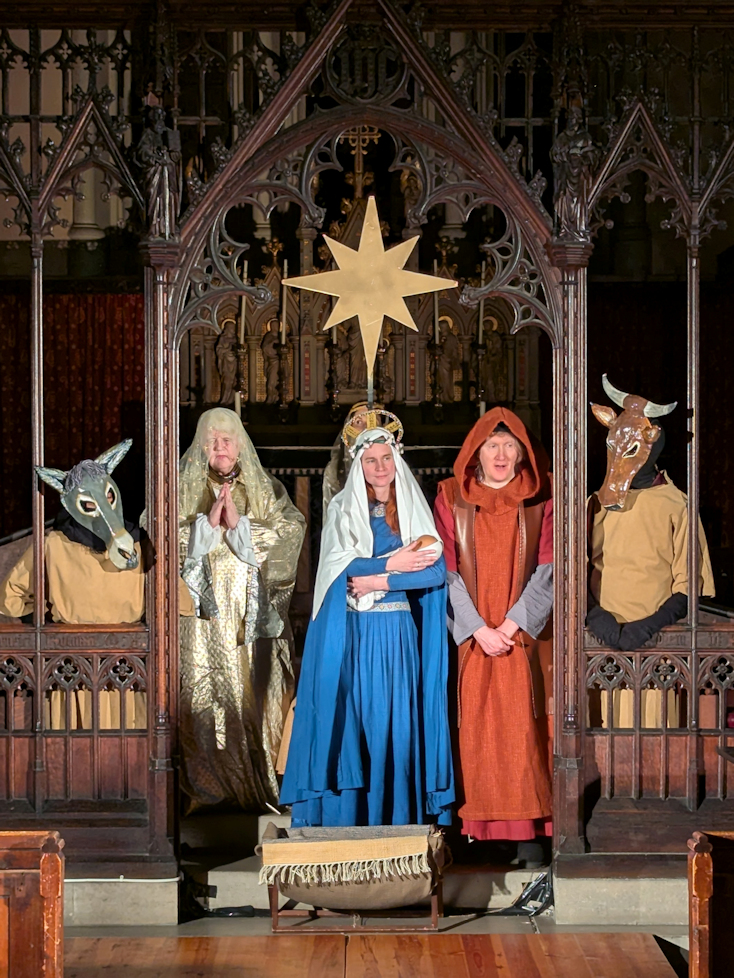
Nativity scene from the December 2025 production of the N-Town Cycle performed by the Players of St Peter who have been performing Medieval Mystery Plays in London since 1952

There are four complete or nearly complete extant English biblical collections of plays. A collection is the York cycle of forty-eight pageants; there are also the Towneley plays of thirty-two pageants; the Ludus Coventriae; and the Chester cycle of twenty-four pageants, now generally agreed to be an Elizabethan reconstruction of older medieval traditions. Also extant are two pageants from a New Testament cycle acted at Coventry. Additionally, a fifteenth-century play of the life of Mary Magdalene, The Brome Abraham and Isaac and a sixteenth-century play of the Conversion of Saint Paul exist. Besides the Middle English drama, there are a few surviving plays in Cornish: namely, the Ordinalia (which is a cycle of three plays) and Pascon Agan Aruth which both tell biblical stories, and Bewnans Ke and Bewnans Meriasek, which tell the stories of the lives of saints.

These biblical plays differ widely in content. Most contain episodes such as the Fall of Lucifer, the Creation and Fall of Man, Cain and Abel, Noah and the Flood, Abraham and Isaac, the Nativity, the Raising of Lazarus, the Passion, and the Resurrection. Other pageants included the story of Moses, the Procession of the Prophets, Christ's Baptism, the Temptation in the Wilderness, and the Assumption and Coronation of the Virgin. In given cycles, the plays came to be sponsored by the newly emerging Medieval craft guilds. The York mercers, for example, sponsored the Doomsday pageant. Other guilds presented scenes appropriate to their trade: the building of the Ark from the carpenters' guild; the five loaves and fishes miracle from the bakers; and the visit of the Magi, with their offerings of gold, frankincense and myrrh, from the goldsmiths. The guild associations are not, however, to be understood as the method of production for all towns. While the Chester pageants are associated with guilds, there is no indication that the N-Town plays are either associated with guilds or performed on pageant wagons. Perhaps the most famous of the mystery plays, at least to modern readers and audiences, are those of Wakefield. Unfortunately, we cannot know whether the plays of the Towneley manuscript are actually the plays performed at Wakefield but a reference in the Second Shepherds' Play to Horbery Shrogys is strongly suggestive. In "The London Burial Grounds" by Mrs Basil Holmes (1897), the author claims that the Holy Priory Church, next to St Katherine Cree on Leadenhall Street, London was the location of miracle plays from the tenth to the sixteenth century. Edmund Bonner, Bishop of London (c 1500 - 1569) stopped this in 1542.

Morality plays were popular at the same time. The decline of mystery plays was followed by the period of English Renaissance theatre. Some elements of mystery plays are retained in pantomimes.

== Spanish mystery plays ==
The oldest liturgical drama in Spain is from the 12th century and kept today in Toledo Cathedral. It is a play about the Biblical Magi, three wise men from the East who followed a star and visited the baby Jesus in Bethlehem. It is believed to have been based on an earlier play written in France.

The Misteri d'Elx (in English, the Elx Mystery Play or Mystery Play of Elx) is a liturgical drama dating from the 13th century which has been enacted and celebrated every year without any known interruptions. Commemorating the Assumption of Mary, it is played on every 14 and 15 August in the Basilica de Santa María in the city of Elx (also known as Elche). The prohibition of theatrical plays in churches by the Council of Trent eventually threatened to interrupt the yearly performance of the Misteri, but in 1632 Pope Urban VIII issued a special permit for its continuation. In 2001, UNESCO declared it one of the Masterpieces of the Oral and Intangible Heritage of Humanity.

== Miracle play ==
Miracle plays, or Saint's plays, are now distinguished from mystery plays as they specifically re-enacted miraculous interventions by the saints, particularly Saint Nicholas or St. Mary, rather than biblical events. Robert Chambers, writing in the 19th century, notes that "especially in England, miracle [came] to stand for religious play in general".

Cornish language miracle plays, particularly the Ordinalia trilogy, the Beunans Meriasek, and the Bewnans Ke, were traditionally performed at the plain-an-gwarrys. To capture the attention of the audience, "the plays were often noisy, bawdy and entertaining."

== Modern performances ==
Attention to the Medieval Mystery plays began to grow during the early 1800s, after their reference and publication by William Hone and James Heywood Markland. Notably, poet Lord Byron wrote the plays Cain and Heaven and Earth: A Mystery as modern version of medieval dramas on similar subjects. Mystery plays are produced regularly throughout the United Kingdom. The local cycles were revived in both York and Chester in 1951 as part of the Festival of Britain, and are still performed by the local guilds. The N-Town cycle was revived in 1978 as the Lincoln mystery plays, and in 1994 the Lichfield Mysteries were revived.

In 1977 the National Theatre commissioned Tony Harrison to create The Mysteries, a re-working of the Wakefield Cycle and others. It was again revived in 1985 (the production was filmed for Channel 4 Television), and as a part of the theatre's millennium celebration in 2000. The productions won Bill Bryden the Best Director title in both the 1985 Evening Standard Theatre Awards and the 1985 Laurence Olivier Awards, the year the three plays first appeared together in performance at the Lyceum Theatre.

In 2001, the Isango Ensemble produced an African version of the Chester Cycle at the Garrick Theatre in London as The Mysteries – Yiimimangaliso, performing in a combination of the Xhosa language, Zulu, English, Latin, and Afrikaans. They revived an adapted version of the production at Shakespeare's Globe in 2015 as The Mysteries. In 2004, two mystery plays (one focusing on the Creation and the other on the Passion) were performed at Canterbury Cathedral, with actor Edward Woodward in the role of God. The large cast also included Daniel MacPherson, Thomas James Longley and Joseph McManners.

Since 2019, members of the University of Oxford have staged several cycles of Medieval Mystery Plays in different languages at St Edmund Hall.

== See also ==
- Biblical Magi
- Pedro Calderón de la Barca
- Chester Mystery Plays
- Easter Drama
- El Gran Teatro del Mundo
- Lincoln Mystery Plays
- Liturgical drama
- Medieval theatre
- Mystery-Bouffe
- Mistero Buffo
- Morality play - evolved from mystery plays
- Nativity play
- Passion play
- The Subject of Tragedy by Catherine Belsey
- Wakefield Mystery Plays - a collection of thirty-two mystery plays performed in medieval and early Renaissance England.
- York Mystery Plays - a collection of forty-eight mystery plays
