= Tewdwr Mawr =

Breton and Cornish king

Tewdwr Mawr (Breton for "Theodore the Great"; Cornish: Teudar Maur or Teudaric; Welsh: Tewdr; Latin: Theodorus; French: Thierry; mid-6th century) was an early medieval king in Armorica (now Cornouaille, France) and Cornwall.

== Life ==
Tewdwr was a member of the royal family of Cornouaille in Armorica. His father was Hoel, who figured in Welsh mythology about the Matter of Britain and Tristan and Iseult. Other sources give different fathers, Cadell Mawr of Seisyllwg and Cadell ap Edwin of Gwynedd. While Tewdwr was still young, his grandfather Budic II was overthrown and forced into exile at the court of Aergol Lawhir of Dyfed. Budic successfully restored himself in the 540s but Hoel seems to have predeceased him. The king attempted to protect his succession by negotiating with a neighbouring ruler, Macliau of the Veneti, so that whichever lived longer would protect the young heir of the other. Upon Budic's death, however, Macliau invaded and annexed Cornouaille (r. c. 544–577).

Tewdwr fled to Cornwall and ruled over Penwith from Carnsew near the mouth of the Hayle River. He became infamous for his hostile reaction to Irish missionaries. He opposed Breage's mission (although Sabine Baring-Gould placed its arrival around 500), first compelling them to land at Reyvier instead of Carnsew and then later martyring several of its members, including Ia of Cornwall; Saint Gwinear met with a similar fate, being thrown with his followers into a pit of reptiles.

After decades of exile, Tewdwr returned to Brittany and defeated Macliau and his oldest son Jacob in 577. He permitted Macliau's younger son Waroc to rule around Vannes.

== Legacy ==
Having made martyrs of the Irish missionaries he opposed, Tewdwr became so infamous for his oppression that he began to appear in the hagiographies of saints he could not possibly have known, such as the 4th-century Meriasek. The early 6th-century Saint Kea supposedly protected a deer Tewdwr was hunting; losing his oxen in retaliation, the saint simply yoked the wild animal to plow his fields. Koch suggests that Tewdwr's appearances in Cornish literature—particularly the Tudor dramas Beunans Meriasek and Bewnans Ke—were satirical treatments of Henry VII of England following his suppression of the Cornish rebellion of 1497.
