= William Jordan (writer) =

Cornish dramatist

William Jordan (fl. 1611), Cornish dramatist, lived at Helston in Cornwall, and is supposed to have been the author of the Cornish language mystery or sacred drama Gwreans an Bys: the Creacon of the World. The oldest manuscript is in small folio in the Bodleian Library (N. 219); with it is a later copy; another is in the British Museum (Harl. 1867), together with a translation made by John Keigwin; and a fourth was in 1858 in the possession of John Camden Hotten; a fifth copy, perhaps the same as the fourth, was in 1890 in the possession of John Crichton-Stuart, 3rd Marquess of Bute and a sixth belonged to William Copeland Borlase.

The Creation of the World was inaccurately edited with Keigwin's translation by Davies Gilbert in 1827. In 1863, Mr. Whitley Stokes published in the Transactions of the Philological Society an edition consisting of a new transcript of Bodleian MS. N. 219, with an original translation and notes. Jordan's name appears at the end of the Bodleian manuscript. The drama is to some extent indebted to the Middle-Cornish drama called Origo Mundi, but many parts are original. A Breton play on the same subject was published in 1888 in the Revue Celtique, ix. 149, 322, x. 192, 414, xi. 254.
