= Ia of Cornwall =

Cornish evangelist, saint, and martyr

Saint Ia
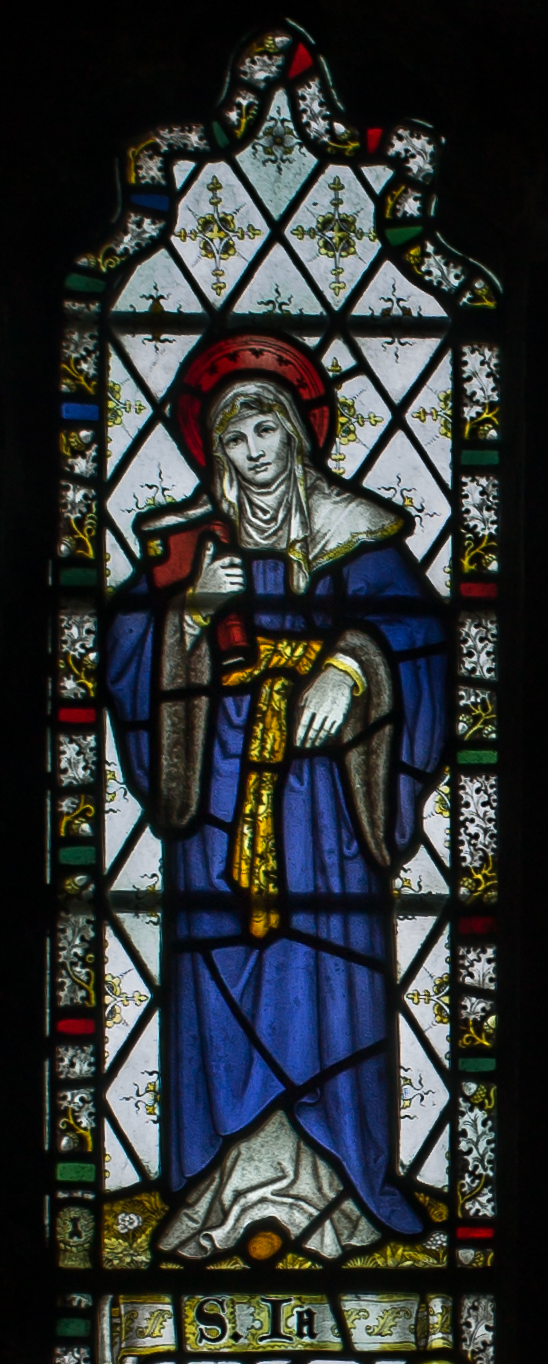
- 1914 stained glass window depicting Ia of Cornwall in St Olaf's Church, Poughill

Martyr
- Born: Ireland
- Died: 5th century River Hayle, Cornwall
- Venerated in: Catholic Church; Church of England; Eastern Orthodox Church
- Feast: 3 February
- Patronage: St Ives, Cornwall

Ia of Cornwall (also known as Eia, Hia, Ive or Hya) was an evangelist and martyr of the 5th or 6th centuries, flourishing in the area of St Ives, Cornwall. She is said to have been an Irish princess, the sister of Erc of Slane.

== Legend ==
Ia went to the seashore to depart for Cornwall from her native Ireland along with other saints. Finding that they had gone without her, fearing that she was too young for such a hazardous journey, she was grief-stricken and began to pray. As she prayed, she noticed a small leaf floating on the water and touched it with a rod to see if it would sink. As she watched, it grew bigger and bigger. Trusting God, she embarked upon the leaf and was carried across the Irish Sea. She reached Cornwall before the others, where she joined Gwinear and Felec of Cornwall.

John Leland gives details from a Latin hagiography of Ia, which is no longer extant. Legend holds that they had up to 777 companions. She is said to have founded an oratory in a clearing in a wood on the site of the existing Parish Church that is dedicated to her. Ia was martyred under "King Teudar" (i.e., Tewdwr Mawr of Penwith) on the River Hayle, and St Ia's Church was erected over her grave. Through local veneration of Ia, she gave her name to the town of St Ives, which grew up around the church.

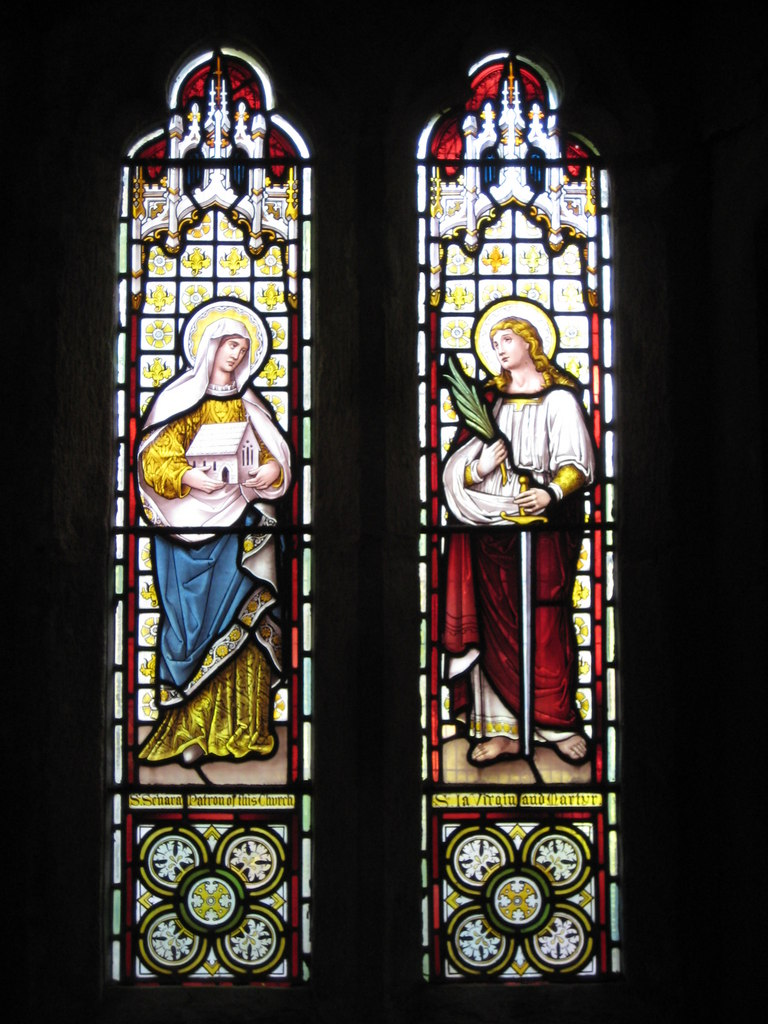
Window in St Senara's Church, Zennor - Saint Ia is depicted on the right

== Veneration ==
Like many Cornish saints, public and liturgical veneration of Ia is mostly limited to the area surrounding her patronal town. Ia has two churches dedicated to her, both in St Ives: St Ia's Church, which is of the Church of England, and a Catholic church dedicated to the Sacred Heart and Saint Ia. A now ruined chapel near Troon was also dedicated to her, initially built around the 10th century near a holy well. The church of Plouyé in Brittany was probably dedicated originally to this saint as well. St Olaf's Church, Poughill, St Senara's Church, Zennor, and St Uny's Church, Lelant have stained glass windows depicting her. Her feast day is 3 February.

== See also ==
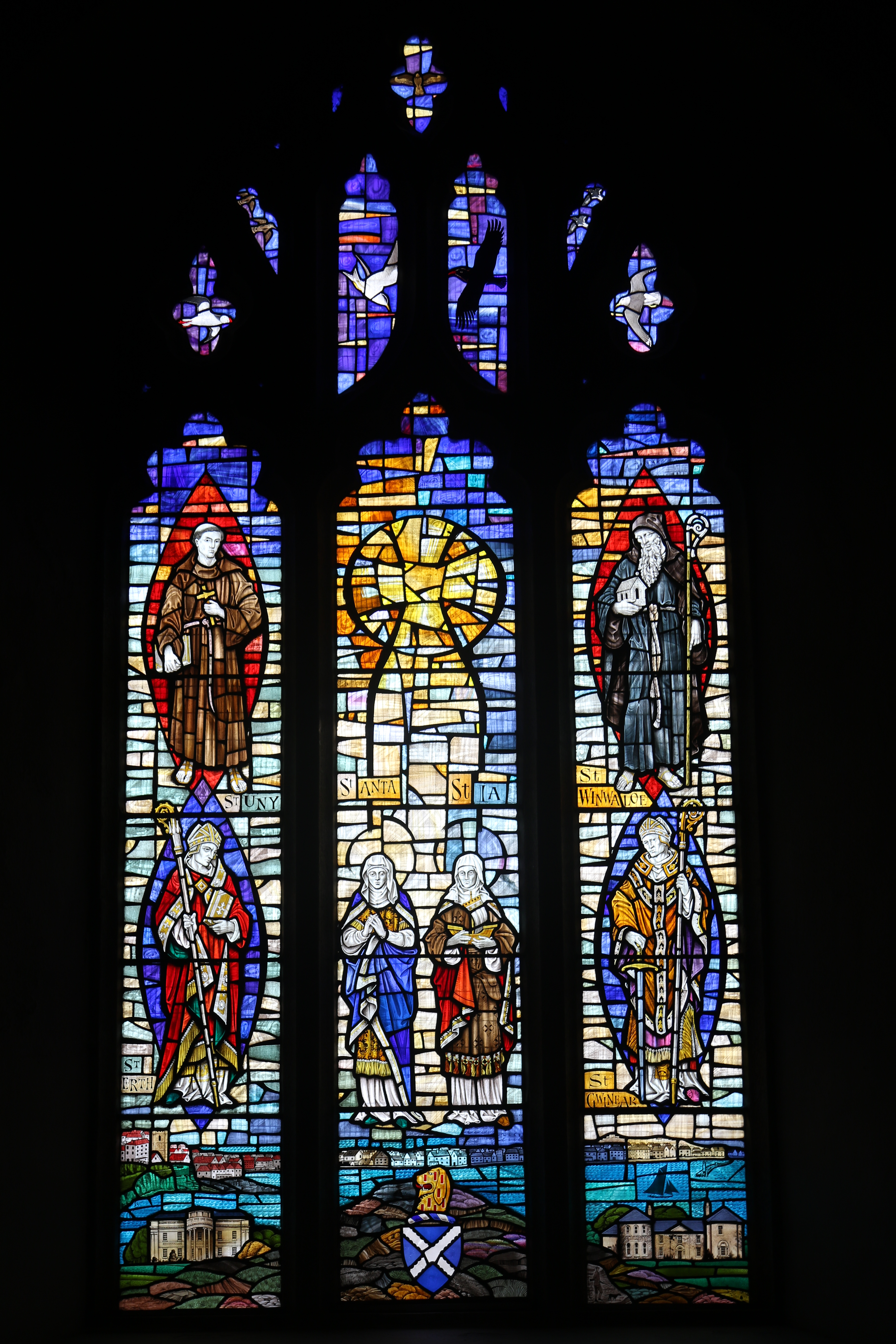
Window in St Uny's Church, Lelant. Saint Ia is depicted on the bottom row, second from the right.

- List of Cornish saints
- Christianity in Cornwall
