= Meriasek =

4th-century Breton saint

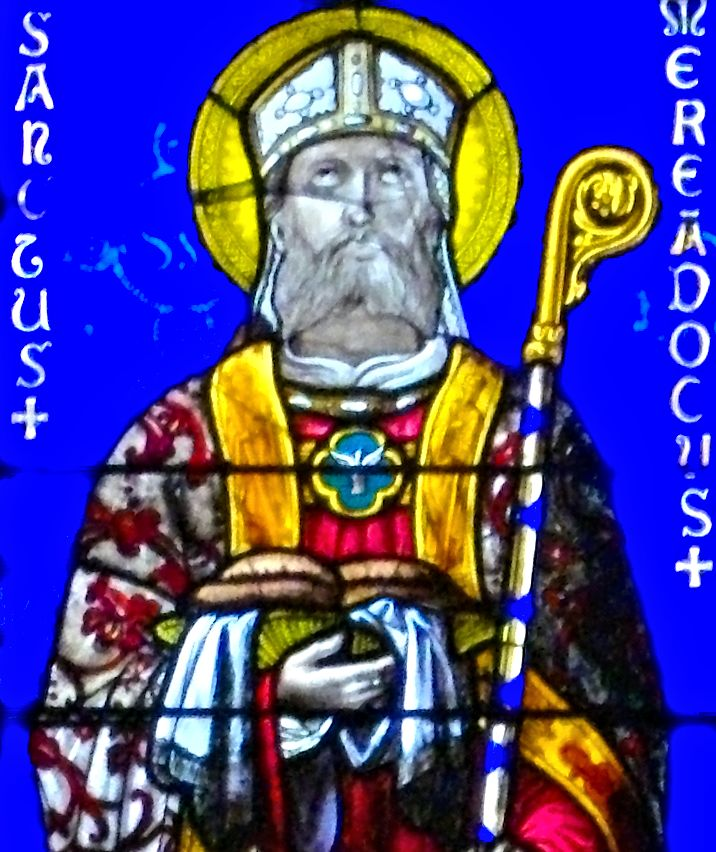

Saint Meriasek (Breton: Meriadeg) was a 6th-century Cornish and Breton saint. The legends of his life are known through Beunans Meriasek, a Cornish language play known from a single surviving manuscript copy dated 1504, and a few other sources. He is the patron saint of Camborne, and according to his legendary will his feast day is the first Friday in June (although it is celebrated in some places on 7 June).

== Sources ==
Until Beunans Ke came to light in 2000, Beunans Meriasek was the only known saint's play in Middle Cornish. It was rediscovered in the 1860s. It was most probably written down at Glasney collegiate church at Penryn by one Radulphus Ton, perhaps under the aegis of Master John Nans, provost of Glasney, who later moved to Camborne and died in 1508.

== Life ==
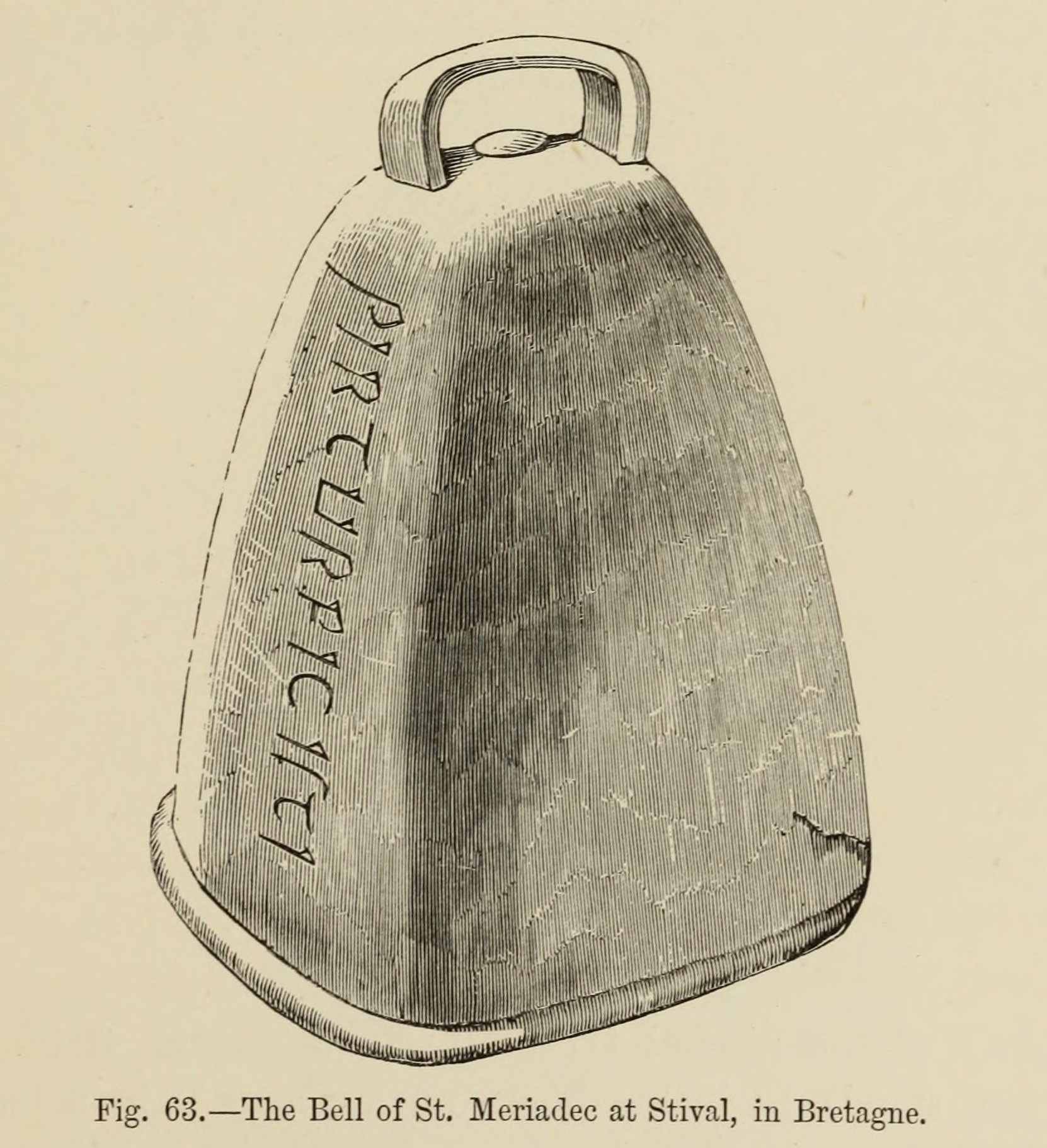
The Bell of St. Meriadec at Stival in Bretagne.

Meriasek was a Breton from a ducal family. Conan Meriadoc, the legendary king of Brittany at the time, wanted to arrange a political marriage for him, but Meriasek preferred to renounce his inheritance and become a priest. He performed several miraculous cures thereafter. He crossed the Channel to found an oratory in Camborne, Cornwall. Encountering persecution from King Teudar, he returned to Brittany (landing at Plougasnou) to found a chapel in Josselin, in the lands of the Viscounts of Rohan. His reputation for miracles attracted crowds and he decided to withdraw to Pontivy, close to the château of Rohan.

He assisted the Viscount in dealing with brigands who infested his lands by bringing down the fire of heaven upon them; in gratitude he founded three fairs at Noyal at the saint's request.

He is reputed to have healed many lepers and disabled people, to have driven off the highwaymen of Josselin through prayer, to have made water spring from solid rock, and to have calmed a storm. He was elevated to become bishop of Vannes but continued to wear a hair shirt, practise asceticism, and minister to the poor. He was buried in Vannes Cathedral. His sacred well in Camborne was long thought to have the power of healing the insane.

== Legacy ==
An open-air performance of an adaptation of "Beurens Mariasek" was performed in Heartlands by well over 100 schoolchildren on 13 July 2012. The performance was the culmination of a project that introduced students to the Cornish language and the tradition of medieval Cornish drama through a series of workshops and rehearsals.
