= Ordinalia =

Middle Cornish mystery plays

The Ordinalia (Cornish: Ordinali) are three medieval mystery plays dating to the late fourteenth century, written primarily in Middle Cornish, with stage directions in Latin. The three plays are Origo Mundi (The Origin of the World, also known as Ordinale de Origine Mundi, 2,846 lines), Passio Christi (The Passion of Christ, also known as Passio Domini Nostri Jhesu Christi, 3,242 lines) and Resurrexio Domini (The Resurrection of Our Lord also known as Ordinale de Ressurexione Domini, 2,646 lines). The metres of these plays are various arrangements of seven- and four-syllabled lines. Ordinalia means "prompt" or "service book".

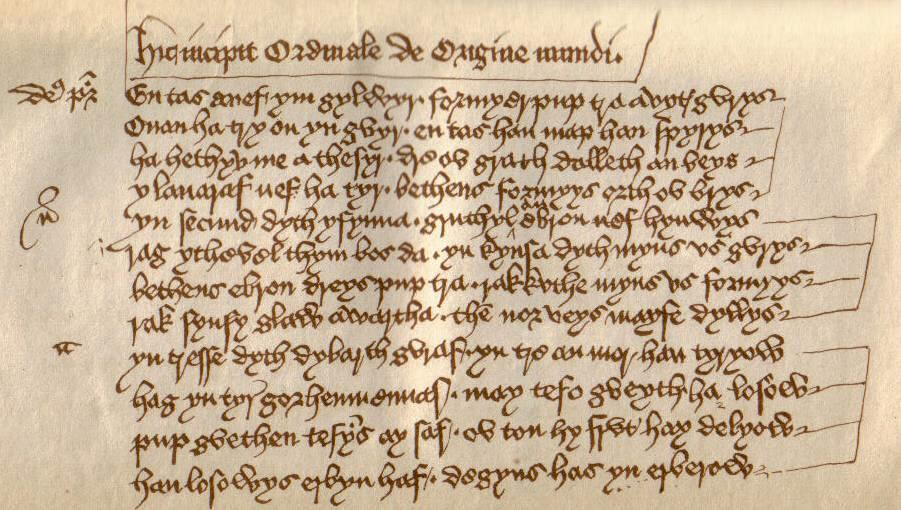
The opening verses of Origo Mundi, the first play of the Ordinalia

== First play ==
The first play, called Origo Mundi, begins with the Creation of the World, the Fall of Man, and Cain and Abel, followed by the building of the Ark and the Flood; the story of the temptation of Abraham closes the first act. The second act gives us the history of Moses, and the third represents the story of David and of the building of Solomon's Temple, curiously ending with a description of the death of Maximilla as a Christian by the bishop placed in charge of the temple by Solomon.

An offshoot of the Origo Mundi is the Creation of the World with Noah's Flood (Gwreans an Bys: the Creacon of the World), written in Cornish with English stage directions, copied by William Jordan in 1611.

== Second and third plays ==
The second play, Passio Christi, represents the Temptation of Christ in the desert, and the events from the entry into Jerusalem to the Crucifixion, including the Passion. This goes on without interruption into the third play, Resurrectio Domini, which gives an account of the Harrowing of Hell, the Resurrection, and the Ascension, with the Legend of St Veronica and Tiberius, the death of Pilate, the release of Joseph of Arimathea and Nicodemus from prison, The Three Marys. As in the Poem of the Passion, the pseudo-Gospel of Nicodemus and other legendary sources are drawn upon.

== Relationship to the Legend of the Cross ==
However, running through the whole and interwoven with the scriptural narrative comes the beautiful and curious Legend of the Rood (Legend of the Holy Cross). The legend, most of which is in the Ordinalia, is this:

When Adam found himself dying, he sent his son Seth to the Gates of Paradise to beg of the angel that guarded them the oil of mercy, that his father might live. The angel let him look into Paradise, where he saw many strange and beautiful foreshadowings of things that should be upon the earth; and the angel gave him three seeds from the Tree of Life, and he departed. When he came to where his father was, he found that he was already dead, and he laid the three seeds in his mouth, and buried him therewith on Mount Moriah; and in process of time the three seeds grew into three small trees, and Abraham took of the wood thereof for the sacrifice of Isaac his son; and afterwards Moses’ rod, wherewith he smote the rock, was made from one of their branches. And soon the three trees grew together into one tree, whereby was symbolised the mystery of the Trinity; and under its branches sat King David when Nathan the Prophet came to him, and there he bewailed his sin, and made the Miserere Psalm. And Solomon, when he would build the Temple on Mount Sion, cut down the tree, which was then as one of the chiefest of the cedars of Lebanon, and bid men make a beam thereof; but it would in no wise fit into its place, howsoever much they cut it to its shape. Therefore, Solomon was wroth, and bid them cast it over the brook Cedron as a bridge, so that all might tread upon it that went that way. But after a while he buried it, and over where it lay there came the Pool of Bethesda with its healing powers; and when our Lord came on earth the beam floated up to the surface of the pool, and the Jews found it, and made thereof the Cross whereon Christ died on Calvary.

== Extant manuscripts ==
There are three manuscripts of this trilogy in existence:

- Bodley 791, Oxford manuscript of the fifteenth century, given to the Bodleian Library by James Button on 28 March 1614. This manuscript is the original from which the others were copied, and from which Dr Edwin Norris edited the plays in 1859.
- Bodleian MSS 28556-28557, another Oxford manuscript, presented to the Bodleian Library by Edwin Ley of Bosahan about 1859, with a translation by John Keigwin. The copy of the text is older by a century than the translation.
- Peniarth MS 428E, a copy which was in the library of Sir John Williams, Bart., of Llansteffan, Carmarthenshire, with an autograph translation by Keigwin. On the death of Sir John it went to the National Library of Wales as part of his bequests.

== See also ==
- Beunans Meriasek, another play in the Cornish language
- Bewnans Ke, another play in Cornish (both plays are dramatisations of legends of Cornish saints, i.e. St Meriadoc and St Kea)
- Plen-an-gwary, the common place for an Ordinalia performance
