= Beunans Meriasek =

1504 Cornish play

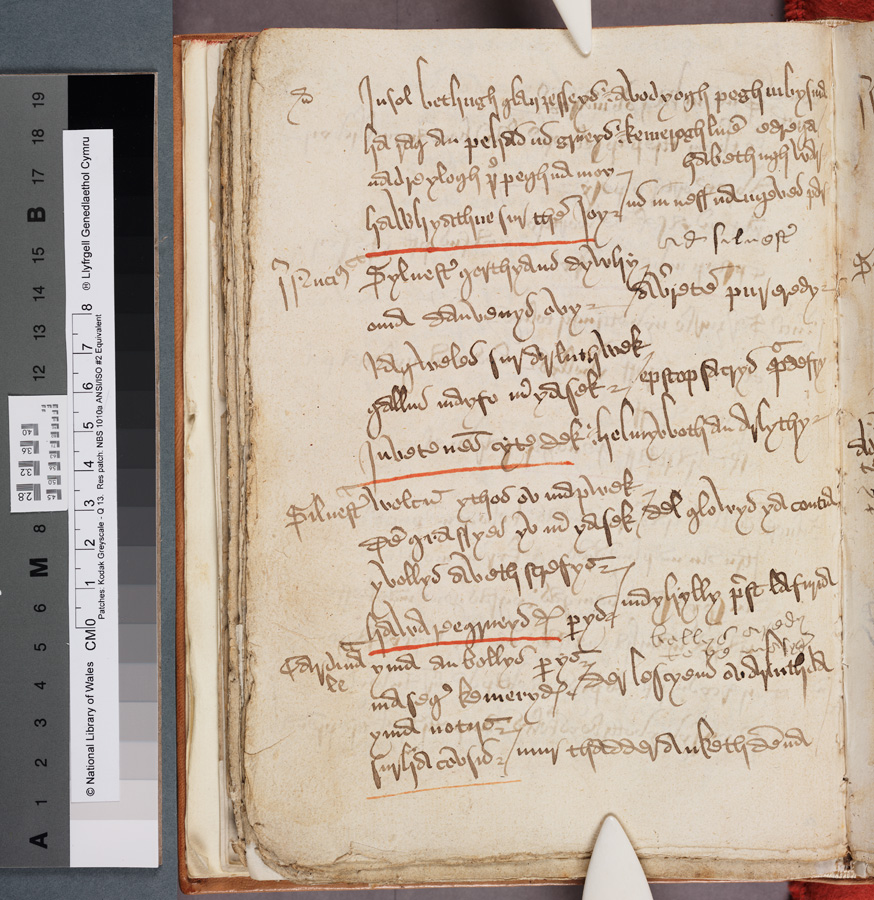
Beunans Meriasek (f. 56 v.)

Bewnans Meriasek (English: The Life of Saint Meriasek) is a Cornish play completed in 1504. Its subject is the legends of the life of Saint Meriasek or Meriadoc, patron saint of Camborne, whose veneration was popular in Cornwall, Brittany, and elsewhere. It was written in the Cornish language, probably written around the same time and in the same place as Bewnans Ke, the only other extant Cornish play taking a saint's life as its subject.

The manuscript of Beunans Meriasek was completed in 1504 by Dominus Radulphus Ton (known from a note in the colophon), who was probably a canon of Glasney College. It is now held in the Peniarth Collection at the National Library of Wales.

== Outline ==
The legend of Meriasek, son of a Duke of Brittany, who, for love of the priestly profession, refused marriage with a wealthy princess and led the life of a miracle-working hermit, first in Cornwall and afterwards in his native land; the legend of Saint Sylvester, who healed the emperor Constantine the Great of leprosy by a dip in the baptismal font, and then aided him in establishing Christianity throughout his broad dominion; and the curious legend of a mother who, on the Virgin's continued disregard of her prayer for the deliverance of a son in captivity, carried off the Christ Child from the arms of the Virgin's statue, and refused to yield up the baby to the Madonna until her own son was restored to her.

== See also ==
- Ordinalia
