= Bewnans Ke =

Middle Cornish play

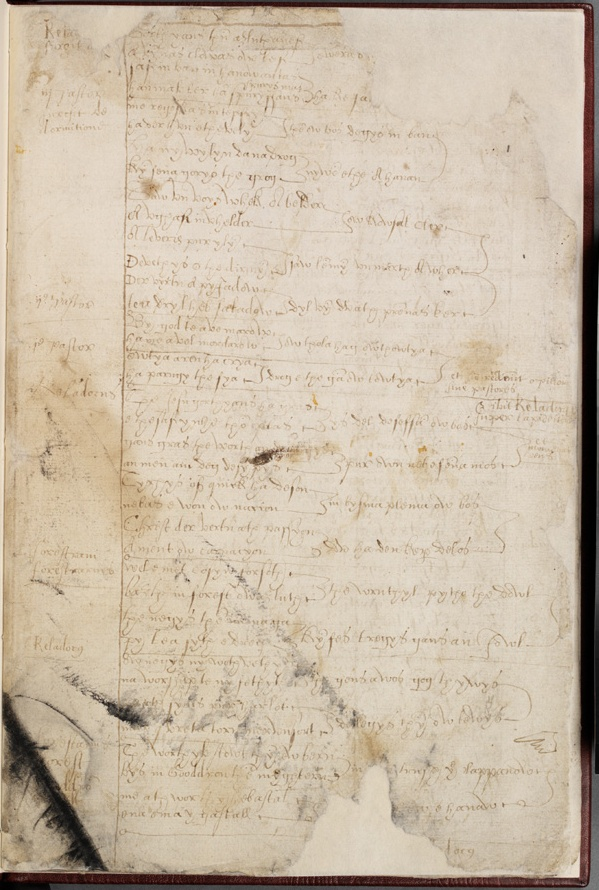
Opening page of Bewnans Ke (National Library of Wales, MS 23849D, folio 1r)

Bewnans Ke (The Life of Saint Ke) is a Middle Cornish play on the life of Saint Kea or Ke, who was venerated in Cornwall, Brittany and elsewhere. It was written around 1500 but survives only in an incomplete manuscript from the second half of the 16th century. The play was entirely unknown until 2000, when it was identified among the private collection of J. E. Caerwyn Williams, which had been donated to the National Library of Wales after his death the previous year. The discovery proved one of the most significant finds in the study of Cornish literature and language.

Bewnans Ke is one of only two known Cornish plays based on a saint's life; this and other evidence suggests some relationship with the other such work, Beunans Meriasek. The story has much correspondence with a French text, a translation of a lost medieval Latin hagiography of Kea, allowing gaps in the narrative to be tentatively filled. The play is divided into two distinct sections, which may indicate that it was intended for a two-day performance. The first section deals with the deeds and miracles of Kea, including his conflicts with the tyrannical king Teudar. The second is a long Arthurian episode, describing King Arthur's wars with the Romans and with his nephew Mordred; it does not mention Kea in its current form.

== History ==
Bewnans Ke survives in one manuscript, NLW MS 23849D, now held at the National Library of Wales. The play has no title in the text; the National Library gave it its modern name after consulting scholars of Cornish. The manuscript had been in the personal collection of J. E. Caerwyn Williams, chair of Irish at the University of Wales, Aberystwyth. After Williams' death in 1999, his widow Gwen Williams donated his papers to the National Library in 2000, and the previously unknown play was identified by Graham Thomas during the cataloguing process. Thomas publicized his discovery in the National Library of Wales Journal in 2002, and the manuscript was subsequently repaired and studied.

The manuscript was evidently created in the second half of the 16th century by a scribe copying a document dating perhaps to around 1500. Several leaves are missing, including the entire beginning and ending and, in two places, the copyist complains about the poor quality of the original. The provenance is entirely unknown, but the language is Middle Cornish, akin to that of Beunans Meriasek, the only other surviving Cornish play concerning a saint's life. This and other similarities between the plays suggest that both were composed around the same time and in the same milieu, most probably at Glasney College in Penryn. If this is correct, Bewnans Ke may have been performed in the still-extant "Playing Place" in the nearby village of that name, where Beunans Meriasek is known to have been performed.

The play clearly relies on traditional material about Kea, which is known to have been circulated in a Latin hagiography written as early as the 12th century. This work is lost, but a French translation published in Albert le Grand's Lives of the Saints of Brittany in 1633 survives. This French Life of Kea has much correspondence with the Cornish text, and has been used to fill in gaps in the action. Bewnans Ke was initially thought to represent two plays, as in its incomplete state it appears to consist of two distinct sections: one on the deeds of Kea and the other on the doings of King Arthur, in which Kea is not mentioned. However, comparison with the Life shows that Arthurian material had been added to the saint's story at an early period. This occurs in places that would be missing in the play, leading some scholars to regard it as a single work.

== Synopsis ==
The play consists of two long parts, one concerning the deeds and miracles of Saint Kea, and the other concerning King Arthur's conflicts with the Romans and with his nephew Mordred. The Arthurian section is longer, and is largely adapted from some version of the account in Geoffrey of Monmouth's Historia Regum Britanniae.

The lost beginning of the play probably recounted the events of Kea's early life, such as his birth to a noble family, his election as bishop, and his subsequent abdication in favour of life as a hermit. The extant text begins with Kea's resurrection of a deceased shepherd and his departure for Cornwall by either boat or flying flagstone. In Cornwall, he soon comes into conflict with the king, Teudar (the Breton Tewdwr Mawr of Penwith and Cornouaille), but is eventually given land near the king's favourite hunting grounds in Kea parish. The next section is missing, but context suggests the narrative would have followed the French Life, which has Kea giving refuge to a stag being hunted by Teudar. In retaliation Teudar's men take Kea's oxen and then break three of the saint's teeth. The manuscript picks back up as Kea generates a holy well and cures a leper who gives him additional land. Stags come from the woods to plough Kea's fields in place of the oxen. Teudar tries to make recompense for the injury he has caused Kea, and offers him any land he can empark before Teudar gets out of a bath. With Owbra's aid Kea makes a concoction that causes Teudar to get stuck in the bath, allowing him to take much of Teudar's land. The rest of the first section is missing, but probably dealt with Kea's return to Cléder in Brittany.

The second section begins as King Arthur receives a long list of nobles at his court, including names familiar from Geoffrey of Monmouth such as Duke Cador, Augelus of Scotland, Bedivere, a different Ke (Sir Kay), Mordred, and Gawain. The scene jumps to Rome, where Emperor Lucius has heard that Arthur refuses to recognize him. He sends twelve emissaries to exact tribute from Arthur. A gap occurs just after the emissaries arrive in Britain and greet the king. In the next extant section, Arthur refuses to pay tribute and sends the legates back to Lucius empty-handed. Lucius confers with his advisors, and decides to raise his forces against Arthur. Leaving his nephew Mordred in charge, Arthur says his goodbyes to Guinevere and then departs for France to meet Lucius. The two armies battle, and Arthur defeats and kills Lucius, and sends his severed head back to Rome. Meanwhile, Mordred and Guinevere conspire to usurp the throne, and Mordred is crowned king in Arthur's place. Arthur hears of this treachery and assembles his counsellors, while Mordred allies with the Saxon Cheldric. Arthur returns to Britain, and the two armies clash. The text breaks off during a scene with Guinevere in the castle; the end is missing. If it followed the Life, Kea would have re-entered the picture. In the Life, Kea is summoned to mediate between Arthur and Mordred, but he comes to realize that the endeavour is futile. He heads back to Brittany, stopping in Winchester where he castigates Guinevere. The remorseful queen enters a convent. Kea returns to Cléder, where he eventually dies peacefully.

== Analysis and significance ==
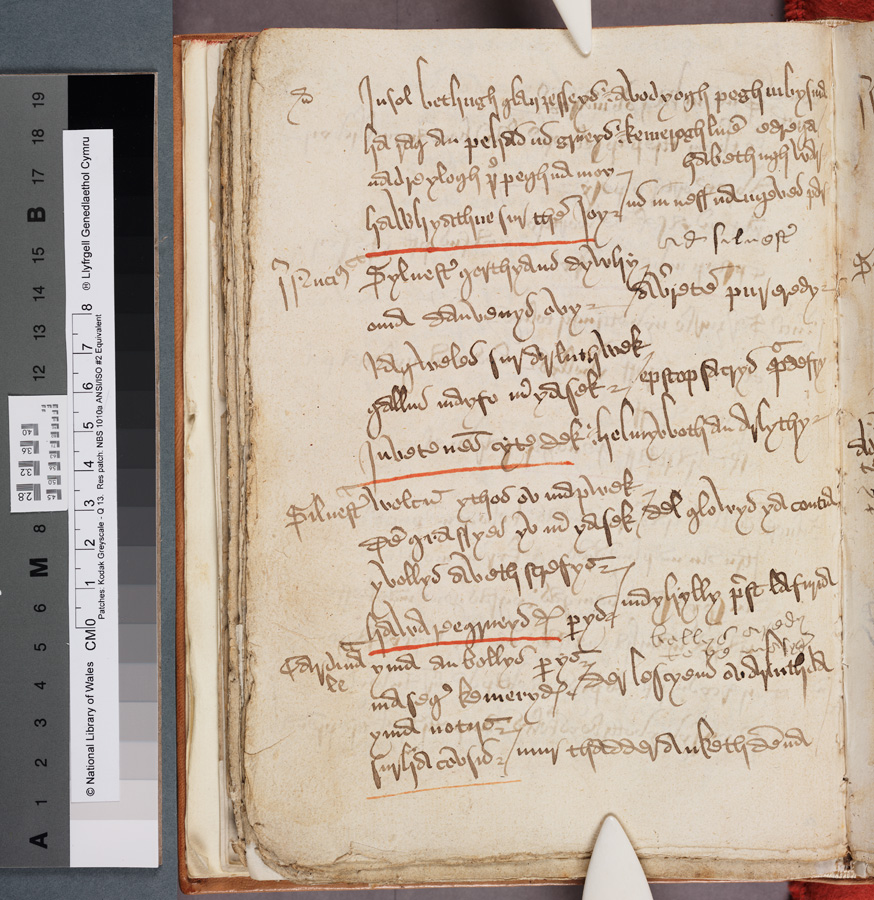
A page from Beunans Meriasek (National Library of Wales, MS Peniarth 105B, folio 56v)

Scholars have pointed out a number of similarities with Beunans Meriasek. The two are comparable in subject matter: they are the only known vernacular plays on saints' hagiographies to have been produced in Britain. The language in both works is similar and dates to the same era, leading to the conclusion that they originate around the same time and place. Both plays include the court at Goodern of the tyrannical king Teudar, who may be intended as a parody of King Henry VII after his crushing of the Cornish Rebellion of 1497. As such, it is thought that Bewnans Ke, like Beunans Meriasek, was written at Glasney College at the beginning of the 16th century. It is possible that the surviving manuscripts of the two plays were brought to Wales together.

The substantial length and distinct nature of the two sections may imply that the play was intended for performance over the course of two days, as was the case with Beunans Meriasek. Beunans Meriasek contains diagrams at the end of each section indicating the completion of a day's performance; these occur in places that would be missing in the Bewnans Ke manuscript. John T. Koch finds the first section to be more dramatic and effective, calling the second section "stolid", though he notes its importance to Arthurian studies. On top of Cornish, the text is peppered with lines and words in English, Latin, and Anglo-Norman French, particularly in the second section. The stage directions are mostly in Latin, but some are in Cornish and English, though the latter may have been added later.

The discovery of the play was the first addition to the corpus of historical Cornish literature since John Tregear's Homilies were found in 1949. It is also of vast importance to the study of the Cornish language, as it provides valuable evidence of the state of Cornish in the Tudor period, which was transitional between Middle and Late Cornish. Many words in the play are not attested in any other sources. The Cornish stage directions, though relatively few, contain some of the oldest known Cornish prose.

== Publication ==
A scholarly edition of the play was published in March 2007 by the University of Exeter Press in affiliation with the National Library of Wales; it was edited by Graham Thomas and Nicholas Williams. The National Library also created a digital copy of the manuscript which was released on the Library's web page in 2006. Prior to publication, study of the play was aided by a summary of the text by O. J. Padel, and a tentative translation by Michael Polkinhorn. These were released on the web and removed when the Thomas and Williams edition was published. Prior to this, in 2006 Kesva an Taves Kernewek (The Cornish Language Board) published an edition of the play edited by Ken George, entitled Bywnans Ke; this caused some friction with the National Library.
