= Grade II* listed buildings in Cornwall (A–G) =

Cornwall shown in England

There are over 20,000 Grade II* listed buildings in England. This article comprises a list of these buildings in the county of Cornwall.

== List of buildings ==
Name	Location	Type	Completed (Note: The date given is the date used by Historic England as significant for the initial building or that of an important part in the structure's description.)	Date designated	Grid ref. (Note: The grid reference is based on the British national grid reference system, sometimes known as OSGB36, used by the Ordnance Survey.) Geo-coordinates	Entry number (Note: The "List Entry Number" is a unique number assigned to each listed building and scheduled monument by Historic England.)	Image
Abbey House	Padstow	House	Late 15th century	24 April 1953	SW9194275499; 50°32′32″N 4°56′16″W	1289740	Abbey House More images
Acton Castle	Perranuthnoe	Country house	c.1775	9 October 1987	SW5515228445; 50°06′20″N 5°25′32″W	1160515	Acton Castle More images
Aldercombe Barton	Kilkhampton	Farmhouse	16th century	26 September 1951	SS2699411758; 50°52′46″N 4°27′38″W	1141822	Upload Photo
All Hallows Church of Saint Kea	Kea	Parish church	1894	30 May 1967	SW8100642653; 50°14′36″N 5°04′22″W	1310700	All Hallows Church of Saint Kea More images
Almshouses	Tregoney	Almshouses	1696	30 May 1985	SW9236044812; 50°16′00″N 4°54′54″W	1141037	Almshouses
Alverton Manor Hotel	Truro	House	Mid-19th century	10 December 1984	SW8316145141; 50°15′59″N 5°02′38″W	1282635	Alverton Manor Hotel More images
Anderton and barn adjoining at west	Launcells	Farmhouse	15th century	29 September 1961	SS2773105746; 50°49′32″N 4°26′50″W	1141830	Upload Photo
Antenna No. 1 (Arthur) at Goonhilly Satellite Earth Station	Goonhilly Downs, St. Martin-in-Meneage	Satellite dish	1960–62	26 March 2003	SW7272321303; 50°02′54″N 5°10′34″W	1350341	Antenna No. 1 (Arthur) at Goonhilly Satellite Earth Station More images
Arwenack House and Arwenack Manor	Falmouth	Apartment	Mostly rebuilt 1571	22 July 1949	SW8122832310; 50°09′01″N 5°03′49″W	1270061	Arwenack House and Arwenack Manor More images
Assay Office about 20m south-west of Count House at King Edward Mine	Camborne	Assay office	Late 19th century	12 September 1989	SW6631938902; 50°12′14″N 5°16′34″W	1142686	Upload Photo
Bank House	St. Columb Major	House	1857	21 January 1985	SW9136863635; 50°26′07″N 4°56′21″W	1144073	Upload Photo
Baptist Church and attached schoolroom at rear	Penzance	Schoolroom	Mid-19th century	29 July 1950	SW4710630350; 50°07′09″N 5°32′21″W	1143967	Baptist Church and attached schoolroom at rear More images
Bareppa House	Bareppa, Mawnan	House	c.Early 18th century	17 June 1988	SW7814729757; 50°07′35″N 5°06′19″W	1309989	Upload Photo
Barn 30m to north of Bokelly	St. Kew	Barn	Possibly 17th century	6 June 1969	SX0405077051; 50°33′37″N 4°46′05″W	1129856	Upload Photo
Barn about 25m south-west of Tredown Farmhouse	South Petherwin	Bank barn	Late 18th or early 19th century	25 February 1991	SX3026082592; 50°37′06″N 4°24′03″W	1142740	Upload Photo
Barn about 40m south-east of Tremaer	Bude-Stratton	Barn	c.14th-century origins	9 September 1985	SS2074107893; 50°50′34″N 4°32′51″W	1229361	Upload Photo
Barn and adjoining buildings	Mylor	Barn etc.	c.Late 18th century	30 May 1967	SW7881737991; 50°12′02″N 5°06′03″W	1160345	Upload Photo
Barn and two adjoining engine houses about 10m north of Trewithen Farmhouse	Probus	Horse engine house	c.1800	17 October 1984	SW9144947731; 50°17′33″N 4°55′45″W	1141079	Upload Photo
Barn about 20m south of Kestle Barton Farmhouse and Kestle Cottage	Manaccan	Barn	c.Late 18th century	22 June 1987	SW7535225448; 50°05′12″N 5°08′30″W	1328581	Barn about 20m south of Kestle Barton Farmhouse and Kestle Cottage
Barn with gate piers and adjoining building about 50m east of Golden Manor House	Probus	Barn	15th–16th century	10 May 1967	SW9208946895; 50°17′07″N 4°55′12″W	1310504	Barn with gate piers and adjoining building about 50m east of Golden Manor House
Barrack block, Maker Heights Barracks	Maker-with-Rame	Barracks	1804–08	8 July 1998	SX4349351396; 50°20′30″N 4°12′03″W	1375582	Barrack block, Maker Heights Barracks
Basil Manor	St. Clether	House	Early 16th century	23 November 1988	SX2045884070; 50°37′43″N 4°32′24″W	1159225	Basil Manor
Battens Mill	North Hill	Watermill	Probably late 16th century	10 May 1989	SX2720875941; 50°33′27″N 4°26′27″W	1249309	Upload Photo
Beehive Cottage	Veryan	House	c.1820	30 May 1967	SW9154639604; 50°13′11″N 4°55′24″W	1291428	Beehive Cottage More images
Berriowbridge Bridge	Berriowbridge, North Hill	Road bridge	Mid-16th century	22 November 1960	SX2731775668; 50°33′19″N 4°26′21″W	1249964	Berriowbridge Bridge More images
Bible Christian Chapel	St. Cleer	Chapel	1846	21 August 1964	SX2432468210; 50°29′14″N 4°28′40″W	1311103	Upload Photo
Bochym Manor House	Cury	Manor house	Late Medieval	10 July 1957	SW6907920798; 50°02′33″N 5°13′35″W	1141746	Bochym Manor House More images
Boconnoc House	Boconnoc Park, Boconnoc	Country house	16th/17th century	27 August 1952	SX1463260562; 50°24′56″N 4°36′38″W	1140354	Boconnoc House More images
Bodriggy House, including front garden walls	Hayle	House	c.1718	14 January 1988	SW5656037636; 50°11′19″N 5°24′42″W	1160426	Upload Photo
Boiler House immediately to north-east of pump engine house to Robinsons Shaft at South Crofty Mine	Carn Brea	Boiler house	1903	12 September 1989	SW6679741256; 50°13′31″N 5°16′15″W	1160761	Boiler House immediately to north-east of pump engine house to Robinsons Shaft at South Crofty Mine
Bonallack Barton Cottages	Bonallack Barton, Constantine	House	Probably 16th century	10 July 1957	SW7185626453; 50°05′39″N 5°11′28″W	1142154	Upload Photo
Bonython Manor House	Cury	House	c.1790	10 July 1957	SW6965421138; 50°02′44″N 5°13′07″W	1141754	Bonython Manor House More images
Boskenna	Boskenna, St. Buryan	Country house	17th century	15 December 1988	SW4228623671; 50°03′26″N 5°36′07″W	1137280	Upload Photo
Botallack Manor House	Botallack, St. Just	Manor house	17th century	26 April 1950	SW3672133041; 50°08′20″N 5°41′09″W	1143288	Botallack Manor House More images
Boundary wall to Lanherne Carmelite Convent	St Mawgan, Mawgan-in-Pydar	Boundary wall	Late 17th century	12 May 1988	SW8713665895; 50°27′15″N 5°00′00″W	1137593	Upload Photo
Braganza House	St Mawes, St. Just-in-Roseland	House	c.1830	30 May 1967	SW8474033178; 50°09′34″N 5°00′54″W	1136691	Upload Photo
Bridge about 150m east of Chyverton House	Chyverton, Perranzabuloe	Bridge	18th century	31 October 1988	SW7986651133; 50°19′08″N 5°05′37″W	1328680	Upload Photo
Buildings at Wheal St Vincent	Callington	Smelting works	Early to mid-19th century	22 September 1986	SX3850969647; 50°30′15″N 4°16′43″W	1140789	Buildings at Wheal St Vincent More images
Burdenwell Manor and cottage adjoining at north-east	Week St. Mary	Farmhouse	Probably 16th century	29 September 1961	SX2392997796; 50°45′11″N 4°29′51″W	1137650	Upload Photo
Burrell House	Longlands, Saltash	House	Early 17th century	17 January 1952	SX3960258417; 50°24′13″N 4°15′30″W	1140376	Upload Photo
Calciner with attached chimney to south of dressing plant at King Edward Mine	Camborne	Calciner	1904	12 September 1989	SW6639038878; 50°12′13″N 5°16′30″W	1159243	Calciner with attached chimney to south of dressing plant at King Edward Mine More images
Calenick House and garden walls to south and north	Calenick, Kea	House	1702	12 March 1986	SW8209343178; 50°14′54″N 5°03′28″W	1329027	Calenick House and garden walls to south and north More images
Calf house at Lithiack and stable adjacent to north	St. Germans	Calf house	Late 18th–early 19th century	9 October 1987	SX3588258420; 50°24′10″N 4°18′39″W	1140518	Upload Photo
Camelot Restaurant	Penzance	House	18th century	10 January 1969	SW4713730283; 50°07′07″N 5°32′19″W	1143144	Camelot Restaurant More images
Cannon in undergrowth beside the Green Walk of Prideaux Place	Prideaux Place, Padstow	Cannon	c.1700	20 May 1988	SW9129675562; 50°32′33″N 4°56′49″W	1289637	Upload Photo
Carharrack Methodist Church	Carharrack	Methodist chapel	1815	12 September 1989	SW7305241439; 50°13′45″N 5°11′00″W	1160248	Carharrack Methodist Church More images
Carines Farmhouse with attached garden wall	Cubert	Farmhouse	c.Early 17th century	30 May 1967	SW7904959027; 50°23′22″N 5°06′35″W	1141566	Upload Photo
Carnanton House	Mawgan-in-Pydar	House	c.1710	25 August 1987	SW8781864629; 50°26′35″N 4°59′23″W	1327395	Carnanton House More images
Carpenters shop, workshops and forge at Robinsons Shaft, South Crofty Mine	Carn Brea	Carpenters workshop	1903–10	27 October 1999	SW6674641230; 50°13′30″N 5°16′18″W	1379233	Carpenters shop, workshops and forge at Robinsons Shaft, South Crofty Mine More images
Cartuther Barton and courtyard buildings to north-east	Menheniot	House	Late 17th century	21 August 1964	SX2635663156; 50°26′33″N 4°26′49″W	1329407	Upload Photo
Castle Hill House	Launceston	Town house	Early/mid-18th century	27 February 1950	SX3308784731; 50°38′18″N 4°21′43″W	1297886	Upload Photo
Castle Horneck	Penzance	House	Late 18th/early 19th century	7 February 1974	SW4575330268; 50°07′05″N 5°33′29″W	1143172	Castle Horneck More images
Castle remains at harbour mouth	Fowey	Fortified house	Late 15th century	13 March 1951	SX1217751334; 50°19′55″N 4°38′26″W	1327315	Castle remains at harbour mouth
Celtic cross adjacent to the Town Hall	Penryn	Preaching cross	Possibly pre-Conquest	22 September 1971	SW7850834397; 50°10′05″N 5°06′11″W	1187644	Celtic cross adjacent to the Town Hall More images
Chantry	St. Ive	House	1852–54	26 November 1985	SX3101567125; 50°28′46″N 4°22′59″W	1137118	Upload Photo
Chapel immediately to east of Shillingham Farmhouse	Shillingham Manor, Saltash	Ruined chapel	14th century	17 January 1952	SX4073957245; 50°23′36″N 4°14′31″W	1329258	Upload Photo
Chapel Mill	St. Stephen-in-Brannel	China stone mill	Late 19th century	17 July 1995	SW9485253102; 50°20′31″N 4°53′04″W	1261837	Upload Photo
Chapel of St Clether	St. Clether	Well chapel	15th century	23 November 1988	SX2022584587; 50°37′59″N 4°32′36″W	1159239	Chapel of St Clether More images
Chapel of St George and St Thomas a Becket	Calstock	Chapel	c.1490	23 January 1968	SX4252468552; 50°29′44″N 4°13′18″W	1140219	Chapel of St George and St Thomas a Becket More images
Chapel of St Michael	Maker-with-Rame	Chapel	Medieval	23 January 1968	SX4181448328; 50°18′49″N 4°13′23″W	1159655	Chapel of St Michael More images
Chapel of St Nectan	St. Winnow	Chapel	c.15th century	21 August 1966	SX1283559983; 50°24′35″N 4°38′08″W	1138175	Chapel of St Nectan More images
Chapel at SX426527	Millbrook	Chapel	Late 13th century	23 January 1968	SX4264652738; 50°21′12″N 4°12′48″W	1329133	Upload Photo
Chimney stack about 30m east of pump engine house at Taylor's Shaft of New East Pool Mine	Carn Brea	Engine house	1922	9 April 1975	SW6744241895; 50°13′52″N 5°15′44″W	1328183	Chimney stack about 30m east of pump engine house at Taylor's Shaft of New East Pool Mine
Church House	Poughill, Bude-Stratton	Cross-passage house	Early 16th century or earlier	9 September 1985	SS2225707712; 50°50′30″N 4°31′33″W	1278759	Upload Photo
Church of All Saints	Falmouth	Anglican church	1887–90	23 January 1973	SW8030932441; 50°09′04″N 5°04′36″W	1270048	Church of All Saints More images
Church of King Charles the Martyr; the Church Institute	Falmouth	Church institute	1662–65	22 July 1949	SW8096532631; 50°09′11″N 5°04′03″W	1270080	Church of King Charles the Martyr; the Church Institute More images
Church of Saint Anthony	Gerrans	Parish church	13th century	30 May 1967	SW8548532035; 50°08′58″N 5°00′15″W	1141049	Church of Saint Anthony More images
Church of Saint Budock	Budock Water, Budock	Parish church	13th century	10 July 1957	SW7862232396; 50°09′01″N 5°06′01″W	1141977	Church of Saint Budock More images
Church of Saint Credan	Sancreed	Parish church	15th century	15 December 1988	SW4202529356; 50°06′29″N 5°36′34″W	1143822	Church of Saint Credan More images
Church of Saint Crewen	Crowan	Parish church	15th century	10 July 1957	SW6458334495; 50°09′49″N 5°17′52″W	1160230	Church of Saint Crewen More images
Church of Saint Feock	Feock	Parish church	1875–76	30 May 1967	SW8248338430; 50°12′21″N 5°02′59″W	1329009	Church of Saint Feock More images
Church of Saint Gothian	Gwithian Churchtown, Gwinear-Gwithian	Parish church	15th century	14 January 1988	SW5863541263; 50°13′19″N 5°23′06″W	1327619	Church of Saint Gothian More images
Church of Saint Laud	Spargo, Mabe	Parish church	15th century	10 July 1957	SW7574432479; 50°09′00″N 5°08′26″W	1328122	Church of Saint Laud More images
Church of Saint Mawnan	Mawnan	Parish church	13th century	10 July 1957	SW7877427234; 50°06′14″N 5°05′42″W	1161760	Church of Saint Mawnan More images
Church of Saint Paul	Ludgvan Churchtown, Ludgvan	Parish church	Norman	10 June 1954	SW5052333036; 50°08′41″N 5°29′35″W	1143598	Church of Saint Paul More images
Church of Saint Piran	Perranarworthal	Parish church	15th century	30 May 1967	SW7792638930; 50°12′31″N 5°06′49″W	1141586	Church of Saint Piran More images
Church of Saint Piran	Perranzabuloe	Parish church	1804	30 May 1967	SW7704752036; 50°19′34″N 5°08′01″W	1312468	Church of Saint Piran More images
Church of Saint Sennen	Sennen	Parish church	13th century	15 December 1988	SW3570925517; 50°04′15″N 5°41′42″W	1143798	Church of Saint Sennen More images
Church of Saint Stedian	Stithians	Parish church	15th century	10 July 1957	SW7311037131; 50°11′26″N 5°10′48″W	1162143	Church of Saint Stedian More images
Church of Saint Towennac	Towednack	Church	15th century	10 June 1954	SW4869738077; 50°11′21″N 5°31′19″W	1137373	Church of Saint Towennac More images
Church of St Agnes	Churchtown St Agnes, St. Agnes	Parish church	15th century	30 May 1967	SW7202850734; 50°18′45″N 5°12′12″W	1328673	Church of St Agnes More images
Church of St Allen (Alleyne)	St Allen	Parish church	12th century	30 May 1967	SW8223850602; 50°18′54″N 5°03′36″W	1141465	Church of St Allen (Alleyne) More images
Church of St Andrew	Tywardreath, Tywardreath and Par	Church	14th century	28 November 1950	SX0849054314; 50°21′27″N 4°41′37″W	1212463	Church of St Andrew More images
Church of St Bartholomew	Warleggan	Parish church	13th century	21 August 1964	SX1563869095; 50°29′33″N 4°36′02″W	1140464	Church of St Bartholomew More images
Church of St Blaize	St Blazey, St. Blaise	Church	c.1440	28 November 1950	SX0686354813; 50°21′41″N 4°43′00″W	1289700	Church of St Blaize More images
Church of St Briocus	Lezant	Church	Early 13th century	22 November 1960	SX3384779087; 50°35′16″N 4°20′55″W	1291277	Church of St Briocus More images
Church of St Catherine	Temple, Blisland	Church	c.Late 12th or early 13th century	6 June 1969	SX1461473240; 50°31′46″N 4°37′01″W	1311621	Church of St Catherine More images
Church of St Clement (Methodist)	Mousehole, Penzance	Methodist chapel	1784	14 October 1991	SW4686526179; 50°04′54″N 5°32′23″W	1115115	Church of St Clement (Methodist) More images
Church of St Clether	St. Clether	Parish church	15th century	23 November 1988	SX2054884382; 50°37′53″N 4°32′20″W	1328078	Church of St Clether More images
Church of St David	Davidstow	Parish church	Probably 15th century	17 December 1962	SX1511287264; 50°39′20″N 4°37′01″W	1158418	Church of St David More images
Church of St Denis	Otterham	Parish church	Norman origins	17 December 1962	SX1683490761; 50°41′15″N 4°35′40″W	1143456	Church of St Denis More images
Church of St Dennis	St Dennis	Church	Probably late 14th–early 15th century	10 February 1967	SW9507258306; 50°23′20″N 4°53′03″W	1327433	Church of St Dennis More images
Church of St Elwyn	Hayle	Parish church	1886–88	14 January 1988	SW5591137573; 50°11′16″N 5°25′15″W	1143688	Church of St Elwyn More images
Church of St Euny	Church Town, Redruth	Church	Late 15th century	1 December 1951	SW6912141232; 50°13′33″N 5°14′18″W	1161605	Church of St Euny More images
Church of St Gluvias	Penryn	Parish church	15th century	28 January 1949	SW7873834662; 50°10′14″N 5°06′00″W	1205597	Church of St Gluvias More images
Church of St Gomonda	Roche	Parish church	14th century	10 February 1967	SW9879659796; 50°24′13″N 4°49′58″W	1158829	Church of St Gomonda More images
Church of St Goran	Gorran Churchtown, St Goran	Church	12th century	10 February 1967	SW9995042303; 50°14′48″N 4°48′26″W	1144750	Church of St Goran More images
Church of St Gregory	Treneglos	Parish church	Norman origins	22 November 1960	SX2078688106; 50°39′54″N 4°32′14″W	1310214	Church of St Gregory More images
Church of St Gulval	Gulval, Penzance	Church	1440	29 July 1950	SW4846631754; 50°07′57″N 5°31′16″W	1327829	Church of St Gulval More images
Church of St Helena	Helland	Church	14th century	6 June 1969	SX0751471014; 50°30′26″N 4°42′57″W	1327931	Church of St Helena More images
Church of St Hermes	Churchtown, St. Erme	Anglican church	15th century	30 May 1967	SW8464649866; 50°18′34″N 5°01′33″W	1136778	Church of St Hermes More images
Church of St Hermes	St. Ervan	Parish church	13th century	6 June 1969	SW8917670283; 50°29′40″N 4°58′26″W	1212526	Church of St Hermes More images
Church of St John (Methodist)	St. Austell	Methodist church	1828	28 November 1950	SX0116452595; 50°20′23″N 4°47′44″W	1211944	Church of St John (Methodist) More images
Church of St Julitta	Hennett, St. Juliot	Parish church	15th century	17 December 1962	SX1290291221; 50°41′26″N 4°39′01″W	1222833	Church of St Julitta More images
Church of St Just	Gorran Haven, St. Goran	Church	15th century	10 February 1967	SX0127041613; 50°14′28″N 4°47′18″W	1144785	Church of St Just More images
Church of St Keyne	St Keyne	Parish church	15th century	21 August 1964	SX2422960810; 50°25′15″N 4°28′32″W	1140840	Church of St Keyne More images
Church of St Keyne	Kenwyn, Truro	Parish church	Consecrated 1259	29 December 1950	SW8196845852; 50°16′20″N 5°03′40″W	1205410	Church of St Keyne More images
Church of St Martin	Lewannick	Church	15th century	22 November 1960	SX2760480710; 50°36′02″N 4°26′15″W	1277508	Church of St Martin More images
Church of St Martin	St. Martin-in-Meneage	Parish church	15th century	10 July 1957	SW7350523640; 50°04′11″N 5°09′59″W	1265918	Church of St Martin More images
Church of St Mary	Botusfleming	Parish church	15th century	23 January 1968	SX4045661298; 50°25′47″N 4°14′52″W	1140249	Church of St Mary More images
Church of St Mary	Par, St. Blaise	Anglican church	1848–49	11 March 1974	SX0581653592; 50°21′01″N 4°43′51″W	1212089	Church of St Mary More images
Church of St Merryn	St. Merryn	Church	Extended 15th century	6 June 1969	SW8864174141; 50°31′44″N 4°59′01″W	1212764	Church of St Merryn More images
Church of St Mewan	St. Mewan	Parish church	12th century	10 February 1967	SW9983851849; 50°19′57″N 4°48′50″W	1327442	Church of St Mewan More images
Church of St Michael	Helston	Church	12th century	24 March 1950	SW6580127734; 50°06′12″N 5°16′35″W	1207743	Church of St Michael More images
Church of St Michael	Lawhitton, Lawhitton Rural	Church	13th century	22 November 1960	SX3554782356; 50°37′04″N 4°19′34″W	1219238	Church of St Michael More images
Church of St Michael	Lesnewth	Parish church	Probably Norman	17 December 1962	SX1307690304; 50°40′56″N 4°38′50″W	1327721	Church of St Michael More images
Church of St Michael	Newquay	Church	1909–11	24 October 1951	SW8112361528; 50°24′46″N 5°04′55″W	1144109	Church of St Michael More images
Church of St Michael	Porthilly, St Minver Lowlands	Church	Early 12th century	6 June 1969	SW9368775367; 50°32′30″N 4°54′47″W	1124714	Church of St Michael More images
Church of St Michael	Trewen	Church	15th century	22 November 1960	SX2519683560; 50°37′32″N 4°28′22″W	1263226	Church of St Michael More images
Church of St Moren	Lamorran, St. Michael Penkevil	Church	15th century	30 May 1967	SW8786041774; 50°14′16″N 4°58′35″W	1328931	Church of St Moren More images
Belfry of Church of St Moren	Lamorran, St. Michael Penkevil	Bell tower	Possibly 16th–17th century	27 November 1985	SW8783841756; 50°14′15″N 4°58′36″W	1141056	Upload Photo
Church of St Newlyna	Churchtown, St. Newlyn East	Anglican church	Late 12th–mid-13th century	30 May 1967	SW8289156349; 50°22′01″N 5°03′15″W	1137190	Church of St Newlyna More images
Church of St Nicholas	West Looe, Looe	Parish church	12th or 13th century	19 March 1951	SX2540253201; 50°21′10″N 4°27′20″W	1201132	Church of St Nicholas More images
Church of St Nicholas	Tresmeer Churchtown, Tresmeer	Parish church	Late 15th century	22 November 1960	SX2335587485; 50°39′37″N 4°30′02″W	1161299	Church of St Nicholas More images
Church of St Peter	Mevagissey	Church	Perhaps 12th century	28 November 1950	SX0125745248; 50°16′25″N 4°47′26″W	1210661	Church of St Peter More images
Church of St Petroc	Trevalga	Parish church	Partly rebuilt 13th century	17 December 1962	SX0810990032; 50°40′42″N 4°43′03″W	1223574	Church of St Petroc More images
Church of St Philip and St James	Maryfield, Antony	Parish church	1863–65	23 January 1968	SX4238956125; 50°23′02″N 4°13′06″W	1329073	Church of St Philip and St James More images
Church of St Phillack (St Felicitas)	Phillack, Hayle	Parish church	15th century	14 January 1988	SW5653538421; 50°11′44″N 5°24′45″W	1160143	Church of St Phillack (St Felicitas) More images
Church of St Rumon	Ruan Minor, Grade-Ruan	Parish church	13th century	10 July 1957	SW7210015224; 49°59′37″N 5°10′52″W	1141916	Church of St Rumon More images
Church of St Symphorian	Forrabury, Forrabury and Minster	Parish church	Norman	17 December 1962	SX0957390895; 50°41′11″N 4°41′50″W	1143467	Church of St Symphorian More images
Church of St Terminus	St Erney, Landrake with St. Erney	Parish church	Late 13th century	23 January 1968	SX3710259048; 50°24′31″N 4°17′38″W	1158530	Church of St Terminus More images
Church of St Thomas by Launceston	St Thomas, Launceston	Church	1482	27 February 1950	SX3279385062; 50°38′28″N 4°21′58″W	1196004	Church of St Thomas by Launceston More images
Church of St Werburgha	Warbstow	Parish church	15th century	22 November 1960	SX2053590344; 50°41′06″N 4°32′31″W	1161531	Church of St Werburgha More images
Church of the Holy Name	Boyton	Parish church	14th century	22 November 1960	SX3200292047; 50°42′13″N 4°22′50″W	1142944	Church of the Holy Name More images
Churchtown	Botusfleming	Farmhouse	Late 16th/early 17th century	23 January 1968	SX4035161284; 50°25′47″N 4°14′57″W	1312100	Upload Photo
Churchyard Cross immediately south-east of Church	Saltash	Cross	15th century	22 November 1982	SX4168958325; 50°24′12″N 4°13′45″W	1329256	Upload Photo
Chyrond	Veryan	House	c.1820	30 May 1967	SW9150839419; 50°13′05″N 4°55′26″W	1219588	Chyrond More images
Chyverton House	Chyverton, Perranzabuloe	Country house	c.Early–mid-18th century	28 February 1952	SW7968551132; 50°19′08″N 5°05′46″W	1141551	Upload Photo
Cliff Cottage and Step Cottage	Gorran Haven, St. Goran	House	c.mid-17th century	10 February 1988	SX0129141588; 50°14′27″N 4°47′17″W	1327045	Upload Photo
Clock tower and adjoining building about 15m south-west of Calenick House	Calenick, Kea	Clock tower	c.1750	12 March 1986	SW8207743168; 50°14′54″N 5°03′29″W	1159675	Clock tower and adjoining building about 15m south-west of Calenick House More images
Clock tower and attached steps, Treworgey	Liskeard	Clock tower	1733	22 July 1981	SX2403366552; 50°28′20″N 4°28′52″W	1206020	Upload Photo
Clocktower with stable yard and office yard adjoining Tregothnan to the north-east	Tregothnan Park, St. Michael Penkevil	Clock tower	18th century	27 November 1985	SW8570141626; 50°14′09″N 5°00′23″W	1141070	Upload Photo
Coach house and stabling about 20m north of the Home Farmhouse and including courtyard wall and gate-piers to front (south-east)	Kea	House	c.Early 19th century	30 May 1967	SW8039742241; 50°14′21″N 5°04′52″W	1159480	Upload Photo
Coach house with attached screen walls, gateway and retaining walls attached to south-east of Lanhydrock House	Lanhydrock Park, Lanhydrock	Coach house	1857	15 April 1988	SX0859063561; 50°26′26″N 4°41′49″W	1143089	Coach house with attached screen walls, gateway and retaining walls attached to south-east of Lanhydrock House More images
Codda Farmhouse and attached shippon, wall and pigsty	Altarnun	Farmhouse	17th century or earlier	23 November 1988	SX1800378395; 50°34′37″N 4°34′19″W	1142823	Upload Photo
Community Centre to north-west of Church of St Tetha	St. Teath	Church house	c.16th century	13 January 1988	SX0637880613; 50°35′35″N 4°44′13″W	1158789	Upload Photo
Compressor house, chimney, whim engine house and electricity substation at Robinsons Shaft, South Crofty Mine	Carn Brea	Whim house	1908	27 October 1999	SW6674641280; 50°13′31″N 5°16′18″W	1379231	Compressor house, chimney, whim engine house and electricity substation at Robinsons Shaft, South Crofty Mine More images
Coombe Mill	Coombe, Bude	Watermill	1842	29 September 1961	SS2099711708; 50°52′37″N 4°32′45″W	1141812	Coombe Mill More images
Cordys Close	Mylor	Chapel	c.Late 18th century	30 May 1967	SW7893338245; 50°12′10″N 5°05′57″W	1141659	Upload Photo
Count house and attached smith's shop at King Edward Mine	Camborne	Counting house	Late 19th century	12 September 1989	SW6631938929; 50°12′15″N 5°16′34″W	1142685	Upload Photo
Court Barton Farmhouse	Lanreath	Farmhouse	c.1612	27 August 1952	SX1815656795; 50°22′58″N 4°33′33″W	1137024	Upload Photo
Courtyard walls and gateway attached to front of Rialton Manor	Colan	Gate	15th century	12 May 1988	SW8477362221; 50°25′13″N 5°01′52″W	1144179	Upload Photo
Courtyard walls attached to south and east of Medros Farmhouse and Methrose Farmhouse, and font in courtyard	Luxulyan	Walls	Mid-17th century	28 August 1987	SX0506156303; 50°22′27″N 4°44′34″W	1311637	Upload Photo
Creekvean and attached entrance bridge and walls to road	Feock	House	1964–67	15 July 1998	SW8267838668; 50°12′29″N 5°02′49″W	1375676	Creekvean and attached entrance bridge and walls to road More images
Croan	Egloshayle	House	1696	6 June 1969	SX0296271598; 50°30′39″N 4°46′49″W	1159175	Upload Photo
Cromwell's Castle	Tresco, Isles of Scilly	Gun tower	1651–52	14 December 1992	SV8818115968; 49°57′44″N 6°20′58″W	1141198	Cromwell's Castle More images
Cross 1m north of Church of Saint Wenappa	Gwennap	Cross	c.13th century	3 February 1986	SW7387740113; 50°13′04″N 5°10′16″W	1136478	Upload Photo
Cross 2.3m to south of south porch of Church of Lanteglos by Fowey	Lanteglos	Cross	c.13th century	21 August 1964	SX1447451510; 50°20′03″N 4°36′30″W	1140332	Cross 2.3m to south of south porch of Church of Lanteglos by Fowey
Cross adjacent to south-east corner of Church of St Martin	Liskeard	Preaching cross	Possibly pre-Conquest	22 July 1981	SX2542664392; 50°27′12″N 4°27′38″W	1203163	Cross adjacent to south-east corner of Church of St Martin
Cross about 12m south of south transept of Church of Saint Corentin	Cury	Cross	Medieval	22 June 1987	SW6777221262; 50°02′46″N 5°14′42″W	1141758	Cross about 12m south of south transept of Church of Saint Corentin More images
Cross about 1 metre south of Church of St Credan	Sancreed	Cross	Pre-Conquest	15 December 1988	SW4202329345; 50°06′29″N 5°36′34″W	1311523	Cross about 1 metre south of Church of St Credan
Cross about 2m south of sacristy of Church of Saint Mylor	Mylor Churchtown, Mylor	Cross	Medieval	30 May 1967	SW8202635233; 50°10′37″N 5°03′15″W	1310590	Upload Photo
Cross about 10m south of Church of St Credan	Sancreed	Cross	Pre-Conquest	15 December 1988	SW4202329336; 50°06′29″N 5°36′34″W	1143823	Cross about 10m south of Church of St Credan
Cross in the churchyard about 2m east of chancel of Church of St Mawgan	St Mawgan, Mawgan-in-Pydar	Cross	Pre-Conquest or medieval	12 May 1988	SW8724565945; 50°27′17″N 4°59′55″W	1144129	Upload Photo
Cross in the churchyard about 3m south of south porch of Church of St Sidwell and St Gulval	Laneast	Cross	Pre-Conquest	23 November 1988	SX2279083978; 50°37′43″N 4°30′25″W	1311185	Cross in the churchyard about 3m south of south porch of Church of St Sidwell and St Gulval More images
Cross in the churchyard about 4m south of south porch of Church of St Meubred	Cardinham	Cross	10th century	6 June 1969	SX1230268683; 50°29′16″N 4°38′50″W	1143116	Cross in the churchyard about 4m south of south porch of Church of St Meubred More images
Cross in the churchyard about 5m west of tower of Church of St Nivet	Lanivet	Cross	Probably Pre-Conquest	6 June 1969	SX0391864210; 50°26′42″N 4°45′47″W	1143069	Cross in the churchyard about 5m west of tower of Church of St Nivet More images
Cross near south-east corner of St Michael's Mount	St. Michael's Mount	Cross	Medieval	9 October 1987	SW5144029813; 50°06′58″N 5°28′42″W	1327556	Cross near south-east corner of St Michael's Mount More images
Cross south-east of Pendean House (Pendean House not included)	Liskeard	Preaching cross	Possibly pre-Conquest	15 November 1993	SX2487464614; 50°27′19″N 4°28′06″W	1203204	Upload Photo
Cross to south of Church of St Hugo	Quethiock	Cross	Hiberno-Saxon	23 January 1968	SX3129764716; 50°27′29″N 4°22′41″W	1329439	Cross to south of Church of St Hugo
Crugsillick	Veryan	Country house	17th century	30 May 1967	SW9034239362; 50°13′01″N 4°56′25″W	1219187	Upload Photo
Cusgarne House	Gwennap	Farmhouse	Probably 17th century	3 February 1986	SW7589740799; 50°13′29″N 5°08′36″W	1140915	Upload Photo
Cusgarne Manor Farmhouse and mounting block to rear	Gwennap	Farmhouse	17th century	14 February 1985	SW7542040735; 50°13′26″N 5°08′59″W	1140913	Upload Photo
Custom House and rear courtyard walls	Falmouth	House	1814	23 January 1973	SW8109532527; 50°09′08″N 5°03′56″W	1270122	Custom House and rear courtyard walls More images
Custom House Quay and King Charles Quay, North Quay, quay walls and steps	Falmouth	Quay	1670	10 September 1968	SW8114232586; 50°09′10″N 5°03′54″W	1269983	Custom House Quay and King Charles Quay, North Quay, quay walls and steps
Cutcrew Sawmills	St. Germans	Corn mill	Late 18th century	9 October 1987	SX3378160123; 50°25′03″N 4°20′28″W	1158656	Cutcrew Sawmills More images
Dairy and Grotto	Prideaux Place, Padstow	Dairy	Early 19th century	20 May 1988	SW9133375623; 50°32′35″N 4°56′47″W	1212134	Dairy and Grotto More images
Dockacre House and attached road frontage walls	Launceston	House	16th and 17th century	27 February 1950	SX3331484628; 50°38′15″N 4°21′31″W	1195976	Upload Photo
Dovecot about 60m north of Antony House	Antony Park, Antony	Dovecote	Early 18th century	23 January 1968	SX4178856377; 50°23′09″N 4°13′37″W	1140711	Dovecot about 60m north of Antony House More images
Dovecote about 80m east of Cotehele House	Calstock	Dovecote	Late 16th/early 17th century	19 October 1987	SX4233968620; 50°29′46″N 4°13′27″W	1140259	Dovecote about 80m east of Cotehele House More images
Dovecote immediately to north-west of Harlyn House	Harlyn House, St. Merryn	Dovecote	Probably 18th century	20 May 1988	SW8719475102; 50°32′13″N 5°00′16″W	1212749	Upload Photo
Dovecote, Tintagel Vicarage	Tintagel	Dovecote	13th century	17 December 1962	SX0548488382; 50°39′45″N 4°45′13″W	1143440	Upload Photo
Downs (Roman Catholic Convent, part of St Michael's Hospital)	Hayle	Country house	c.1880	14 January 1988	SW5556036730; 50°10′48″N 5°25′31″W	1160452	Upload Photo
Dressing plant attached to south side of stamps at King Edward Mine	Camborne	Dressing shed	c.1902	12 September 1989	SW6638538892; 50°12′14″N 5°16′31″W	1142687	Dressing plant attached to south side of stamps at King Edward Mine
Druxton Bridge	Werrington	Road bridge	16th century	23 August 1957	SX3443488336; 50°40′16″N 4°20′40″W	1328037	Druxton Bridge More images
Dry house and attached carpenter's shop immediately to east of Count House (etc) at King Edward Mine	Camborne	Carpenters workshop	Late 19th century	12 September 1989	SW6634138950; 50°12′16″N 5°16′33″W	1328113	Upload Photo
Dry sand shop and green sand shop	Perran Wharf, Mylor	Iron foundry	c.Early–mid-19th century	30 May 1967	SW7761638429; 50°12′14″N 5°07′04″W	1141603	Dry sand shop and green sand shop More images
Duke of Cornwall's Light Infantry War Memorial	Bodmin	War memorial	1924	7 January 1994	SX0738766372; 50°27′56″N 4°42′55″W	1298217	Duke of Cornwall's Light Infantry War Memorial More images
East Berriow	North Hill	House	Probably early 16th century	22 November 1960	SX2740875765; 50°33′22″N 4°26′16″W	1249547	Upload Photo
Ebbingford Manor	Bude, Bude-Stratton	House	Late 16th century	5 March 1952	SS2059805999; 50°49′32″N 4°32′55″W	1328546	Upload Photo
Edgcumbe House	Lostwithiel	House	18th century	18 October 1949	SX1035859816; 50°24′27″N 4°40′13″W	1144230	Upload Photo
Eliot Terrace	St. Germans	Row	Mid-17th century	23 January 1968	SX3558857840; 50°23′51″N 4°18′53″W	1329181	Upload Photo
Engine sheds, stack and turntable	Par, St. Blaise	Engine shed	1870s	11 March 1974	SX0732753722; 50°21′07″N 4°42′35″W	1289905	Engine sheds, stack and turntable More images
Engineers Shop	Perran Wharf, Mylor	Engineering workshop	c.Early–mid-18th century	30 May 1967	SW7757338408; 50°12′14″N 5°07′06″W	1141643	Upload Photo
Ennys Farmhouse	St. Hilary	Farmhouse	17th century	9 October 1987	SW5589132693; 50°08′38″N 5°25′05″W	1143739	Upload Photo
Entrance gate piers and gates about 150m west of Trelowarren House	Trelowarren, Mawgan-in-Meneage	Gate piers	1660	22 June 1987	SW7187823960; 50°04′19″N 5°11′22″W	1159284	Entrance gate piers and gates about 150m west of Trelowarren House More images
Entrance to courtyard and flanking walls to north of Radford Farmhouse	Werrington	Gate	Early 17th century	11 February 1988	SX3180489008; 50°40′35″N 4°22′55″W	1142849	Upload Photo
Erth Barton	Saltash	House	17th century	17 January 1952	SX3811256334; 50°23′04″N 4°16′43″W	1159153	Upload Photo
Ethy House, including garden walls to north and east	St. Winnow	Country house	18th century	27 August 1952	SX1334857231; 50°23′07″N 4°37′37″W	1311893	Ethy House, including garden walls to north and east More images
Flanking walls and gateway to the bridge over the moat about 8m east of the Old Rectory	St. Columb Major	Gate	1851	12 May 1988	SW9119263908; 50°26′16″N 4°56′31″W	1144097	Upload Photo
Footbridge	Perran Wharf, Perranarworthal	Footbridge	c.Early–mid-19th century	30 May 1967	SW7755338420; 50°12′14″N 5°07′07″W	1160542	Upload Photo
Footbridge over lane to estate yard and flanking walls forming north end of mock fortifications to north-east of Prideaux Place	Prideaux Place, Padstow	Wall	Early 19th century	20 May 1988	SW9140475612; 50°32′35″N 4°56′44″W	1212128	Footbridge over lane to estate yard and flanking walls forming north end of mock fortifications to north-east of Prideaux Place More images
Former offices and remains of foundry of Harvey and Company	Hayle	Foundry	Late 18th century	29 April 1983	SW5582237164; 50°11′03″N 5°25′18″W	1143685	Former offices and remains of foundry of Harvey and Company
Former St Lawrence's Hospital	Bodmin	Apartments	1818	8 June 1972	SX0592066879; 50°28′10″N 4°44′11″W	1195283	Former St Lawrence's Hospital More images
Fowey Museum	Fowey	Merchants house	15th or 16th century	11 March 1974	SX1259251674; 50°20′06″N 4°38′05″W	1210657	Fowey Museum More images
Frenchman's Creek	Fowey	Exchange	15th century	11 March 1974	SX1262251661; 50°20′06″N 4°38′04″W	1210654	Upload Photo
Friends' Meeting House	Marazion	Friends meeting house	c.1688	9 October 1987	SW5184930701; 50°07′28″N 5°28′23″W	1143785	Friends' Meeting House More images
Froxton Farmhouse and Froxton	Whitstone	House	15th century core	12 October 1984	SX2567699806; 50°46′18″N 4°28′25″W	1142424	Upload Photo
Garden feature at south end of south terrace of Prideaux Place	Prideaux Place, Padstow	Wall	1740	20 May 1988	SW9139075453; 50°32′30″N 4°56′44″W	1212203	Garden feature at south end of south terrace of Prideaux Place More images
Garden railings and gate piers to Eagle House Hotel	Launceston	Gate	1764	13 September 1972	SX3305084699; 50°38′17″N 4°21′44″W	1280373	Garden railings and gate piers to Eagle House Hotel
Garden temple to south-west of Prideaux Place	Prideaux Place, Padstow	Garden temple	1738–39	20 May 1988	SW9131075540; 50°32′32″N 4°56′48″W	1212199	Garden temple to south-west of Prideaux Place More images
Garden walls and gate piers attached to right and rear left of Bank House	St Columb Major	Gate	1857	12 May 1988	SW9135863620; 50°26′07″N 4°56′22″W	1138191	Upload Photo
Garden walls and ramp to north-east of Keveral Barton	St. Martin-by-Looe	Wall	16th century	18 December 1985	SX2976955184; 50°22′19″N 4°23′43″W	1329342	Upload Photo
Garlenick	Grampound with Creed	House	1812	10 February 1967	SW9443050198; 50°18′57″N 4°53′20″W	1327444	Garlenick
Gate piers and courtyard wall adjoining Truthall and Truthall House	Sithney	Gate pier	17th century	10 July 1957	SW6547030200; 50°07′32″N 5°16′57″W	1310274	Upload Photo
Gate piers and flanking walls about 200m north of Bochym Manor House	Cury	Gate pier	Probably c.1699	10 July 1957	SW6906721039; 50°02′40″N 5°13′37″W	1141753	Gate piers and flanking walls about 200m north of Bochym Manor House
Gate piers and flanking walls at road entrance about 200m WNW of Trewoon	Budock	Gate pier	Late 17th century	10 July 1957	SW7598731299; 50°08′22″N 5°08′11″W	1236947	Upload Photo
Gate piers and gates west of Roskruge Barton Farmhouse and adjoining garden walls	St. Anthony-in-Meneage	Gate pier	c.Late 17th century	22 June 1987	SW7753823562; 50°04′14″N 5°06′37″W	1328594	Upload Photo
Gate piers about 10m south-east of Trewoon Manor House	Trewoon, Budock	Gate pier	Late 17th century	10 July 1957	SW7624831201; 50°08′19″N 5°07′58″W	1142696	Upload Photo
Gate piers at the south-west entrance to Penmellyn	St. Columb Major	Gate pier	c.1855	12 May 1988	SW9140163775; 50°26′12″N 4°56′20″W	1137996	Upload Photo
Gate piers, gates, flanking walls and railings	Budock	Gate pier	Early 18th century	10 July 1957	SW7829330063; 50°07′45″N 5°06′12″W	1146499	Gate piers, gates, flanking walls and railings More images
Gatehouse and barn about 3m east of Marsland Manor and walls between gatehouse and east front of Marsland Manor	Marsland Manor, Morwenstow	Gatehouse	Late 17th century	9 September 1985	SS2170416767; 50°55′22″N 4°32′17″W	1278377	Upload Photo
Gatehouse Cottage	Hugh Town, St. Mary's, Isles of Scilly	House	Late 16th/early 17th century	12 February 1975	SV9006510642; 49°54′56″N 6°19′08″W	1218853	Upload Photo
Gate piers and walls to north-west of Penhelae Manor	Penheale, Egloskerry	Gate pier	19th century	11 January 1989	SX2681888043; 50°39′58″N 4°27′07″W	1142959	Upload Photo
Gates, gate piers, walls and railings to front (east) of Treludick	Egloskerry	Gate	18th century	11 January 1989	SX2540388125; 50°40′00″N 4°28′19″W	1159988	Upload Photo
Gates, railings, screen walls and attached garden wall to Marlborough House	Falmouth	Gate	Early 19th century	23 January 1973	SW7994931967; 50°08′49″N 5°04′53″W	1270003	Upload Photo
Gear and Kerrow Farmhouse	St. Erth	Farmhouse	Early 18th century	14 January 1988	SW5785434402; 50°09′36″N 5°23′30″W	1143635	Upload Photo
Glanmor House	Hayle	House	c.1862	14 January 1988	SW5551036579; 50°10′43″N 5°25′33″W	1327660	Upload Photo
Glynn House	Glynn, Cardinham	House	Mid–late 18th century	15 June 1951	SX1134164944; 50°27′14″N 4°39′32″W	1143108	Glynn House More images
Golden Manor	Probus	Manor house	c.1520	28 February 1952	SW9204546847; 50°17′05″N 4°55′14″W	1141132	Golden Manor
Goonvean China Clay Works: engine house with boiler-house and detached chimney	St. Stephen-in-Brannel	Boiler house	1910	20 December 1988	SW9496655284; 50°21′42″N 4°53′03″W	1136944	Goonvean China Clay Works: engine house with boiler-house and detached chimney
Greystone Farmhouse	Greystone, Lezant	Farmhouse	15th century	11 May 1989	SX3626179958; 50°35′47″N 4°18′54″W	1291535	Upload Photo
Guard house, boundary wall and attached ancillary buildings, Maker Heights Barracks	Maker-with-Rame	Wash house	1804–08	26 January 1987	SX4352851370; 50°20′29″N 4°12′01″W	1329099	Upload Photo
Guildhall	Market Place, Helston	Guildhall	1839	22 May 1972	SW6593427471; 50°06′04″N 5°16′28″W	1196492	Guildhall More images
Guildhall	Liskeard	County court	1858	22 July 1981	SX2520364561; 50°27′17″N 4°27′49″W	1206610	Guildhall More images
Gun battery NNW of St Michael's Mount	St. Michael's Mount	Battery	17th century	9 October 1987	SW5139829861; 50°07′00″N 5°28′44″W	1143756	Gun battery NNW of St Michael's Mount More images
Gun battery west of St Michael's Mount	St. Michael's Mount	Battery	17th century	9 October 1987	SW5139829822; 50°06′59″N 5°28′44″W	1327572	Gun battery west of St Michael's Mount More images
Gwennap Pit	Busveal, St. Day	Mine shaft	1762	12 September 1989	SW7171741761; 50°13′54″N 5°12′08″W	1309719	Gwennap Pit More images

== See also ==
- Grade I listed buildings in Cornwall
- Grade II* listed buildings in Cornwall
  - Grade II* listed buildings in Cornwall (H–P)
  - Grade II* listed buildings in Cornwall (Q–Z)
