= Pipe Well, Liskeard =

Holy well in Cornwall, England

Pipe Well
- St Martin's Well
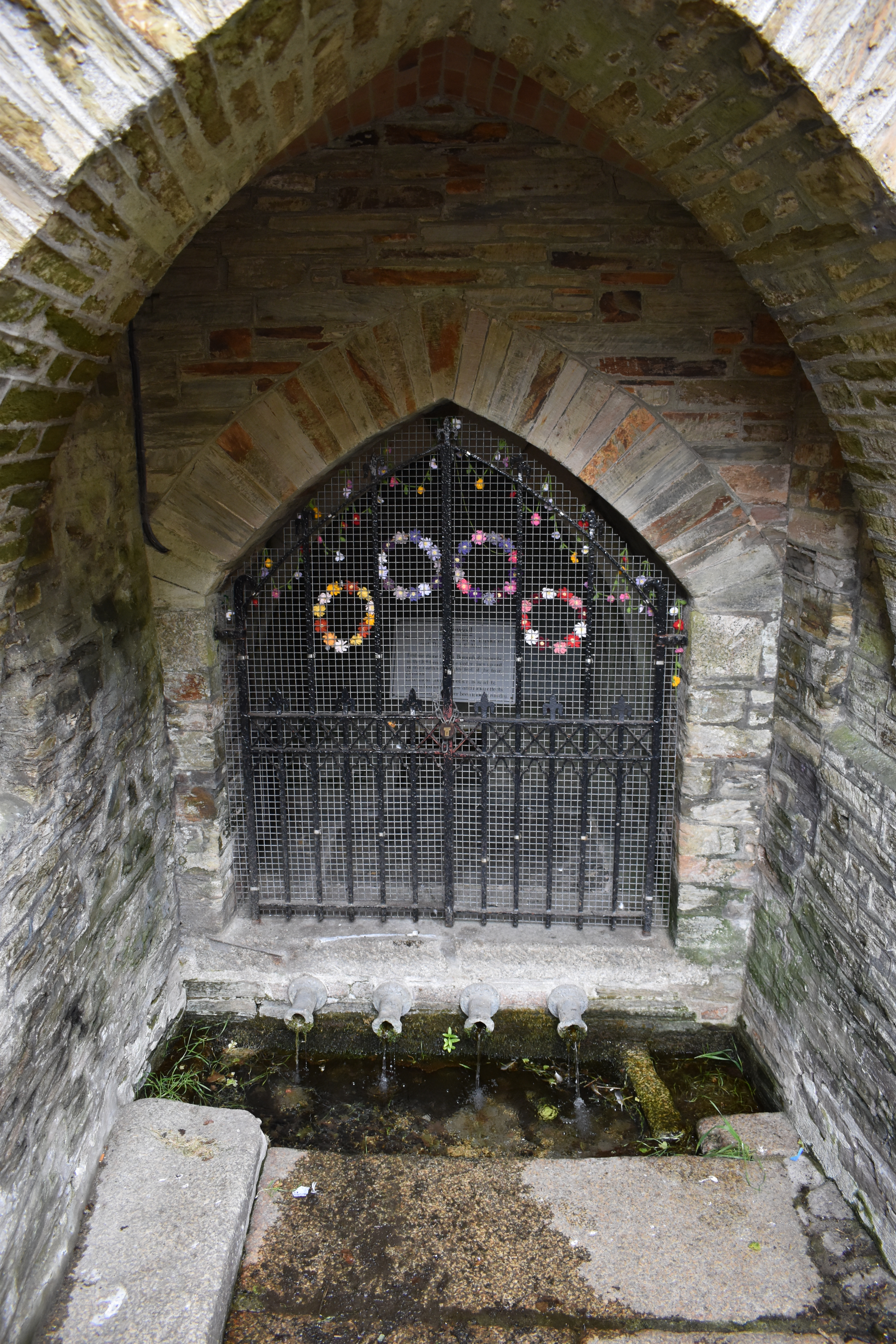
- Arch and trough at the well

- Location within Cornwall
- 50.454514°N 4.463519°W
- Location: Liskeard, Cornwall, England

Listed Building – Grade II
- Official name: The Pipewell
- Designated: 23 September 1950
- Reference no.: 1203201

The Pipe Well, also known as St Martin's Well or the Well of Lyskiret, is a holy well and historic water source located in the town of Liskeard in Cornwall, England, UK. The well is a Grade II Listed Building and was first listed in 1950.

== Description ==
The well is located on Well Lane in the town and is fed by four springs. It is within an arched room beneath an old building and is protected by a 19th century set of gates. In front of the gate is a granite trough which is fed by four lead spouts from which water from the well continuously flows. This is accessed by a flight of granite steps which leads downwards from the lane. The well has never yet been known to run dry.

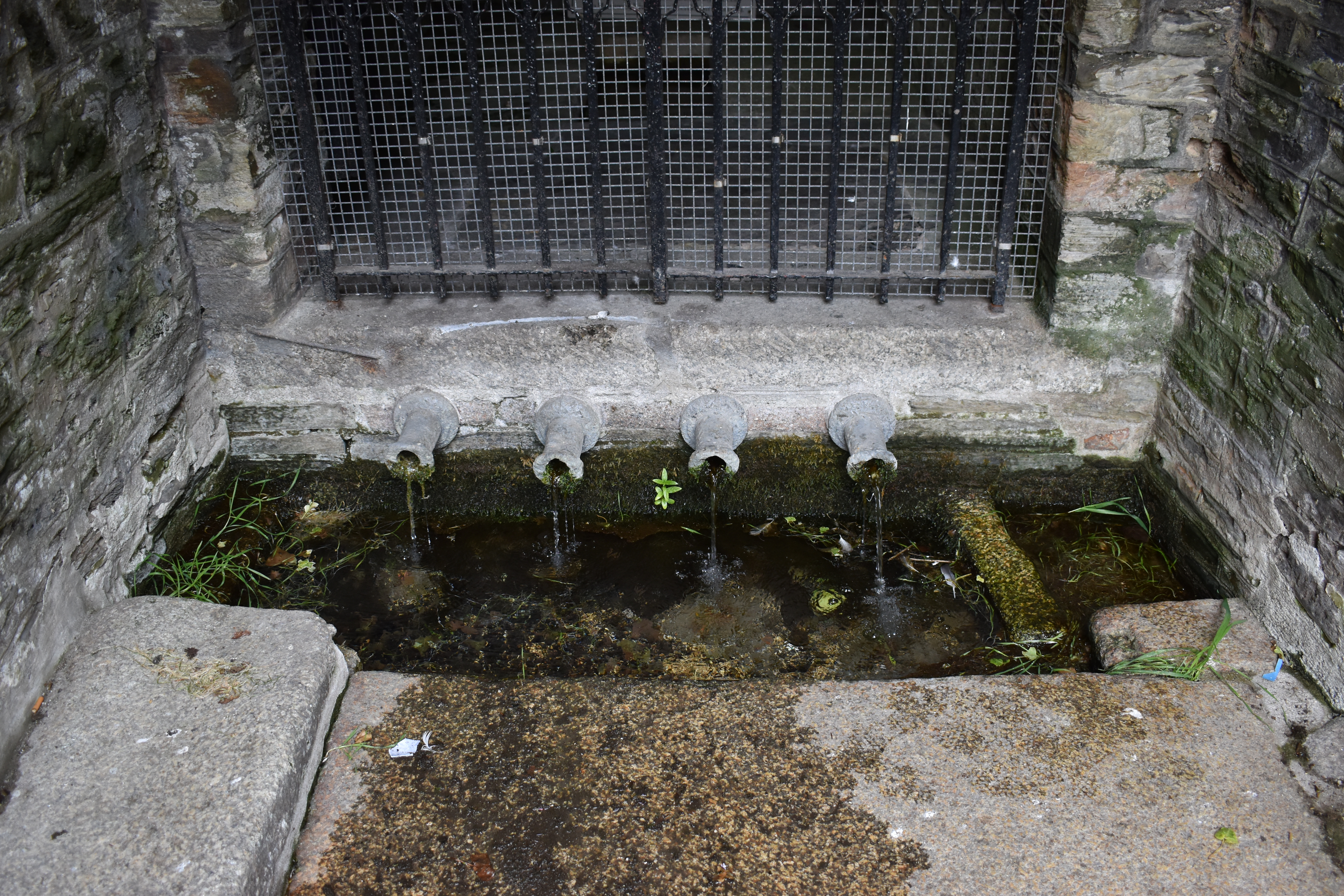
Pipes and trough.

== History ==
The first reference to the well is in 14th century borough documents.

The well was once said to have had healing powers. Also within the well is a stone (now covered over) which was said to bring good luck in marriage to women who touched it under certain circumstances.

In 2017, the Liskeard Town Forum launched an initiative to improve the area around the well, with £1000 of government funding.
