= Liskeard =

Town in Cornwall, England

Coordinates: 50.4536°N 4.4651°W

Liskeard: Cornish: Lyskerrys
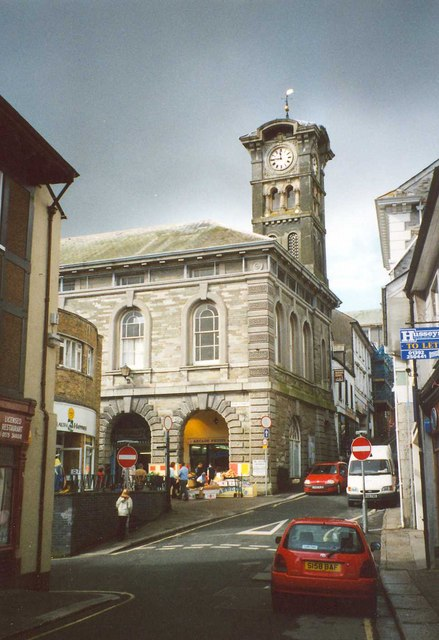
- Liskeard Guildhall (2001)

- Location within Cornwall
- Population: 10,902 (Parish, 2021)
- OS grid reference: SX251645
- Civil parish: Liskeard
- Unitary authority: Cornwall
- Ceremonial county: Cornwall
- Region: South West
- Country: England
- Sovereign state: United Kingdom
- Post town: LISKEARD
- Postcode district: PL14
- Dialling code: 01579
- Police: Devon and Cornwall
- Fire: Cornwall
- Ambulance: South Western
- UK Parliament: South East Cornwall

Liskeard (/lɪˈskɑːrd/ lih-SKARD; Cornish: Lyskerrys [lɪzˈkɛrːɪs]) is an ancient stannary and market town and civil parish in south-east Cornwall, England, United Kingdom. It is situated approximately 20 miles (32 km) west of Plymouth, 14 miles (23 km) west of the Devon border, and 12 miles (20 km) east of Bodmin. The Bodmin Moor lies to the north-west of the town. At the 2021 census the population of the parish of 10,902.

== History ==
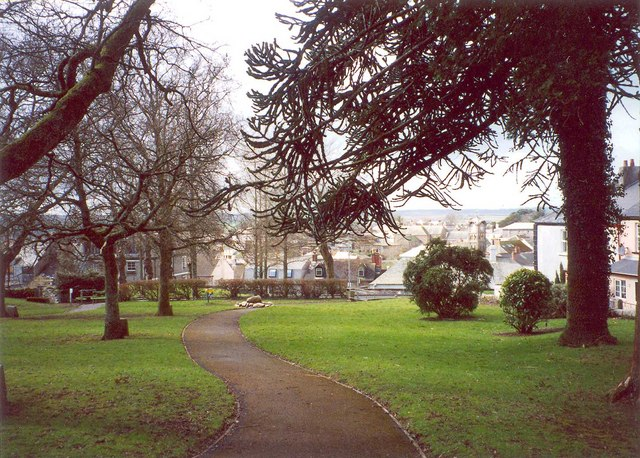
Castle Park, where Liskeard Castle once stood

The Cornish place name Lyskerrys derives from lys, meaning "court, admin centre" and the personal name Kerrys. King Dungarth whose cross is a few miles north near St Cleer is thought to be a descendant of the early 8th century king Gerren of Dumnonia and is said to have held his court in Liskear. Liskeard (Liscarret) was at the time of the Domesday Survey an important manor with a mill rendering 12d. yearly and a market rendering 4s. William the Conqueror gave it to Robert, Count of Mortain by whom it was held in demesne. Ever since that time it has passed with the earldom or Duchy of Cornwall. A Norman castle was built there after the Conquest, which eventually fell into disuse in the later Middle Ages. By 1538 when visited by John Leland only a few insignificant remains were to be seen. Sir Richard Carew writing in 1602 concurred;

Of later times, the Castle serued the Earle of Cornwall for one of his houses; but now, that later is worm-eaten out of date and vse. Coynages, Fayres, and markets, (as vitall spirits in a decayed bodie) keepe the inner partes of the towne aliue, while the ruyned skirtes accuse the iniurie of time, and the neglect of industrie.

Historically, Liskeard belonged to the ancient hundred of West Wivelshire

Liskeard was one of the 17 Antiqua maneria of the Duchy of Cornwall. The market charter was granted by Richard, Earl of Cornwall (brother of Henry III) in 1240. Since then, it has been an important centre for agriculture. The seal of the borough of Liskeard was Ar. a fleur-de-lis and perched thereon and respecting each other two birds in chief two annulets and in flank two feathers.

Liskeard was connected to the electric telegraph network in 1863 when the Electric and International Telegraph Company opened stations at Truro, Redruth, Penzance, Camborne, Liskard and St Austell.

When Wilkie Collins wrote of his visit to the town in his Rambles Beyond Railways he had a low opinion of it: "that abomination of desolation, a large agricultural country town". The town went through a period of economic prosperity during the pre-20th century boom in tin mining, becoming a key centre in the industry as a location for a stannary and coinage.

The A38 trunk road used to pass through the town centre but a dual carriageway bypass now carries traffic south of the town, leaving the town centre accessible but with low traffic levels.

== Present day ==
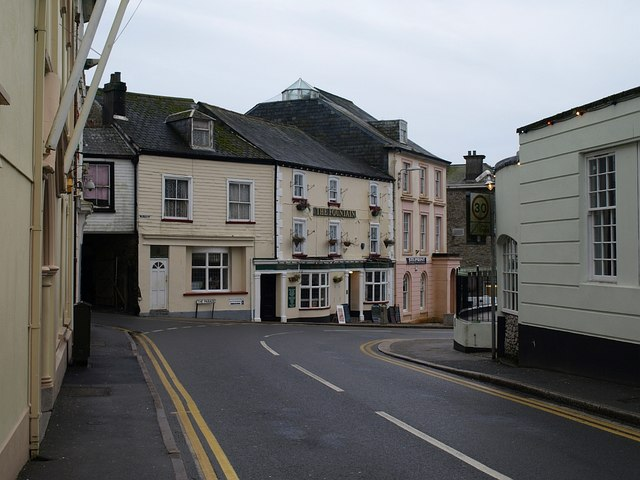
The Fountain Hotel

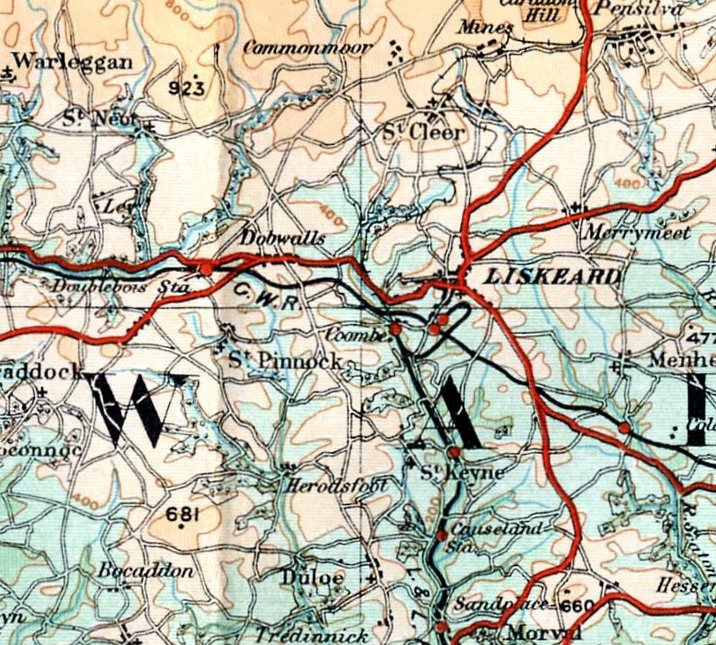
Liskeard and District in the 1920s

Liskeard was one of the last towns in Cornwall to have a regular livestock market, ending in 2017. There is a range of restaurants, cafés and pubs in the town, and some shops retain their Victorian shopfronts and interiors.

Liskeard puts on a pantomime in the last week of January and holds a carnival every June. Every July, Liskeard holds a large agricultural show, The Liskeard Show, which is always held on the second Saturday in July. St Matthew's Fair was originally established by charter in 1266, the fair was re-established in 1976 which runs in September/October. Every December, there is street entertainment and a lantern parade for 'Liskeard Lights Up', when the Christmas lights are switched on.

== Notable buildings ==
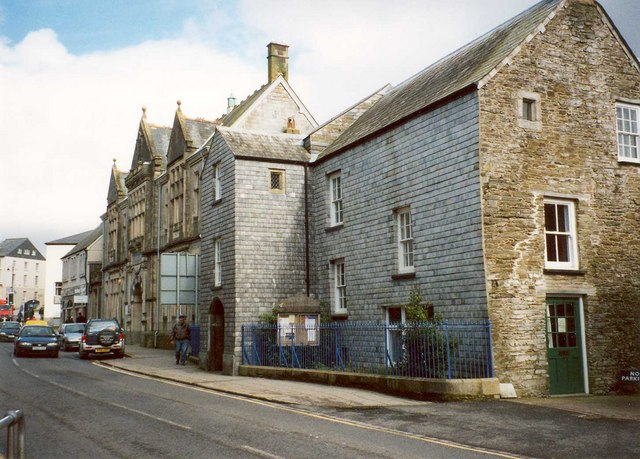
Stuart House

The town boasts St. Martin's, the second largest parish church in Cornwall Built on the site of the former Norman church, the oldest parts of the current structure date back to the 15th century. Other places of worship include a Roman Catholic church and Methodist chapels.

- The Foresters Hall now houses the Tourist Information Office and Liskeard & District Museum. The Foresters still meet in the town at the Public Rooms in West Street.
- Stuart House (on the Parade) was used by Charles I as a lodging in 1644, when his forces were chasing the Parliamentarians. Restored, it is now used as a community building for arts, heritage and community events
- Luxstowe House (1831). Designed by George Wightwick for William Glencross.
- Liskeard Guildhall was built in 1859 and has a prominent clock tower.
- The Public Hall was constructed in 1890.
- Webb's House (formerly Webb's Hotel) is a classic early Victorian market-town hotel featuring in royal visits, parliamentary declarations and much more but recently converted into flats and is the home of the local newspaper The Cornish Times.
- Pencubitt House was built in 1897 for J. H. Blamey, a wealthy wool merchant. The house was designed by local architect John Sansom, responsible for many Liskeard homes of that period.
- The Liskeard Union Workhouse, architect John Foulston of Plymouth (later the Lamellion Hospital, now flats).
- The Pipe Well, a holy well.

== Governance ==
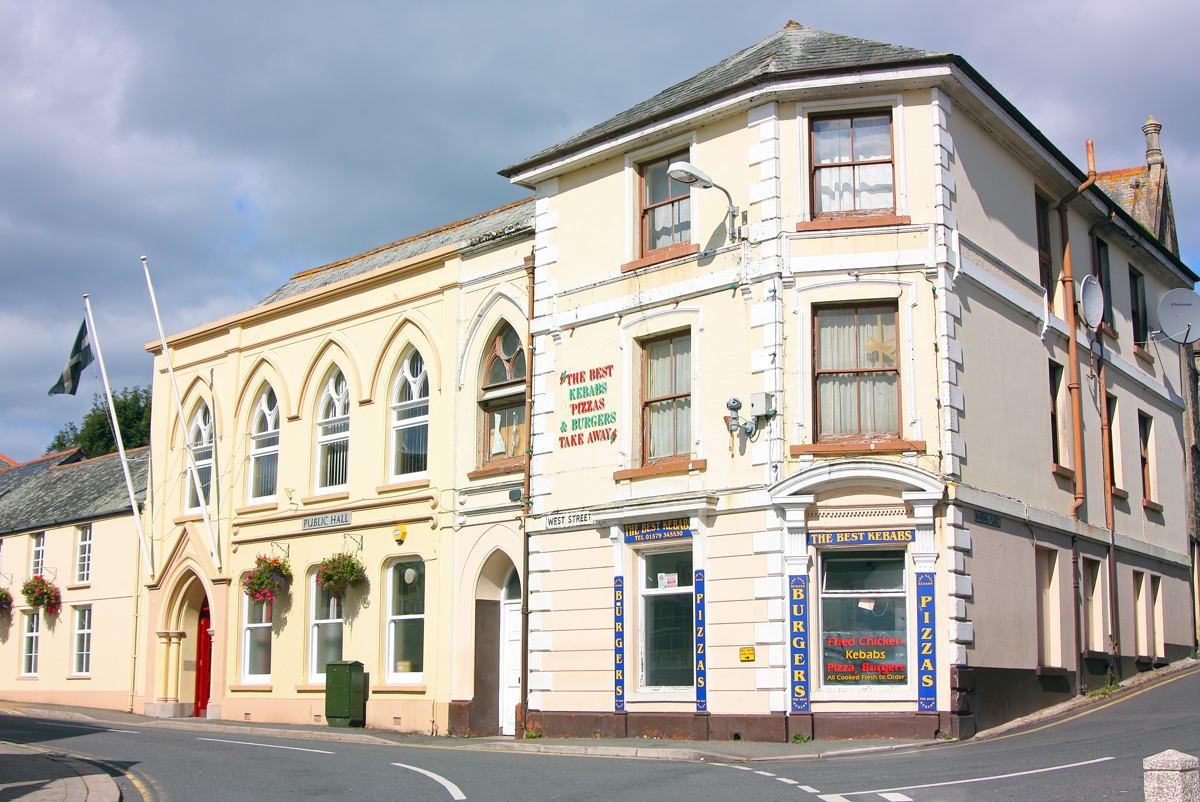
Public Hall, West Street

There are two tiers of local government covering Liskeard, at parish (town) and unitary authority level: Liskeard Town Council and Cornwall Council. The town council is based at the Public Hall and adjoining offices at 3–5 West Street.

For parliamentary elections, Liskeard forms part of the South East Cornwall constituency. The seat has been represented by Anna Gelderd of the Labour Party since the 2024 General election.

=== Administrative history ===
Liskeard was an ancient parish in the West Wivelshire hundred of Cornwall. As well as the town itself, the parish historically also covered surrounding rural areas, especially to the west and south of the town. There were several other settlements in the parish, including Dobwalls and Trewidland.

The town was an ancient borough, with its first known charter having been granted by Richard, Earl of Cornwall in 1240. The borough also served as a constituency for parliamentary elections from 1295, as the Liskeard parliamentary borough, returning two members of parliament. The constituency was reduced to having one MP under the Reform Act 1832, and was abolished in 1885.

From the 17th century onwards, parishes were gradually given various civil functions under the poor laws, in addition to their original ecclesiastical functions. In some cases, including Liskeard, the civil functions were exercised by subdivisions of the parish rather than the parish as a whole. In Liskeard, poor law functions were administered separately for area of the borough and the rest of the parish. In 1866, the legal definition of 'parish' was changed to be the areas used for administering the poor laws, and so the old parish was split into two civil parishes: 'Liskeard Borough' and 'Liskeard', the latter covering the rural parts of the old parish outside the borough.

The borough was reformed to become a municipal borough in 1836 under the Municipal Corporations Act 1835, which standardised how most boroughs operated across the country. In 1858, the borough council built Liskeard Guildhall at the corner of Fore Street and Pike Street to serve both as a courthouse and the council's meeting place. In 1929 the council moved its meetings to a new council chamber at the Public Hall on West Street, which had been built by a private company in 1890. In 1950 the council's offices, which had previously been based in rooms at the town's library, also moved to the Public Hall.

The borough of Liskeard was abolished in 1974 under the Local Government Act 1972, when the area became part of the new Caradon district. Caradon District Council based itself at Luxstowe House in Liskeard, which had been the offices of the old Liskeard Rural District Council (which had administered the surrounding parishes outside the borough) since 1947.

A successor parish called Liskeard was created as part of the 1974 reforms, covering the area of the abolished borough, with its parish council taking the name Liskeard Town Council. To avoid having two neighbouring parishes both called Liskeard, the rural parish of Liskeard was renamed Dobwalls and Trewidland at the same time.

Caradon was abolished in 2009. Cornwall County Council then took on district-level functions, making it a unitary authority, and was renamed Cornwall Council.

== Education ==
The first school in Liskeard was founded in 1550 on Castle Hill. For a time it was maintained by the Earls of St Germans, but it closed around 1834 due to a decline in numbers and financial difficulties. From 1835 a series of private schools existed in the borough, until 1908 when Cornwall Education Committee built the County School at Old Road. From 1945 it was known as Liskeard Grammar School until September 1978 when it became the Lower School site of Liskeard School, following amalgamation with the town's secondary modern school.

Liskeard County Secondary School received its first pupils on Monday 12 September 1960, and was formally opened by the Minister of Education, Sir David Eccles on 7 July the following year. Costing £100,000, it was built to accommodate around 500 pupils on the site of the current school at Luxtowe. Its glass and steel structure made "free use of fresh air and sunlight" according to local newspaper reports, whilst other modern features included a well-equipped gymnasium, automated central heating and synchronised clocks across the school, operated from the secretary's office. A new block was opened by Margaret Thatcher, Secretary of State for Education and Science in 1974, following the raising of the school leaving age from 15 years to 16, two years earlier. Like many similar secondary schools in Cornwall, from the late 1970s it housed the Upper School (3rd Year / Year 9 upwards), when it merged with the town's grammar school to create a split-site comprehensive school.

Twenty years later, with increased pupil numbers requiring many to be taught in temporary buildings, the need for improvements to Liskeard's secondary and primary schools was being raised in Parliament. By the late 1990s, Liskeard School and Community College had been extended at Luxstowe, and the Old Road site closed and redeveloped for housing. Further multimillion-pound science and technology facilities were added in 2002, and the original 1960s and 1970s buildings were completely modernised by 2011. As Cornwall's only school with an engineering speciality, it now caters for approximately 1300 students aged between 11 and 19, and employs around 200 teaching and non-teaching, full- and part-time staff. It also has a creche, a teenage advice and information service, a centre for children with autism, and facilities at Moorswater where some engineering-based courses are taught.

There are two primary schools in Liskeard: St Martin's Church of England (Voluntary Aided) School in Lake Lane and Hillfort Primary School on Old Road. The latter was opened in September 2006 following the renaming of Liskeard Junior School after its merger with Liskeard Infant School.

Caradon Short Stay School (previously known as a Pupil Referral Unit) is located in West Street, on the site of the former Liskeard Infant School. It provides education for students aged 11–16 from across south east Cornwall who are unable to attend a mainstream school or special school. The nearest independent schools are in Plymouth and Tavistock, Devon.

== Transport ==
Liskeard railway station, on the London Paddington to Penzance Cornish Main Line, and the A38 trunk road provide the town with rapid access to Plymouth, the rest of Cornwall and the motorway network. The town is also served by the Looe Valley branch line to Looe.

There are regular bus services to various parts of Cornwall. These are run by Stagecoach South West, Go Cornwall Bus and National Expess.

== Leisure and sports ==
There is a leisure centre at Lux Park on the north side of the town: there is a bowling club and Liskerrett Community Centre, that hosts athletic and leisure clubs, on the southern side. The town has a Non-League football club Liskeard Athletic F.C. who play at Lux park. The town also has a rugby and cricket club who are both well-supported. The town has a King George V Playing Field. Live music and various theatrical events frequently take place in the unusual but acoustically good Carnglaze Caverns just to the north.

=== Cornish wrestling ===
There were Cornish wrestling tournaments, for prizes, held in the field near the Union hotel at the canal, in a field on Station Road, Lux Park, Nanswhyden on Old Road and the field near the Fountain Inn. in Liskeard for centuries.

Abel Werry (?-1824), from Liskeard was for many years the champion wrestler of Cornwall during the 1700s.

=== Leisure trails ===
There are three trails, each has its own blue commemorative plaque (these were unveiled by former town mayor, Sandra Preston).

- Footpath from the town to the railway station: the path was built by Thomas Lang, who was a former mayor, in 1890.
- Trail around the north of the town centre, including the Parade and the ornamental fountain. The fountain was given to the town by Michael Loam, whose father (also called Michael Loam) invented the Man engine (a device for lifting men up and down mineshafts, and used in many mines throughout Cornwall & West Devon).
- Trail around the southern part of the town, commemorating Lt. Lapenotière, who brought back the news of the Battle of Trafalgar to England. For this Lt. Lapenotière was given a silver spice sprinkler by King George III. The sprinkler is still owned by the mayor's office, and is exhibited occasionally.

== Media ==
Local TV coverage is provided by BBC South West and ITV West Country. Television signals are received from the nearby Caradon Hill TV transmitter. Local radio stations are BBC Radio Cornwall on 95.2 FM, Heart West on 105.1 FM and its own community radio station Liskeard Radio broadcasting part time online. Its local newspaper is the Cornish Times (formerly Liskeard Gazette & Journal).

== Freemasonry ==
Liskeard has a sizeable Masonic presence with no fewer than eight Masonic bodies meeting at the Masonic Hall on The Parade,

- St Martin's Lodge No. 510 Date of Warrant, 5 March 1845
- St Martin's Royal Arch Chapter No. 510 Consecrated on 1 August 1865
- St Martin's Lodge of Mark Master Masons No. 379 Consecrated on 26 January 1888
- St Martin's Lodge of Royal Ark Mariners No. 379 Consecrated 1 June 1933
- Duchy Chapter of the Ancient & Accepted Rite of the Rose Croix of Heredom No. 289 Warranted on 10 December 1931
- Duchy Conclave of the Order of the Secret Monitor No. 260 Consecrated on 8 April 1975
- St Martin's Chapel No.27 of the Commemorative Order of St Thomas of Acon, Consecrated in 1998
- St Germans Court No. 97 of the Masonic Order of Athelstan, Consecrated in 2014

In addition to the UGLE lodges + Masonic orders, there is also a women's lodge that meets in the Masonic Hall.

== Twinning ==
In 1974 Liskeard was twinned with Quimperlé (Kemperle) in Brittany, France. In December 2023 it was announced that Liskeard had also been twinned with the town of Kopychyntsi in Ukraine.

== Notable people ==
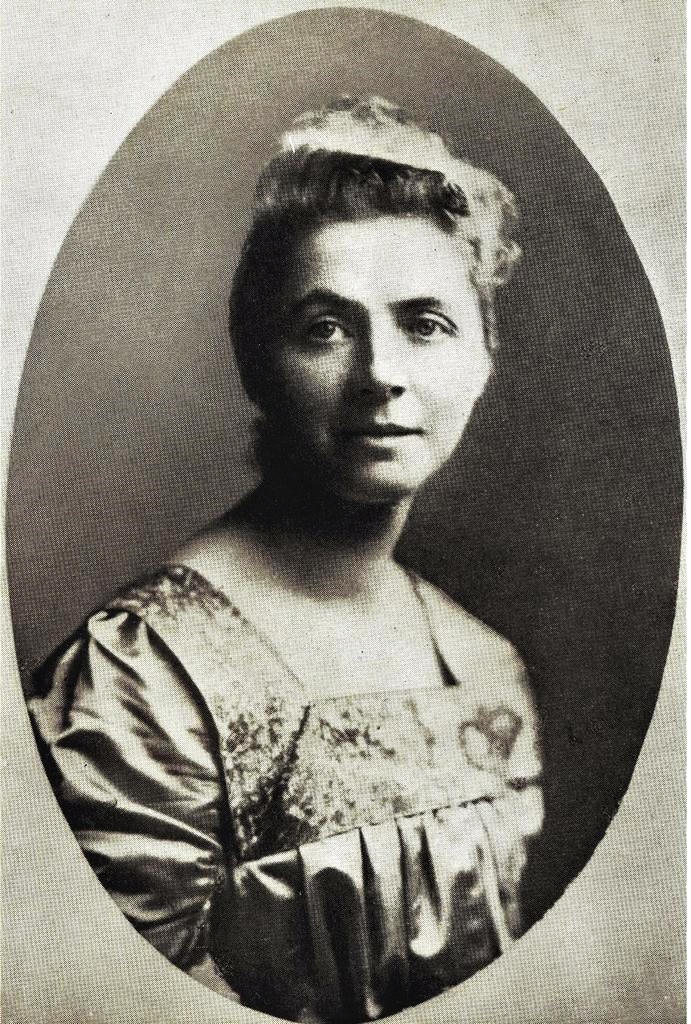
Emily Hobhouse, 1916

- Richard Hardinge (c. 1593–1658), Groom of the Chamber, delivered a message from Charles II of England to Essex the parliamentarian at Liskeard Aug 1644
- Joseph Jane (1595–1658), royalist politician and controversialist.
- John Harris (1596–1648), Royalist, elected four times as MP for Liskeard, between 1628 and 1644
- William Jane (1645–1707), an English academic and clergyman; son of Joseph Jane.
- Thomas Pooley (1806–1876), a controversialist thinker, imprisoned for blasphemy in 1857
- Charles Buller (1806–1848), barrister, politician, and local MP, 1832-1848.
- Richard Coad (1825–1900), architect, assistant with Sir George Gilbert Scott
- John Bellows (1831–1902), polymath, printer and lexicographer.
- Leonard Courtney, 1st Baron Courtney of Penwith (1832–1918), radical British politician, academic and advocated proportional representation.
- Emily Hobhouse (1860–1926), welfare campaigner, anti-war activist, and pacifist.
- Muriel Beaumont, Lady du Maurier (1876–1957), stage actress, 1898 to 1910; mother of the writer Daphne du Maurier
- Admiral Sir Philip King Enright (1894–1960), a Royal Navy officer, the first person to reach the rank of full admiral from the lower deck.
- William Henry Paynter (1901-1976), antiquary and folklorist, collected witch-stories and folklore
- Ian Donald (1910–1987), physician who pioneered the diagnostic use of ultrasound in obstetrics
- Harry Tobin (born 1944), cross-country skier, competed in the men's 15 kilometre event at the 1972 Winter Olympics
- Trevor Woodman (born 1976), rugby union footballer, played 140 games for Gloucester Rugby and 22 for England

== Climate ==
Like all of the United Kingdom, Liskeard has an oceanic climate (Köppen climate classification Cfb).

Climate data for Liskeard
Month	Jan	Feb	Mar	Apr	May	Jun	Jul	Aug	Sep	Oct	Nov	Dec	Year
Mean daily maximum °C (°F)	8 (46)	8 (46)	9 (48)	12 (54)	14 (57)	17 (63)	19 (66)	19 (66)	17 (63)	14 (57)	11 (52)	9 (48)	13 (55)
Mean daily minimum °C (°F)	3 (37)	3 (37)	4 (39)	5 (41)	8 (46)	11 (52)	13 (55)	13 (55)	11 (52)	9 (48)	6 (43)	4 (39)	8 (46)
Source: Weather Channel

== Freedom of the Town ==
The following people and military units have received the Freedom of the Town of Liskeard.

John Passmore Edwards 1823-1911.

=== Military Units ===
- The Royal British Legion (Liskeard Branch): 14 August 2022.

== See also ==
- Liskeard and Caradon Railway
- Liskeard and Looe Railway
- Liskeard and Looe Union Canal
