= Liskeard Guildhall =

Municipal building in Liskeard, Cornwall, England

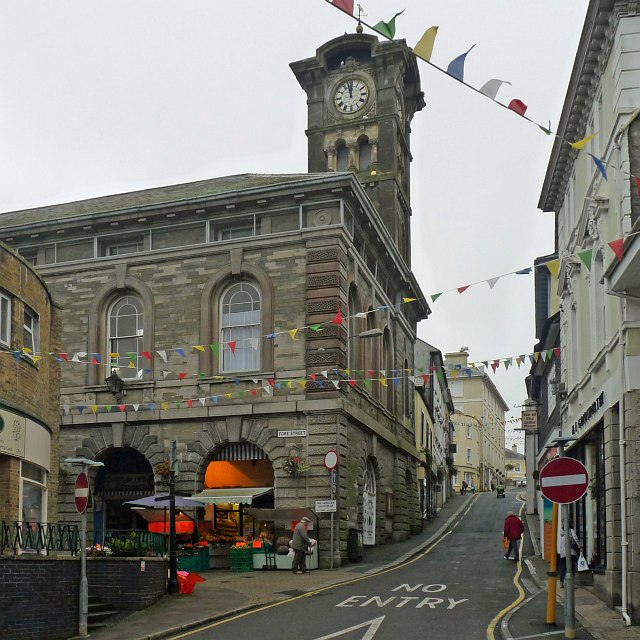
- Liskeard Guildhall

- Shown in Cornwall
- 50.4548°N 4.4637°W
- Location: Pike Street, Liskeard

History
- Built: 1858

Site notes
- Architect(s): Charles Reeves and Lewis George Butcher
- Architectural style: Italianate style

Listed Building – Grade II*
- Official name: Guildhall
- Designated: 22 July 1981
- Reference no.: 1206610

Liskeard Guildhall is a municipal building in Pike Street, Liskeard, Cornwall, England. The structure, which was the meeting place of Liskeard Borough Council, is a Grade II* listed building.

== History ==
The first municipal building in the town was a town hall built at the expense of the local member of parliament, John Dolben. The building was arcaded on the ground floor, so that markets could be held, with an assembly room on the first floor; it was surmounted by a clock and was completed in 1707. Dobel presided at the trial of the Anglican priest, Henry Sacheverell, who was impeached by the House of Commons on the charge of displaying contempt for a Commons resolution. Rioting supporters of Sacheverell threatened to burn down Dobel's house and hang him on a tree: the rioters subsequently pulled down the clock from the tower at Liskeard Town Hall.

In the mid-19th century, the borough leaders decided to demolish the old town hall and replace it with a new structure. The new building was designed by Charles Reeves and Lewis George Butcher in the Italianate style, built in ashlar stone and was completed in 1858. The design involved a symmetrical main frontage with five bays facing onto Fore Street; there was a loggia with five openings on the ground floor, five round headed sash windows on the first floor and projecting modillioned eaves at roof level. On the Pike Street elevation there were four bays with a doorway in the right hand bay and a central clock tower on the roof. The clock tower featured a pair of cast iron grilles in the first stage, a pair of round headed widows in the second stage, a set of clock faces in the third stage and open pediments above. The clock was designed and manufactured by Thomas Hale & Sons of Bristol and was a gift (together with the two quarter bells) from the mayor, John Clark Isaac, in 1868. Internally, the principal room was the council chamber.

In 1929 the council moved its meetings to a new council chamber at the public hall on West Street, which had been built by a private company in 1890. The council's officers and departments also moved to West Street, being housed at a building called the municipal offices adjoining the public hall.

The guildhall continued to be used for civic events, and retained its role as a courthouse, being used for coroner's court hearings and magistrates' court hearings until the magistrates moved to modern facilities at Culverland Road in 1987; much of the building was subsequently converted for retail and commercial use.

== See also ==
- Grade II* listed buildings in Cornwall (A–G)
