= Liskeard Castle =

- Liskeard, Cornwall
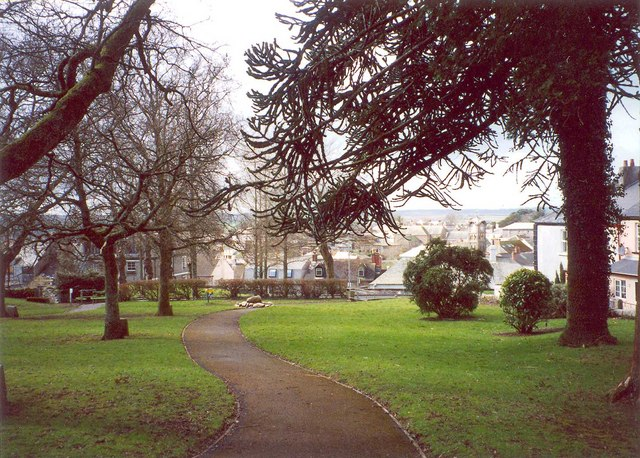
- Castle Park, where Liskeard Castle once stood. Photographed in 2001.

Site information
- Type: Motte-and-bailey
- Open to the public: Yes
- Condition: Destroyed

Location
- Shown within Cornwall
- Coordinates: 50.452908°N 4.465013°W

Site history
- Built: Between 1230 and 1240
- Built by: Richard of Cornwall
- In use: Until 14th century (as a castle); Until 16th century (as a cattle pound)
- Materials: Limestone

Liskeard Castle was a motte-and-bailey castle in the town of Liskeard in Cornwall. No extant remains survive of the castle.

Liskeard Castle was built between 1230 and 1240 by Richard of Cornwall and the castle was in ruins by 1337. It was repaired on two occasions, between 1341–42 and in 1361. When being repaired in 1377, the castle was described as 'a certain manor-house surrounded by a wall'. Repairs needed during the reign of Richard II (1377-1399) were neglected and by 1538 when visited by John Leland only a few insignificant remains were to be seen and the site was being used as a cattle pound. By the start of the 17th century, it is assumed that only earthworks of the castle remained. Sir Richard Carew writing in 1602 concurred;

Of later times, the Castle serued the Earle of Cornwall for one of his houses; but now, that later is worm-eaten out of date and vse. Coynages, Fayres, and markets, (as vitall spirits in a decayed bodie) keepe the inner partes of the towne aliue, while the ruyned skirtes accuse the iniurie of time, and the neglect of industrie.

The remaining earthworks of the castle were eventually flattened due to industry. The location of where the castle once stood is today known as Castle Park.
