= Liskeard School and Community College =

Coordinates: 50.455°N 4.476°W

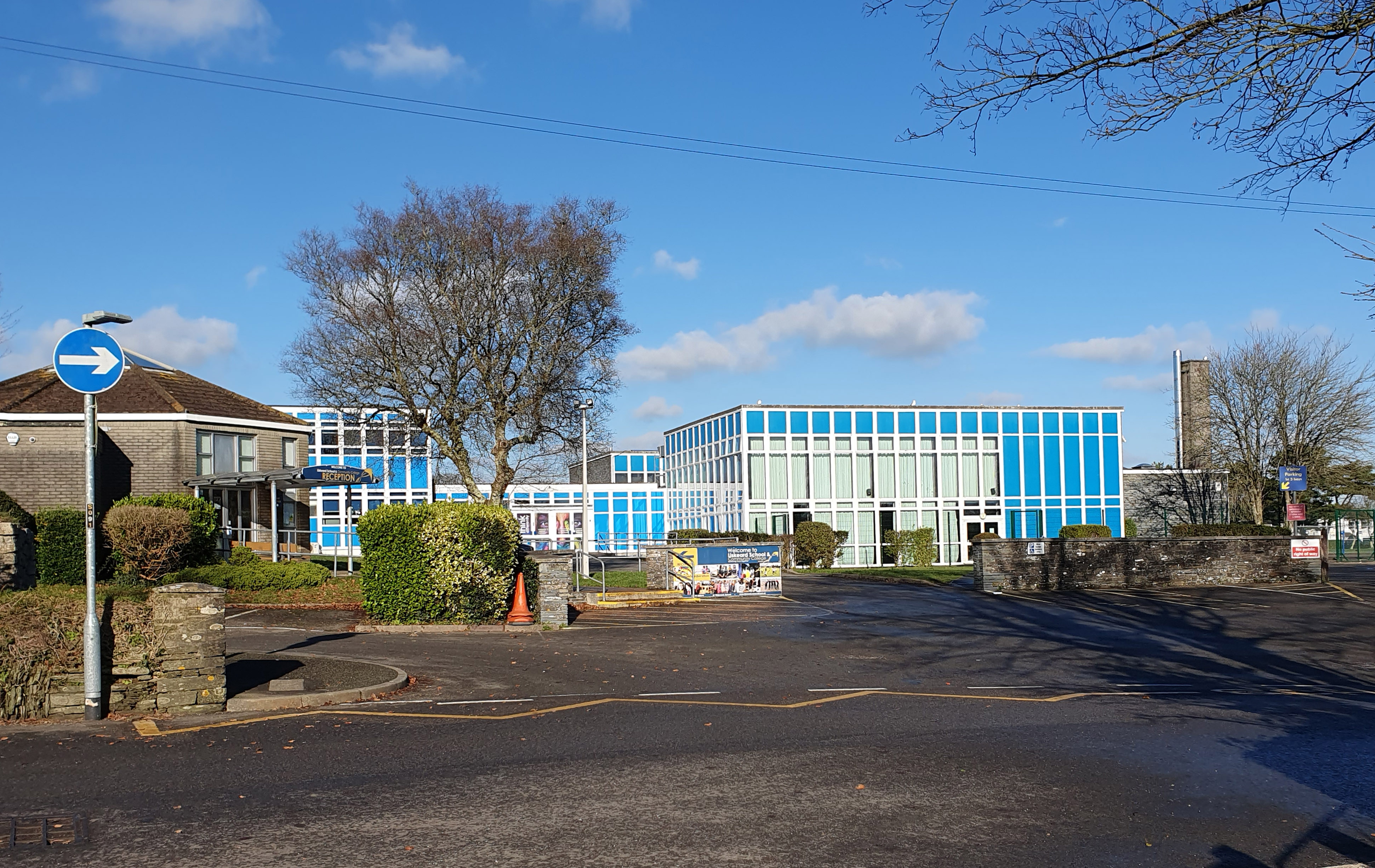
- School entrance in January 2023

Location
- Luxstowe; Liskeard, Cornwall, PL14 3EA; England

Information
- Type: Comprehensive; Academy
- Motto: Achieving More Together
- Established: 1550; 476 years ago re-founded in 1979
- Trust: South East Cornwall Multi Academy Regional Trust
- Department for Education URN: 144291 Tables
- Ofsted: Reports
- Head: Dan Wendon
- Gender: Coeducational
- Age: 11 to 18
- Enrolment: 1150
- Website: http://www.liskeard.cornwall.sch.uk/

Liskeard School and Community College is a coeducational comprehensive secondary school and sixth form with former engineering specialist status, located in Liskeard, Cornwall, England.

== History ==
The first school in Liskeard was founded in 1550 on Castle Hill, later site of a Civil War battlefield. For a time it was maintained by the Earls of St Germans, but it closed around 1834 due to a decline in numbers and financial difficulties. From 1835 a series of private schools existed in the borough, until 1908 when the Cornwall Education Committee built the County School at Old Road. From 1945 it was known as Liskeard Grammar School until September 1978 when it became the Lower School site of Liskeard School, following amalgamation with the town's secondary modern school.

Liskeard County Secondary School received its first pupils on Monday 12 September 1960, and was formally opened by the Minister of Education, Sir David Eccles on 7 July the following year. Costing £100,000, it was built to accommodate around 500 pupils on the site of the current school at Luxstowe. Its glass and steel structure made "free use of fresh air and sunlight" according to local newspaper reports, whilst other modern features included a well-equipped gymnasium, automated central heating and synchronised clocks across the school, operated from the secretary's office. A new block was opened by Margaret Thatcher, Secretary of State for Education and Science in 1974, following the raising of the school leaving age from 15 years to 16, two years earlier. Like many similar secondary schools in Cornwall, from the late 1970s it housed the Upper School (3rd Year / Year 9 upwards), when it merged with the town's grammar school to create a split-site comprehensive school.

Today, with increased pupil numbers requiring many to be taught in temporary buildings, the need for improvements to Liskeard's secondary and primary schools was being raised in Parliament. By the late 1990s, Liskeard School and Community College had been extended at Luxstowe Site, and the Old Road site closed and redeveloped for housing. A further multi-million pound technology facilities were added in 2002, and the original buildings were completely updated by 2011. Formerly Cornwall's only school with an engineering speciality, it now caters for approximately 1100 students aged between 11 and 19, and employs around 200 teaching and non-teaching, full- and part-time staff. It also has an advice and information service, a centre for children with autism and a Sixth Form College offering A-Levels and Level 3 Qualifications. The current headteacher is Dan Wendon, who took over from Alex Lingard in 2022. Dan Wendon is confirmed to be stepping down as headteacher on Monday 4th January 2027, to be Replaced by Tamsin Summers

In 2017 the school began the process of establishing a Multi-Academy Trust with other schools in South East Cornwall. They converted to academy status on 1 April 2017.

== Notable former pupils ==
- Francis Vyvyan Jago Arundell (1780–1846), antiquary and oriental traveller
- Merryn Doidge, rugby international
- Robert Stephen Hawker, clergyman, poet and eccentric
- Jane Johnson, novelist
- Humphrey Prideaux, scholar
- Bernard Deacon, local historian
- Walter Moyle, politician and political writer
- Trevor Woodman, English rugby union footballer
