= Calenick House =

Formerly Cornwall's largest tin smelting house (blowing house)

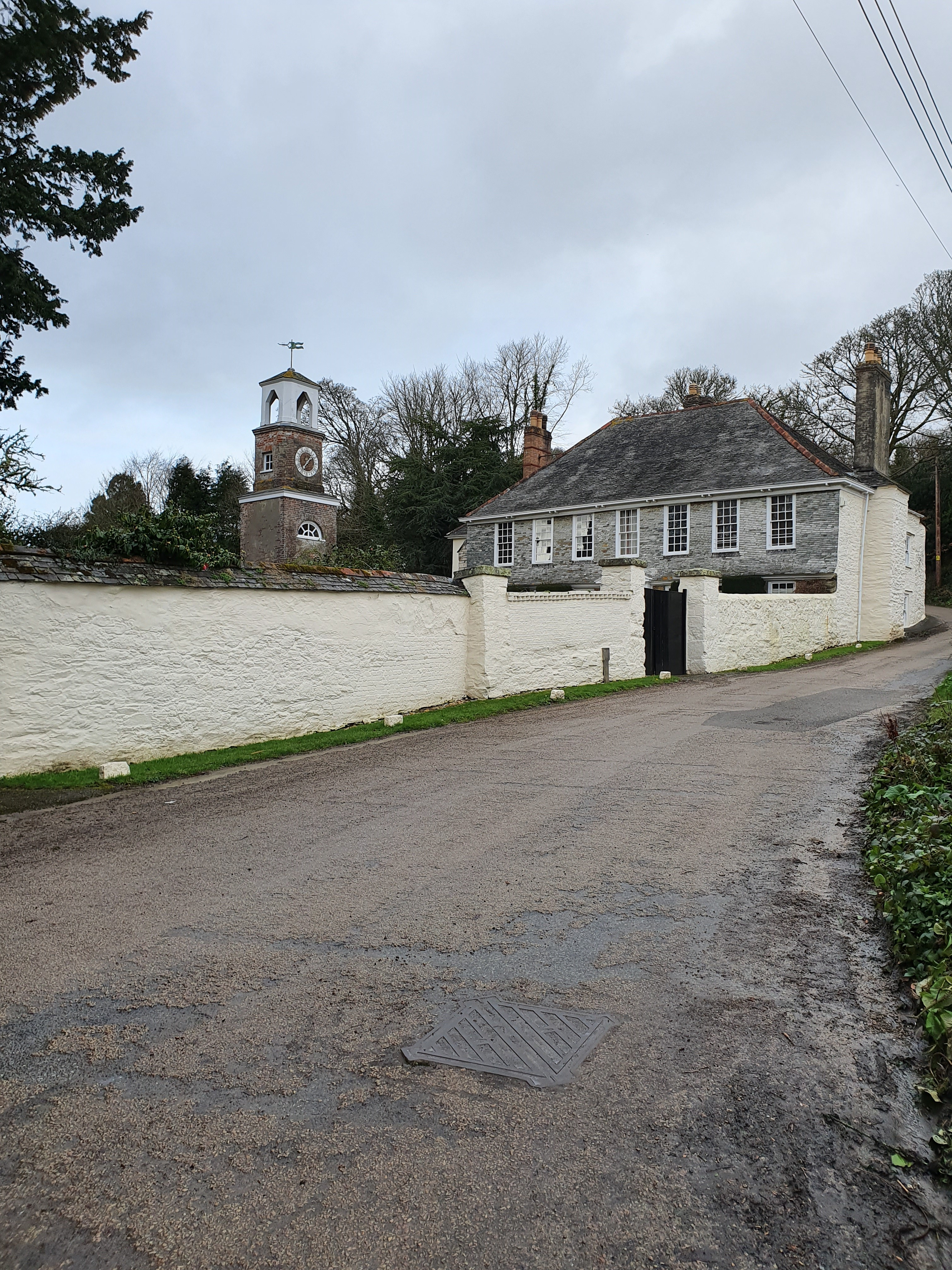

- Location within Cornwall
- 50.24768°N 5.05818°W
- Location: Calenick

History
- Built: 1702

Site notes
- Website: Calenick House

Listed Building – Grade II*
- Designated: 12 March 1986
- Reference no.: 1329027

Calenick House (Cornish: Klunyek Chi) Calenick House is the principal part of a country house that forms a prominent collection of Grade II* listed buildings within the hamlet of Calenick, approximately 1 mile (1.6 km) south of the City of Truro in Cornwall. The site also houses a Grade II* clock tower, as well as a Grade II listed weigh house.

Further detached buildings and ruins remain on the site which was once part of a tin smelting works. It is also the site of the manufacturing of Calenick Crucibles, which were a crucial part of the smelting process and were shipped worldwide, as far as Australia. Once the largest tin smelting blowing house, it had ten reverberatory furnaces by 1794. It is closely linked to the first known reverberatory furnace in Cornwall, at the nearby Newham Works (now known as Newham Industrial Estate) which transferred to the Calenick site in circa 1712. The site was in an advantageous position, near the head of Calenick Creek, with good access to water for power as well as an accessible route into the then coinage town of Truro. The site runs along the River Tinney which was once tidal to the western boundary of the site, however increased siltation of the creek, as well as changes in tides now see the river as a pleasant stream intersecting the hamlet. Calenick Bridge, at the head of the creek, is a grade II listed single-span bridge, built in the early 19th-century.

The area was once subject to a historical investigation by Professor R. F. Tylecote of Newcastle University, who is generally recognised as the founder of the sub-discipline of archaeometallurgy.
