= Trevor Woodman =

England international rugby union player

Trevor Woodman MBE
- Born: Trevor James Woodman; 4 August 1976 (age 50) Plymouth, England Spouse Kate Woodman
- Height: 1.80 m (5 ft 11 in)
- Weight: 112 kg (17 st 9 lb)
- School: Liskeard School and Community College
- Occupation: Rugby Coach

Rugby union career
- Position: Prop
Senior career
Years	Team	Apps	(Points)
1996–2004	Gloucester	140	
2004-2005	Sale Sharks		
- Correct as of 13 Sept 2006
International career
Years	Team	Apps	(Points)
1999-2004	England	22	(0)
- Correct as of 13 Sept 2006

Trevor James Woodman MBE (born 4 August 1976) is a former English rugby union footballer. He was born in Plymouth, but went to Liskeard School in Cornwall and won representative honours with Cornwall Under 16s.

Woodman moved from Cornwall and played first for Plymouth Albion and Bath before joining Gloucester Rugby in 1995. Whilst at Gloucester he was a replacement in the 2002 Zurich Championship Final (the year before winning the play-offs constituted winning the English title) in which Gloucester defeated Bristol Rugby, and started in the 2003 Powergen Cup Final in which Gloucester defeated Northampton Saints.

He appeared seven times for England A and won his first full cap coming off the bench for a 1999 World Cup warm-up match against the USA. Injury forced him out from what would have been his first tour, to South Africa in 2000, and although he also toured North America the following year, he failed to win a cap. His subsequent caps came from the bench until his first start against the All Blacks in November 2002. A neck injury forced him to withdraw from the remaining two autumn internationals and he was out of action for three months.

In March 2003, Woodman returned to the England squad and appeared as a replacement against both Scotland and Ireland. His World Cup starting position was sealed by strong performances in the pre-tournament matches. Woodman was England's loose-head prop in the World Cup final and became one of the best props in the game despite a career spent battling against injuries.

Woodman joined Sale Sharks for the 2004–2005 season but sustained a long-term back injury in training with the Sharks in September 2004. In the Summer of 2005, he was forced to retire at the age of 29 due to this injury.

Woodman provided commentary for Fox Sports in Australia, when England were there in July 2006 to contest the Cook Cup.

Woodman started his coaching career when he moved to Australia initially working with Sydney University before taking on the role of National Scrum Coach with the Australian Rugby Union.

Woodman's next career move saw him return to England when he undertook the role of Forwards Coach at Wasps, a position he held for four years. Woodman returned to his old club Gloucester Rugby to become their new Scrum Coach.
