= Botallack Manor =

Listed house in Cornwall

Coordinates: 50°08′20″N 5°41′10″W

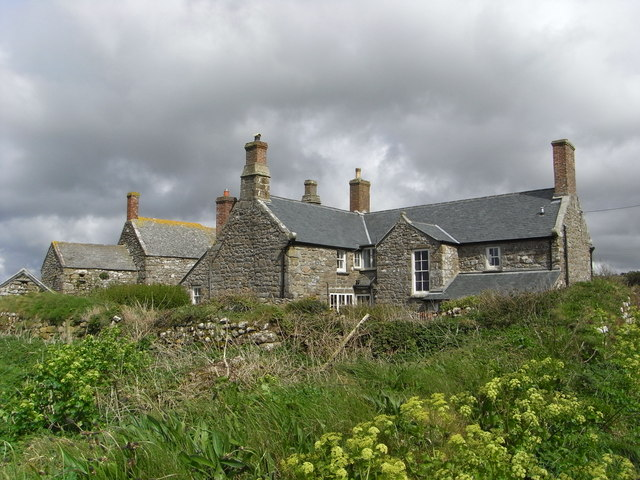
- Botallack Manor in 2009
- Location: Botallack, St Just, Cornwall, England
- Built: 17th century

Listed Building – Grade II*
- Official name: Botallack Manor House
- Designated: 26 April 1950
- Reference no.: 1143288

Botallack Manor was built in the 17th century. The house is featured in the BBC television series Poldark, and is a Grade II* listed building situated in St Just, Cornwall.

== History ==
Botallack Manor was built in the 17th century, and is believed to have been completed in the 1660s. It is built of granite rubble with a slate roof. The building is an L-shape. The house features two engravings from 1665 and 1688, and the main fireplace has an engraving from 1681. The manor farm contains Tudor era barns, as well as 18th and 19th century barns. The manor has views of the West Cornwall coast, and of the former tin mines nearby. In 1950, Botallack Manor became a Grade II* listed building; it is the only Grade II* listed building in the area.

In the 18th century, John Wesley preached from the garden of Botallack Manor. Botallack Manor featured in the 1975 BBC television series Poldark as Nampara, the home of title character Ross Poldark. Only the back of Botallack Manor was used for filming, due to the prevalence of electricity pylons. The front of the house in Poldark was from the nearby Pendeen Manor. The house has been visited by people from Australia, New Zealand, and Singapore, due to its use in Poldark. The house has also been used as a bed and breakfast.

Botallack Manor has been vacant since 2013, after the owner of the house died. It is currently in a state of disrepair, with windows boarded up and significant damage to the roof of the building. Additional damage has been caused by storms and vandalism. In 2019, Botallack Manor was added to Save Britain's Heritage's buildings at risk register. Restoration work on the house had been planned for 2021, having been delayed due to the COVID-19 pandemic, though as of 2022, no work had been started.
