= St Sennen's Church, Sennen =

Church in Cornwall, England

Coordinates: 50°04′13″N 05°41′41″W

St. Sennen's Church, Sennen
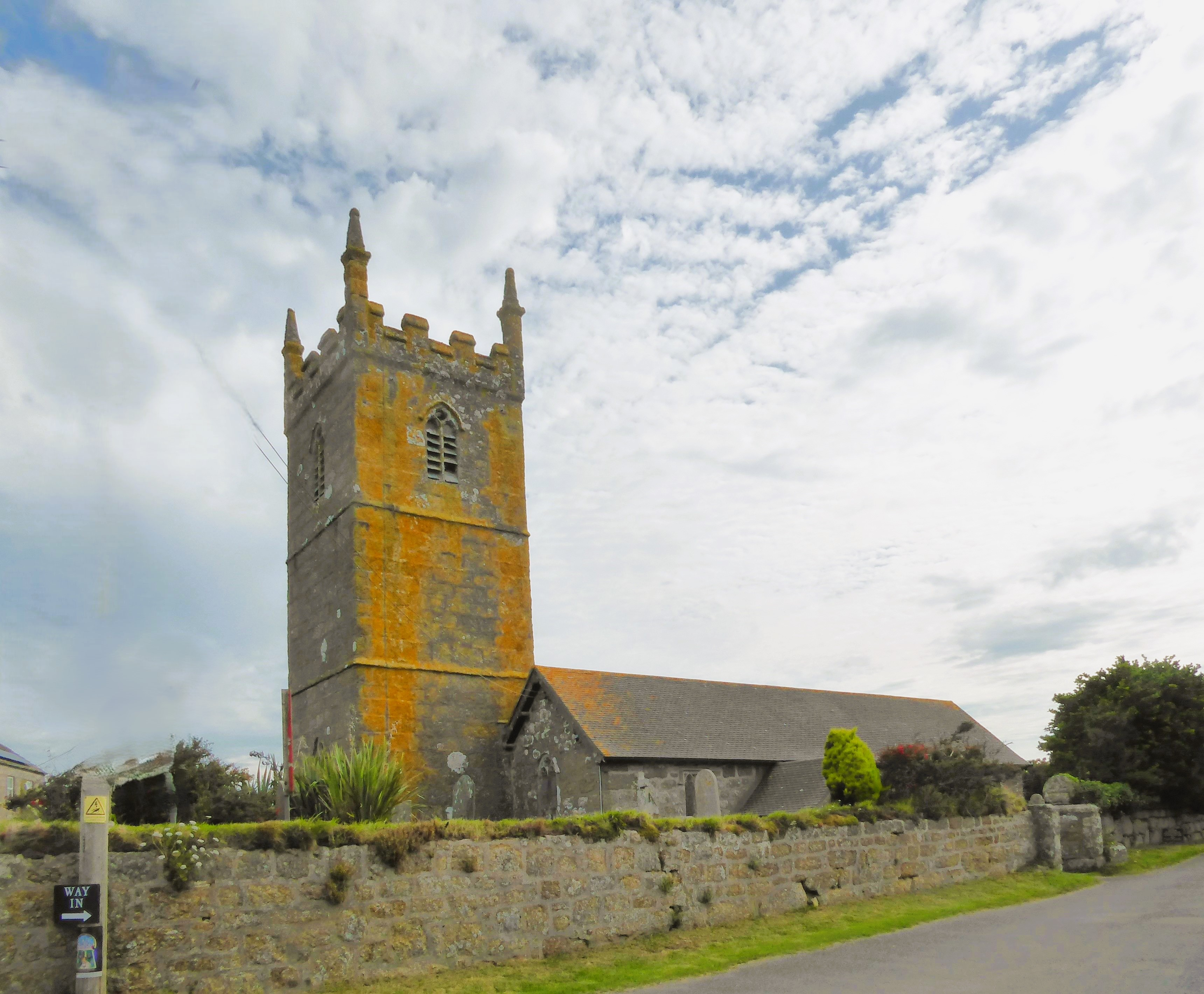
- St. Sennen's Church, Sennen
- St. Sennen's Church, Sennen
- Denomination: Church of England
- Churchmanship: Broad Church
- Website: www.sennen-cove.com/sennenchurch.htm

History
- Dedication: St. Sennen

Administration
- Province: Canterbury
- Diocese: Truro
- Parish: Sennen, Cornwall

Clergy
- Vicar: Revd Brin Berriman

Listed Building – Grade II*
- Official name: Church of Saint Sennen
- Designated: 15 December 1988
- Reference no.: 1143798

St. Sennen's Church, Sennen is a parish church in the Church of England located in Sennen, Cornwall, England, UK.

== History ==
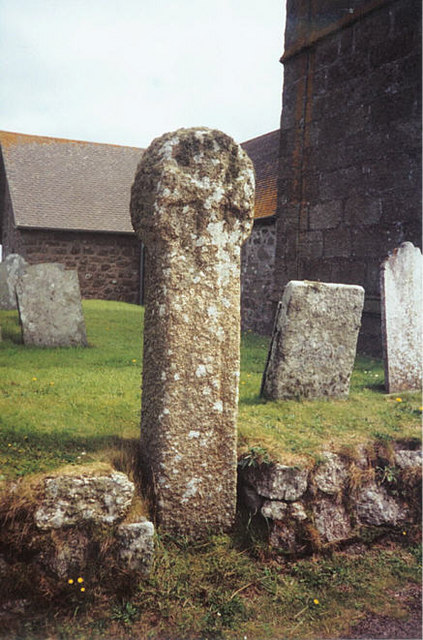
A Cornish cross in the cemetery

Sennen parish church is dedicated to St Sinninus (St Senán), a sixth century Irish saint, but has also been dedicated to St John the Baptist. There has been a church here since at least the 15th century. In 1327 and 1430 the patron of Sennen is described as a female saint Senana. However in later times it has been assumed that Senanus is the patron saint. The identification of this Cornish saint with St Senan of Scattery Island appears to have no foundation.

The church of St. Sennen is mediaeval. A visit by members of the Penzance Natural History and Antiquarian Society on their annual excursion in August 1893 resulted in a translation of a Latin inscription on a stone at the base of the font as ″In the year of the Lord 1441 [2, 3, or 4], this Church was dedicated on [the festival of] the beheading of St John the Baptist″. (The feast referred to is celebrated on 29 August.) It is known as the parish church of Land's End and the patron is the Duke of Cornwall.

The present church has a chancel and nave, a south aisle and a north transept. A wall-painting depicting two round embattled towers was uncovered during restoration in 1867. There is also a headless alabaster figure representing the Virgin Mary in the transept. The church has a three-stage battlemented tower housing a ring of three bells. In 1889 a peal of five bells were installed, replacing the old set of three. Whitechaple Foundry, London cast the bells and each had the following inscription; MEARS and STAINBANE, Whitechapel Foundry, London, 1889.

Each bell also had a further inscription:-

- Bell 1 – Recast 1889. John Isabell, rector. Edward Trembath, William Hollow, wardens.
- Bell 2 – To the Glory of God.
- Bell 3 – A memorial of Rev R. J. Roe's devoted ministry, 1871–1886.
- Bell 4 – Many donors, through Mary H. Isabell.
- Bell 5 – Ring out o'er land and seas.

There are five Cornish crosses in the parish. One is at Escalls and another at Sennen Green. Trevilley cross is one of only two crosses with a crucifixus figure on a cross carved onto the stone (there is a cross on the other side of the head). A cross on the churchyard wall came from a site near the Giant's Stone. A fine cross in the cemetery adjoining the churchyard was found in use as a footbridge near Trevear and moved to the churchyard in 1878. About 1890 it was moved to its present position.
