= Eagle House Hotel =

Grade II* listed Georgian townhouse & hotel in Launceston, Cornwall, England

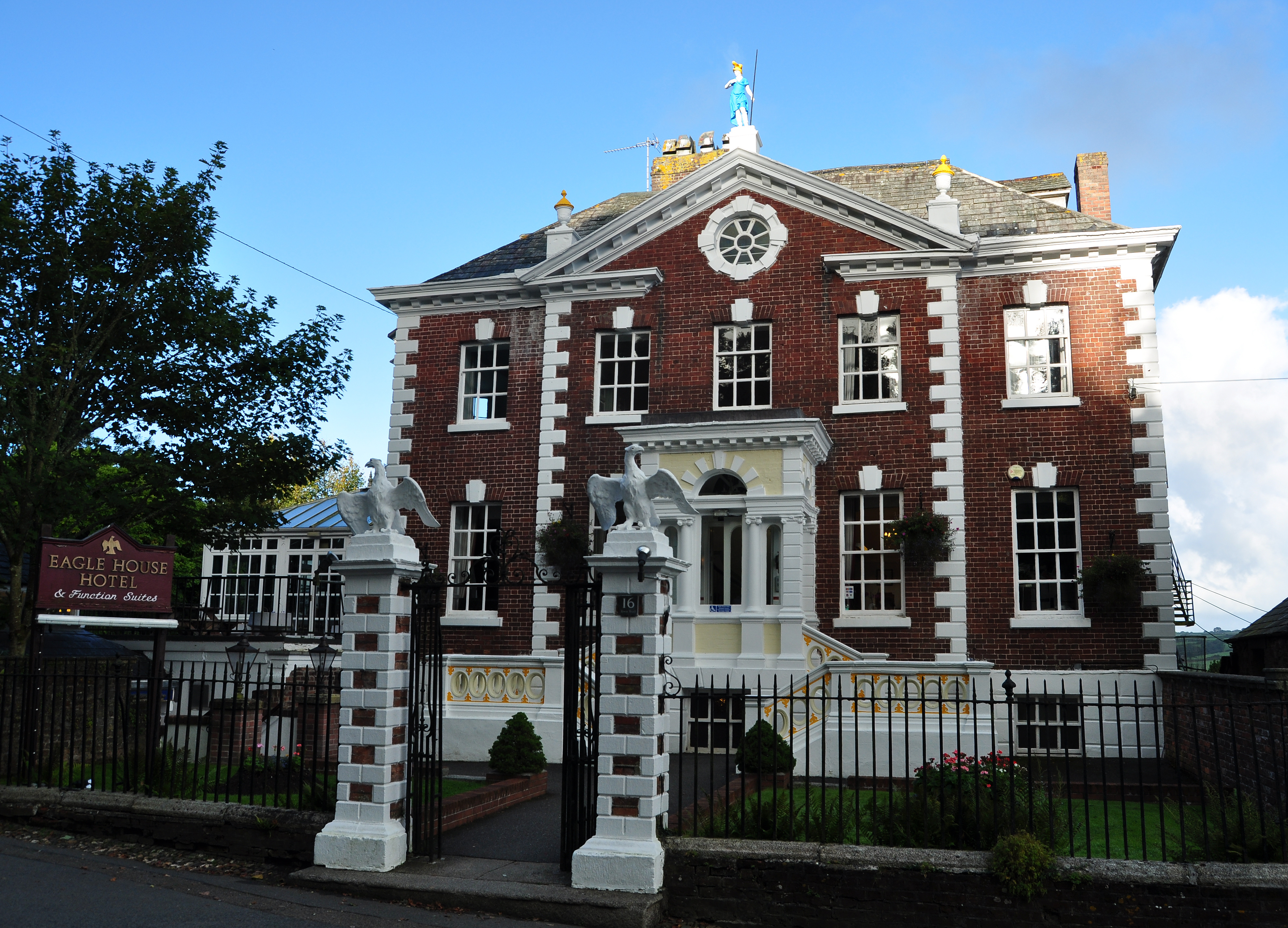

- Location within Cornwall
- 50.63810°N 4.36246°W
- Location: Launceston, Cornwall, England

Listed Building – Grade II*
- Official name: The Eagle House Hotel
- Designated: 27 February 1950
- Reference no.: 1297884

Listed Building – Grade II*
- Official name: Garden railings and gate piers to Eagle House Hotel
- Designated: 13 September 1972
- Reference no.: 1280373

Listed Building – Grade II
- Official name: Stables to south of Eagle House Hotel
- Designated: 13 September 1972
- Reference no.: 1206145

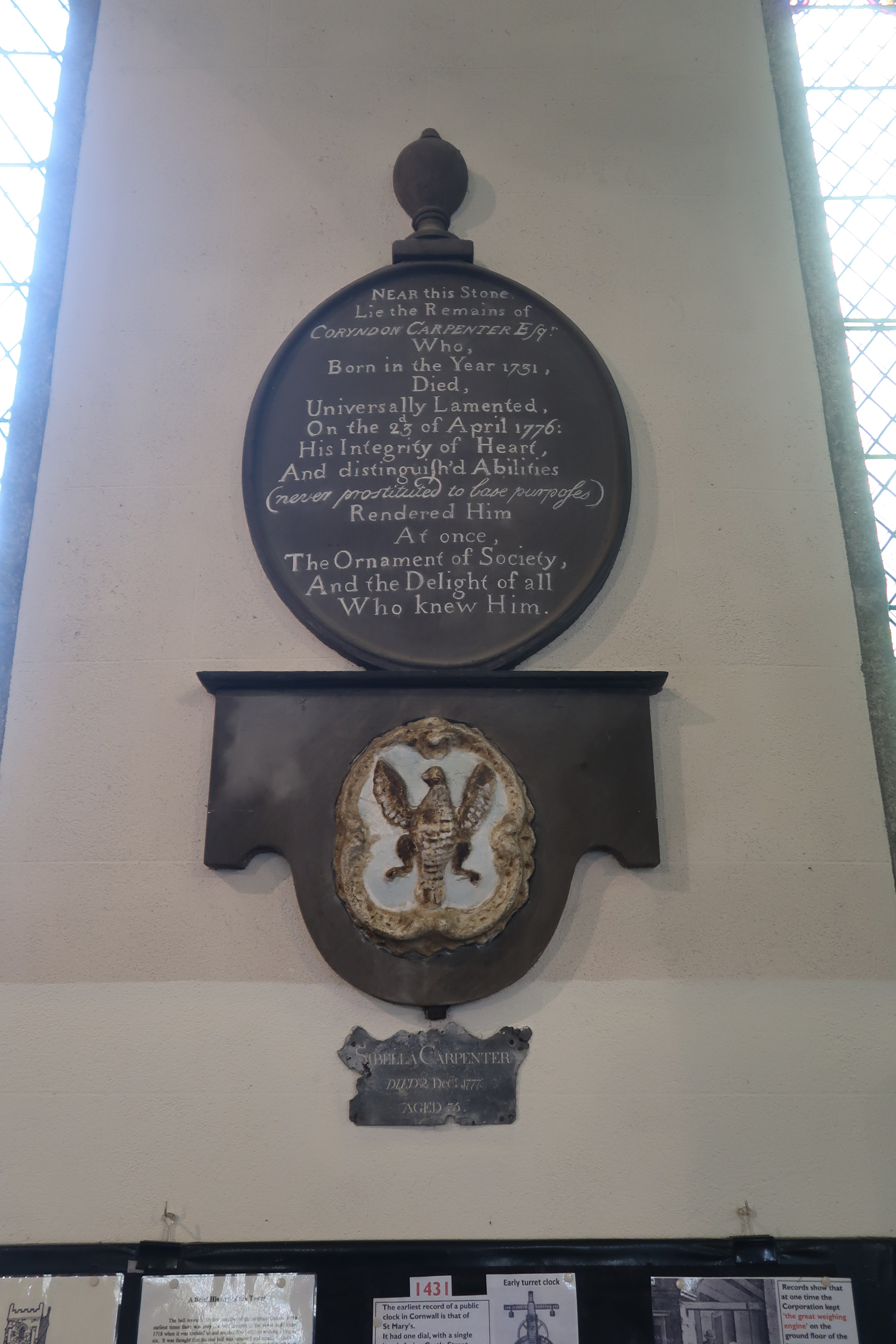
Coryndon Carpenter, died 23 April 1776, memorial in St Mary Magdalene's Church, Launceston, UK

Eagle House Hotel is a Grade II* listed building located in Castle Street, Launceston, Cornwall. Formerly a townhouse, it is now a hotel and is built in the Georgian style in red brick.

Charles Causley, Launceston's most renowned poet, wrote about the statues outside the property.

The building dates back to 1764, having been commissioned as a townhouse by Coryndon Carpenter, a former mayor of Launceston and the constable of Launceston Castle. Reputedly the house was partly financed by a £10,000 lottery win. In 1963 the building was converted into a hotel, also equipped with a restaurant area. By 2015 the building had fallen into disrepair and was considered for conversion back into a private house. It was eventually bought by the current owners, who renovated the property as a hotel with restaurant. It reopened in spring 2017.

== Early residents ==
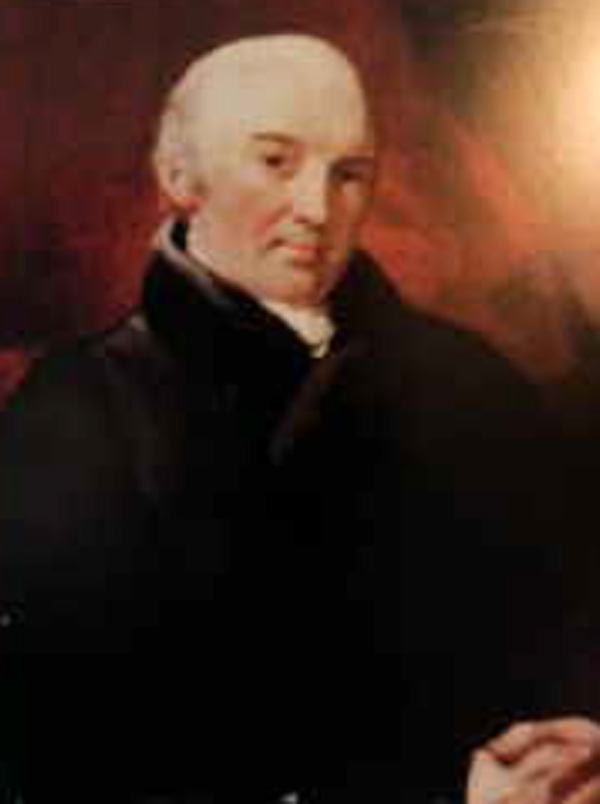
Christopher Lethbridge

Coryndon Carpenter (1731-1776) who built Eagle House in 1764 was born in Launceston in 1731. His father was Nathaniel Carpenter, an attorney in Launceston and at one time was mayor. His mother was Sibilla Luxmore. Coryndon followed in his father's footsteps and became an attorney and mayor and also held the position of Constable of the Castle.

In 1768 he married Elizabeth Luxmore (1727-1796) the daughter of Henry Luxmore of Okehampton, Devon but the couple had no children. He died in 1776 and Elizabeth continued to live at the house until her death in 1796.

Christopher Lethbridge (1760-1830) became the owner of the property soon after this. It is possible that he inherited the house as he was Elizabeth's nephew. His mother was Sibella Luxmore, Elizabeth's sister and his father was the Reverend John Lethbridge (1723-1796) of Launceston. Christopher became a lawyer and prominent member of the community. He was Town Clerk for three periods and Mayor three times, in 1809, 1818 and 1826. He served also as Under-Sheriff for Cornwall.

In 1785 he married Mary Copland and the couple had a large family. He was a personal friend of Philip Gidley King who lived in Launceston and later became the Governor of New South Wales. Two of his children married two of King's children.

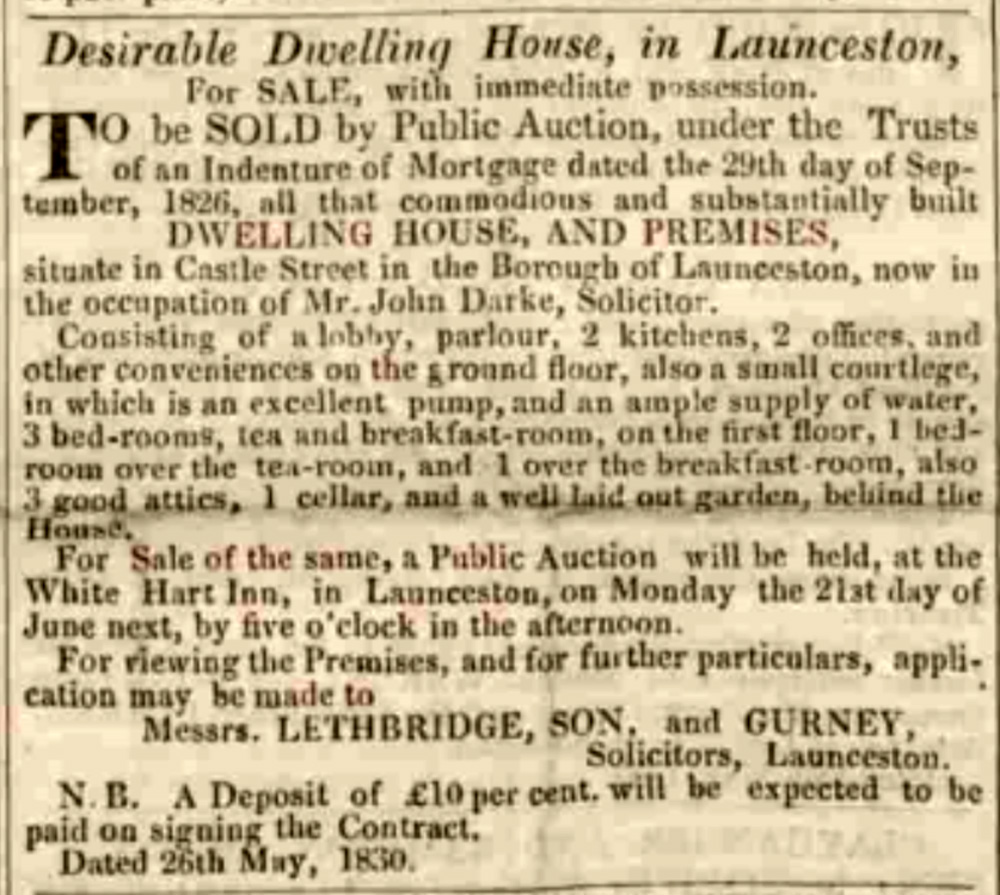
Sale notice for Eagle House in 1830

During the Napoleonic Wars which were from 1803 to 1815 many of the French Officers who were taken prisoner by the English were billeted at Launceston. The Royal Cornwall Gazette in 1806 reported the between thirty and forty French Officers were in the town. Eagle House was one of the places where they were housed. The French Imperial Eagles which adorn the gateposts of Eagle House were erected during this period. French Imperial Eagles were introduced by Napoleon Boneparte to be carried into battle. They sat atop blue regimental flagpoles and were carried at the head of the troops. When the officers were in Launceston they were allowed to stroll the streets of Launceston and other Cornish towns. Ten of them married Launceston girls in the period 1808–17.

It seems that Eagle House was sold in about 1826 to John Darke, an attorney and he sold it again in 1830. The sale notice is shown. The property was bought by Charlotte Augusta Harward who was the grandmother of Edward Archer.

Charlotte Augusta Harward (1763-1848) was born Charlotte Augusta Chambers and was the daughter of Sir William Chambers, the famous architect. Some of her letters to her father are kept by the Royal Academy. In 1791 she married Charles Harward (1766-1816) of Hayne House in Devon. They had one daughter Charlotte Catherine Harward who married Edward Archer (1792-1834) of Trelaske House and they had a son also called Edward Archer (1816-1885).

Charlotte Augusta Harward died in 1848 and Eagle House was put on the market for sale or to let. It was let for some years to Samuel Hicks a teacher who established it as a school called Eagle House Academy. He is shown in 1851 Census as living there in Castle Street with his wife Elizabeth and five pupils. In the late 1850s he moved his school to Priory House. The house was sold to the Dingley family soon after he moved.

== The Dingley family ==
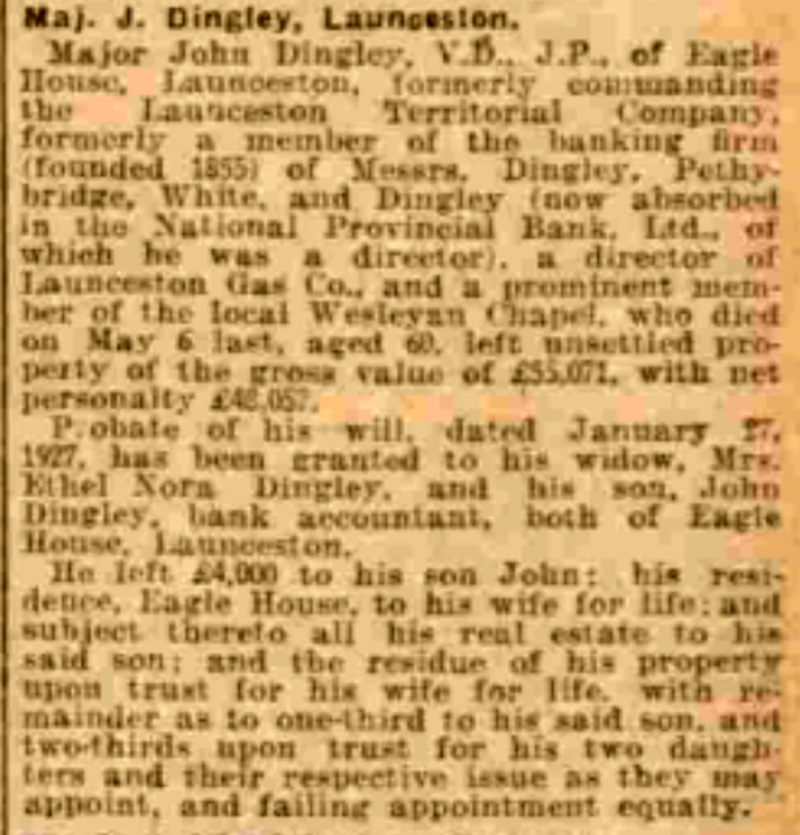
Will of John Dingle 1930

John Dingley (1829-1885) bought Eagle House soon after his marriage to Charlotte Shum in 1857. He was born in 1829 in Launceston. His father was Richard Dingley, who was an agent of Tavistock Bank and had served as Mayor of Launceston. In 1855 - together with his father, Edward Pethybridge and George White - John formed the Launceston Bank. This bank eventually became part of NatWest.

John and Charlotte had four children: three daughters and one son. The couple both died in 1885 in Launceston, and the house was inherited by their son John Dingle (1870-1930). He joined the family banking firm, and in 1899 married Ethel Nora Dingle (1875-1965), a distant relative. The couple had three children: a son and two daughters. John died in 1930, leaving the house to Ethel for as long as she lived and after that to his son John.

Their youngest daughter Guinevere married Francis Hamilton Stuart, a diplomat, in 1938. He wrote a book about his life, and in it he mentioned Eagle House several times.

In 1962 Ethel moved to her seaside cottage which she called “Dingley Dell” at Crackington Haven, and Eagle House was sold to Colin Gillbard. She died at her cottage in 1965 at the age of 90.
