= Botallack =

Village in Cornwall, England

Coordinates: 50°08′N 5°41′W

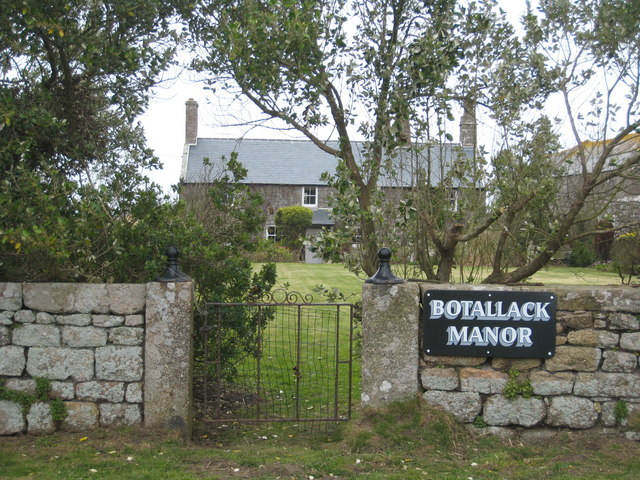
Botallack Manor

Botallack (Cornish: Bostalek, meaning "Talek's dwelling") is a village in west Cornwall, England, United Kingdom. It lies along the B3306 road which connects St Ives in the east to the A30 road, near Land's End. The village is included in the St Just in Penwith division on Cornwall Council. The original 1970s BBC television series Poldark was filmed partly in Botallack, using Manor Farm as Nampara. The Manor House, part of the Tregothnan estate, is a Grade II* listed building, dating from the 17th century.

Lae Maen Veor (Cornish: Legh Men Veur meaning great stone ledge), or Botallack Head, is a headland to the north west of Botallack.

The local community radio station is Coast FM (formerly Penwith Radio), which broadcasts on 96.5 and 97.2 FM.

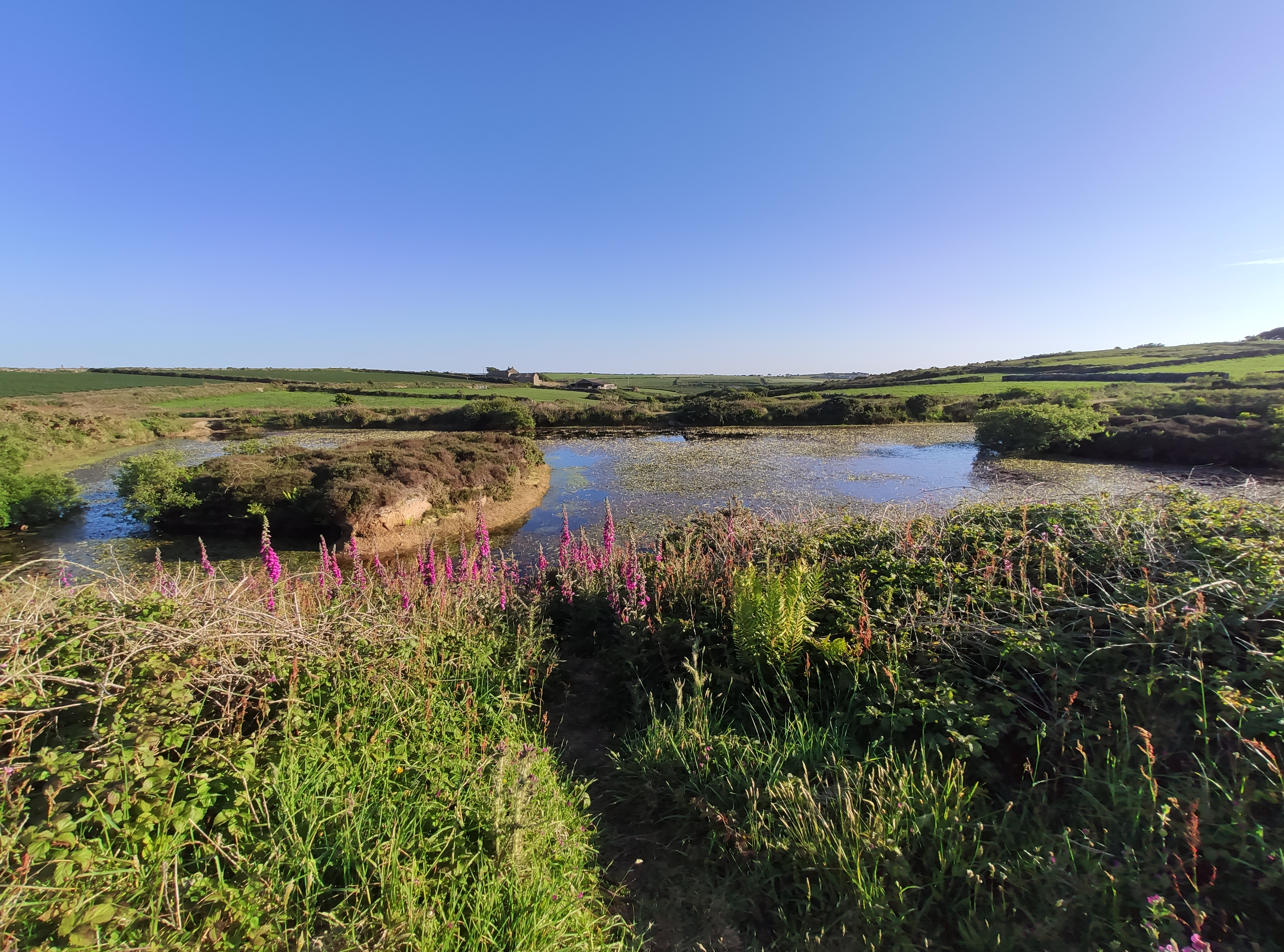
Botallack Common Lake in Cornwall

== Geography ==
The village is in a former tin mining area between the town of St Just in Penwith and the village of Pendeen. The Botallack Mine, former tin mines, are low down the cliffs north of Botallack.

== Notable residents ==
- Roger Hilton (1911–1975), an abstract artist and winner of the Orpen prize while studying at the Slade School of Fine Art in 1930.
- Rose Hilton (1931–2019), a Post-Impressionist painter, who moved to Botallack in 1965 and had a solo show at Newlyn Art Gallery in 1977 and a retrospective exhibition at Tate St Ives in 2008.
