= Calenick =

Hamlet in Cornwall, England

Coordinates: 50.2475°N 5.0578°W

Calenick: Cornish: Klunyek
- Hamlet
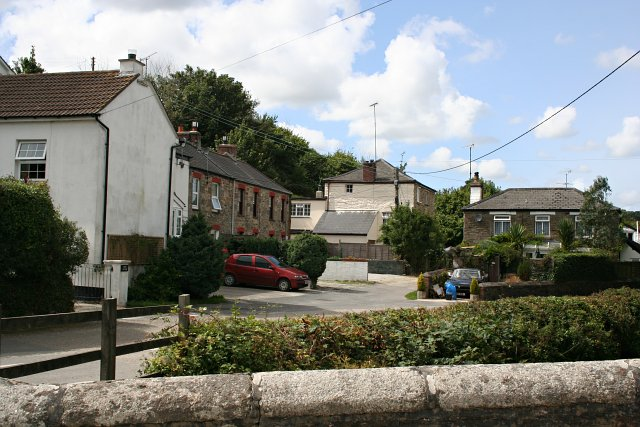

- Location within Cornwall
- Unitary authority: Cornwall
- Region: South West
- Country: England
- Sovereign state: United Kingdom
- Police: Devon and Cornwall
- Fire: Cornwall
- Ambulance: South Western

Calenick (Cornish: Klunyek) is a hamlet in the civil parish of Kea, about a mile south of Truro in Cornwall, England, UK. It is at the head of Calenick Creek, which opens into the River Truro near Sunny Corner.

Calenick is also the name of a grade II* listed house and estate Calenick House.

Circa 1702 The Newham Works opened (and were technically the first incarnation of Calenick, employing the first reverberatory furnace technology in Cornwall’s tin smelting industry). Smelting houses were sited close to coinage towns (Truro, before 1838 when coinage was abolished), with access to estuaries or the coast allowing for efficient import of coal and bricks. They required a source of water-power (waterwheels) to run the stamps used to crush the slag for re-smelting.

Small ‘Calenick Crucibles‘ were manufactured in order to ‘assay’ or test the quantity of metal within the crushed ore. The crucibles resembled small china plant pots and were sold in nests like Russian dolls, exported as far as Australia and to other burgeoning tin mining economies. For this reason, Calenick House was once an important part of Cornwall's Tin Mining industry for both smelting and the manufacture of

Higher Calenick Farm Butchery was located at Higher Calenick Farm between 1992 and 2015.

Calenick Crucibles. Further historical information can be found on Kea Parish Council's history pages as well as the history pages of Calenick House's own website.
