= SS Hayle =

SS Hayle is the name of the following ships:

- SS Hayle (1867), sank in 1918 after a collision
- SS Hayle (1893), built by John Harvey

== See also ==
- Hayle
