= List of shipwrecks in May 1865 =

The list of shipwrecks in May 1865 includes ships sunk, foundered, grounded, or otherwise lost during May 1865.

== 1 May ==
List of shipwrecks: 1 May 1865
Ship	State	Description
Fanny Taylor	United Kingdom	The schooner collided with Harmonides (United Kingdom) and sank off South Stack, Anglesey. Her crew were rescued.
Mary Jane	United Kingdom	The ship was wrecked. A message in a bottle washed up at Great Yarmouth, Norfolk on 7 May 1867 giving the news.
Zoe	United Kingdom	The ship was taken in to the Isles of Scilly in a derelict condition. She was on a voyage from "Camillos" to Antwerp, Belgium.

== 2 May ==
List of shipwrecks: 2 May 1865
Ship	State	Description
Æolus	United Kingdom	The whaler was run ashore at West Horn Point, Iceland. Her 60 crew survived. She was on a voyage from Greenland to Hull, Yorkshire.
John Munro	United Kingdom	The ship ran aground near Lymington, Hampshire. She was on a voyage from Cardiff, Glamorgan to Southampton, Hampshire.

== 3 May ==
List of shipwrecks: 3 May 1865
Ship	State	Description
Nuovo	Spain	The ship was wrecked on the Newgate Sands, in the North Sea off the coast of Pembrokeshire, United Kingdom. Her crew were rescued She was on a voyage from Limerick to Cardiff, Glamorgan, United Kingdom.
Wide-Awake	United Kingdom	The ship was wrecked on Cape North, Nova Scotia, British North America. Her crew were rescued. She was on a voyage from Liverpool, Lancashire to Quebec City, Province of Canada, British North America.

== 4 May ==
List of shipwrecks: 4 May 1865
Ship	State	Description
Success	Flag unknown	The 287-ton barque was wrecked south of Nelson, New Zealand while en route from Newcastle, New South Wales to Wellington, New Zealand.

== 5 May ==
List of shipwrecks: 5 May 1865
Ship	State	Description
HMS Gibraltar	Royal Navy	The Duncan-class ship of the line was driven ashore in the Mediterranean Sea. Subsequently refloated, repaired and returned to service.
Golden Rule	United States	The 2,267-ton sidewheel paddle steamer was stranded on Roncador Reef in the Caribbean Sea off the coast of Nicaragua with 635 passengers on board. They were rescued a week later.
Pomerania	Stralsund	The steamship was driven ashore near Malmö, Sweden. She was on a voyage from Malmö to Stralsund.

== 6 May ==
List of shipwrecks: 6 May 1865
Ship	State	Description
Hypatia	United Kingdom	The ship ran aground in the Hooghly River. She was refloated.
Kennington	United Kingdom	The full-rigged ship ran aground in the Hooghly River. She was refloated.

== 7 May ==
List of shipwrecks: 7 May 1865
Ship	State	Description
Maple Leaf	United Kingdom	The ship was driven ashore on Saaremaa, Russia. She was refloated.
Sylph	United States	The steamer ran ashore on the Savannah River in Georgia upstream of Fort Pulaski.
Three Sisters	United Kingdom	The ship was driven ashore and wrecked at Lemvig, Denmark. She was on a voyage from Liverpool, Lancashire to Memel, Prussia.

== 8 May ==
List of shipwrecks: 8 May 1865
Ship	State	Description
USS Glasgow	United States Navy	The sidewheel gunboat struck a submerged obstruction and sank in Mobile Bay off Mobile, Alabama. She was refloated on 19 June 1865 and returned to service on 1 July 1866.
Hattie	United Kingdom	The 284-gross register ton sidewheel paddle steamer was lost in the Atlantic Ocean.
Hemisphere Borealis	United Kingdom	The ship sprang a leak and was beached in the Aran Islands, County Galway. She was on a voyage from Newport Pratt, County Mayo to Penarth, Glamorgan. She was refloated on 13 May and take in to Galway for repairs.
May	United Kingdom	The 97-ton schooner, carrying china clay from Par, Cornwall to Runcorn, Cheshire, struck the Runnel Stone and sank. Her crew survived. She subsequently refloated and came ashore at Cape Cornwall, Cornwall.

== 9 May ==
List of shipwrecks: 9 May 1865
Ship	State	Description
Inez Lee	United Kingdom	The ship ran aground on the West Rocks, in the North Sea off the coast of Essex. She was refloated and resumed her voyage.
Rubens	United Kingdom	The full-rigged ship was wrecked at the mouth of the Salt River. Her crew were rescued. She was on a voyage from Liverpool, Lancashire to Cape Town, Cape Colony.

== 10 May ==
List of shipwrecks: 10 May 1865
Ship	State	Description
Dahlia	United Kingdom	The barque ran aground on the Pickles Reef. She was on a voyage from Savannah-la-Mar, Jamaica to London. She was a total loss.
Galeed	United Kingdom	The ship struck the Runnel Stone and sank.
Maria Soames	United Kingdom	The barque was wrecked at Whitby, Yorkshire. Her nineteen crew were rescued by the Whitby Lifeboat. She was on a voyage from Sunderland, County Durham to Alexandria, Egypt.
Tonderghie	United Kingdom	The wherry, carrying quicklime, struck a rock in Whithorn Bay, caught fire and sank. She was on a voyage from Workington, Cumberland to the Isle of Whithorn, Lancashire.

== 12 May ==
List of shipwrecks: 12 May 1865
Ship	State	Description
Abeona or Adeona	(United Kingdom of Great Britain and Ireland) New South Wales	The schooner grounded on a spit at the mouth of New Zealand's Whanganui River and could not be refloated.
Fiery Star	United Kingdom	The disabled clipper sank in the Pacific Ocean about 25 nautical miles (46 km) off the coast of New Zealand in the vicinity of 37°05′S 175°42′E, due to damage caused by a fire on board that had been discovered on 19 April during a storm and had never been put out. The barque Dauntless (Flag unknown) rescued the eighteen people remaining aboard Fiery Star. Another 87 people who had abandoned Fiery Star in four lifeboats on 20 April disappeared without trace.
Malakoff	United Kingdom	The ship was wrecked on Cape Sable Island, Nova Scotia, British North America. Her crew were rescued by a fishing boat. She was on a voyage from Liverpool, Lancashire to Halifax, Nova Scotia.
Murray	(United Kingdom of Great Britain and Ireland) South Australia	The pilot boat, a schooner was driven ashore in Wallaroo Bay. She was consequently condemned.
Oak	(United Kingdom of Great Britain and Ireland) New Zealand	The 120-ton brigantine was the first of several ships wrecked during a three-day gale at Hokitika. She arrived at the town from Invercargill, but was caught by a fierce current and driven ashore, where she was pummeled by a storm surge. All passengers and crew survived, but several of the livestock that were being transported were lost.

== 13 May ==
List of shipwrecks: 13 May 1865
Ship	State	Description
E. O. Stanard	United States	Carrying stores for an expedition by Brigadier General Alfred Sully (Union Army), the 281-ton sidewheel paddle steamer struck a snag and sank in the Missouri River at De Soto Bend.

== 14 May ==
List of shipwrecks: 14 May 1865
Ship	State	Description
Amazon	United States	The lumber schooner ran aground on the coast of California at the entrance to San Francisco Bay at Cliff House.
Gannet	(United Kingdom of Great Britain and Ireland) New Zealand	The 27-top cutter (or sloop), carrying timber from Picton was driven ashore by a heavy sea during a gale at Hokitika.
Glasgow	(United Kingdom of Great Britain and Ireland) New Zealand	The 47-ton schooner was buffeted by a heavy sea during a gale, losing her rudder and anchor cable. She was carried onto a beach to the south of the mouth of the Hokitika River.

== 15 May ==
List of shipwrecks: 15 May 1865
Ship	State	Description
Minnehaha	United States	The 531-ton sdewheel paddle steamer burned at New Orleans, Louisiana.
Unnamed	France	The ship was wrecked on Boa Vista, Cape Verde Islands with the loss of all hands. She was on a voyage from Antwerp, Belgium to the River Plate.

== 16 May ==
List of shipwrecks: 16 May 1865
Ship	State	Description
Choice	(United Kingdom of Great Britain and Ireland) Victoria	The 162-ton brigantine was wrecked at New Plymouth, New Zealand, when she dragged her anchors and went onshore during a heavy gale.
Ellen Jenkins, or Helen Jenkinson	United Kingdom	The brigantine foundered 15 nautical miles (28 km) west of Bardsey Island, Pembrokeshire. Her crew were rescued. She was on a voyage from Liverpool, Lancashire to Ostend, West Flanders, Belgium.
Mary	United Kingdom	The brigantine foundered off Holyhead, Anglesey. Her crew were rescued. She was on a voyage from the River Duddon to Briton Ferry, Glamorgan.
Unnamed	Denmark	The East Indiaman capsized and sank at South Shields, County Durham, United Kingdom.

== 17 May ==
List of shipwrecks: 17 May 1865
Ship	State	Description
Alacrity	United Kingdom	The barque was driven ashore and wrecked in Table Bay.
Alma	United Kingdom	The ship was severely damaged in Table Bay.
Athens	United Kingdom	The steamship was wrecked at the Cape of Good Hope, Cape Colony with the loss of 28 of her 45 crew. She was on a voyage from Cape Town, Cape Colony to Mauritius.
Benjamin Miller	United Kingdom	The cutter was driven ashore and wrecked in Table Bay.
Brabner	United Kingdom	The barque was driven ashore and wrecked in Table Bay.
Carstens	United Kingdom	The schooner was driven ashore and wrecked in Table Bay.
City of Peterborough	United Kingdom	The barque was driven ashore and wrecked in Table Bay with the loss of all seventeen people on board.
Closter	Denmark	The schooner was driven ashore and wrecked in Table Bay.
Dane	(United Kingdom of Great Britain and Ireland) Cape Colony	The steamship was severely damaged in Table Bay.
Dart	United Kingdom	The ship was driven ashore 4 nautical miles (7.4 km) south of Bridlington, Yorkshire. She was on a voyage from Newcastle upon Tyne, Northumberland to London.
Galatea	United Kingdom	The brig was driven ashore and damaged in Table Bay. She was refloated.
Gem	United Kingdom	The cutter was driven ashore and wrecked in Table Bay.
Giles	United Kingdom	The schooner was driven ashore and wrecked in Table Bay.
Glendenny	United Kingdom	The barque was driven ashore and wrecked in Table Bay.
Isabel	United Kingdom	The schooner was driven ashore and wrecked in Table Bay.
Jane	United Kingdom	The brig was driven ashore and damaged in Table Bay. She was refloated.
Kehrwieder	Flag unknown	The schooner was driven ashore and wrecked in Table Bay.
Maria Johanna	Netherlands	The brig was driven ashore and wrecked in Table Bay.
Primauguet	French Navy	The Phlégéton-class corvette was driven ashore in Simon's Bay. She was refloated with assistance from HMS Valorous (Royal Navy).
Royal Arthur	United Kingdom	The barque was driven ashore and wrecked in Table Bay. She was on a voyage from Mauritius to London.
Royal Minstrel	United Kingdom	The barque was driven ashore in Table Bay. She was refloated.
Rutland	United Kingdom	The ship was damaged by fire at Liverpool, Lancashire.
Star of the West	United Kingdom	The barque was driven ashore in Table Bay. She was refloated.
Tanjore	France	The full-rigged ship was severely damaged by fire at Marseille, Bouches-du-Rhône.

== 18 May ==
List of shipwrecks: 18 May 1865
Ship	State	Description
Palinurus	(United Kingdom of Great Britain and Ireland) New Zealand	The coal-laden ketch was wrecked at Sumner when the wind dropped suddenly while she was crossing a sandbar.

== 19 May ==
List of shipwrecks: 19 May 1865
Ship	State	Description
Burd Levi	United States	The 205-ton sternwheel paddle steamer exploded on the Ohio River at West Franklin, Indiana, killing five people.
Childers	United Kingdom	The ship was wrecked at Foochow, China.
Ocean Queen	United Kingdom	The barque foundered in the Atlantic Ocean 14 nautical miles (26 km) west north west of the Isles of Scilly. Her eighteen crew were rescued by the barque Hygeia (United Kingdom). Ocean Queen was on a voyage from Newport, Monmouthshire to Halifax, Nova Scotia, British North America.
Wanderer	United Kingdom	The ship was destroyed by fire at Mogador, Morocco.

== 20 May ==
List of shipwrecks: 20 May 1865
Ship	State	Description
City of Dunedin	(United Kingdom of Great Britain and Ireland) New Zealand	The 327-ton paddle steamer left Wellington for Nelson on 20 May. Cook Strait at the time had a heavy swell, and it is thought she may have been cast onto rocks near Cape Terawhiti. Wreckage was found later in the month. Approximately 40 crew and passengers were lost.
Ellora	United Kingdom	The ship sank at Bombay, India. She was on a voyage from Bombay to Liverpool, Lancashire.
Wakool	(United Kingdom of Great Britain and Ireland) New Zealand	The 46-ton steamer was driven ashore by a gale north of the mouth of the Hokitika River, and as a result broke amidships.

== 21 May ==
List of shipwrecks: 21 May 1865
Ship	State	Description
Ellen	United Kingdom	The schooner ran aground on the Droogden, in the Baltic Sea. She was on a voyage from Neustadt in Holstein, Duchy of Holstein to Leith, Lothian.
Illustrious	United Kingdom	The ship was wrecked on St, Paul Island, Nova Scotia, British North America. She was on a voyage from Algiers, Algeria to Quebec City, Province of Canada, British North America.
Julia	United States	Carrying a cargo of corn for an expedition by Brigadier General Alfred Sully, the steamer sank in the Missouri River about 10 nautical miles (19 km) downstream of Sioux City, Iowa.
Orion	United Kingdom	The barque sprang a leak and foundered 2 nautical miles (3.7 km) north west of the Wolf Rock, Cornwall. Her eleven crew were rescued by the schooner Cameleon (United Kingdom). Orion was on a voyage from Plymouth, Devon to Veracruz, Mexico.

== 22 May ==
List of shipwrecks: 22 May 1865
Ship	State	Description
Ellora	United Kingdom	The ship foundered off Bombay, India. Her crew were rescued.

== 23 May ==
List of shipwrecks: 23 May 1865
Ship	State	Description
Frederika	Sweden	The ship departed from Newcastle upon Tyne, Northumberland, United Kingdom for Norrköpng. No further trace, presumed foundered with the loss of all hands.

== 24 May ==
List of shipwrecks: 24 May 1865
Ship	State	Description
Alliance	(United Kingdom of Great Britain and Ireland) New Zealand	The 73-ton schooner was beached to the north of the mouth of the Waikato River when her sails were blown to shreds by a heavy gale.
Delaware	United States	The 616- or 650-ton sidewheel paddle steamer was lost on the St. Johns River on the coast of Florida inside St. Johns Bar.
Denbigh	United Kingdom	American Civil War, Union blockade: Pursued by the armed sidewheel paddle steamers USS Cornubia and USS Fort Jackson and the armed screw steamer USS Princess Royal (all United States Navy) while trying to run the Union blockade during a voyage from Havana, Cuba, to Galveston, Texas, the 250-gross register ton sidewheel paddle steamer ran aground on the coast of Texas on Bird Key Spit near Bolivar Point. United States Navy warships shelled and wrecked her. A boarding party from the gunboat USS Kennebec and the sloop-of-war USS Seminole (both United States Navy) burned her on 25 May, making her the last blockade runner destroyed during the American Civil War.
Euphemia	United Kingdom	The schooner ran aground and sank in the River Ouse. She was on a voyage from the Clyde to Lewes, Sussex.
George Olympus	United Kingdom	The steamship sprang a leak and foundered in the Atlantic Ocean 70 nautical miles (130 km) east south east of Sandy Hook, New Jersey, United States. Her crew were rescued by a pilot boat. She was on a voyage from New York, United States to London.
Lecompt	Confederate States of America	American Civil War, Union blockade: Pursued by the sidewheel paddle steamer USS Cornubia (United States Navy), the schooner ran aground on the coast of Texas at Bird Key Spit in Galveston Bay. She was set afire by Union forces and became a wreck on Bolivar Point Beach.

== 25 May ==
List of shipwrecks: 25 May 1865
Ship	State	Description
Colonel Cowles	United States	American Civil War: The full-rigged ship was destroyed in port at Mobile, Alabama, when a nearby captured Confederate warehouse filled with ammunition exploded.
Fusilier	United Kingdom	The full-rigged ship was wrecked on the Bluff Rocks, on the coast of the Colony of Natal with the loss of twenty lives. She was on a voyage from London to Melbourne, Victoria.
HMS Herring	Royal Navy	The Albacore-class gunboat ran aground at Mickery Island, in the Firth of Forth. She was on a voyage from Leith, Lothian to North Queensferry, Fife. She was later refloated, but was consequently broken up at Sheerness, Kent.
Kate Dale	United States	American Civil War: The 428-bulk ton sidewheel paddle steamer was set afire and destroyed in port at Mobile, when a nearby captured Confederate warehouse filled with ammunition exploded.
Nemesis	United Kingdom	The steamship ran aground on the Rinfuhah Shoal.

== 26 May ==
List of shipwrecks: 26 May 1865
Ship	State	Description
Esmeralda	Argentina	The steamship ran aground at San Fernando de Buena Vista. She was on a voyage from Buenos Aires to Rosario.
CSS Viper	Confederate States Navy	American Civil War: Captured by Union Army forces in April, the torpedo boat was under tow from Appalachicola, Florida, to Key West, Florida, by the screw steamer USS Yucca (United States Navy) when she sprang a leak during a storm and sank in the Gulf of Mexico. A United States Navy prize crew aboard her was removed safely before she sank.
Warrior	United Kingdom	The ship collided with the barque Tropique (France) and sank in the English Channel off The Lizard, Cornwall. Her crew were rescued by Tropique. Warrior was on a voyage from Naguabo, Puerto Rico to London.
Unnamed	Kingdom of Hanover	The schooner was wrecked on Inchkeith, Fife, United Kingdom.

== 28 May ==
List of shipwrecks: 28 May 1865
Ship	State	Description
Abigail	United States	American Civil War: The whaler, a barque, was burned near the Shantar Islands in the northwestern Sea of Okhotsk at 57°07′N 153°01′E by the merchant raider CSS Shenandoah (Confederate States Navy). Shenandoah had captured Abigail on 27 May.
Anne	United Kingdom	The ship collided with an Austrian vessel and in the Mediterranean Sea off Cape de Gatt, Spain. She consequently foundered on the next day.
Pilot	(United Kingdom of Great Britain and Ireland) New Zealand	The cutter broke up on a sandspit at the mouth of West Wanganui Inlet (possibly Whanganui Inlet on the South Island's West Coast).
Sir R. Abercrombie	United Kingdom	The ship was abandoned off the Agulpha Bank, in the Indian Ocean. She was on a voyage from Madras, India to London.
Sybil	United Kingdom	The ship departed from Middlesbrough, Yorkshire for Riga, Russia. No further trace, presumed foundered with the loss of all hands.

== 29 May ==
List of shipwrecks: 29 May 1865
Ship	State	Description
Annie	United Kingdom	The barque collided with another vessel and sank in the Bay of Biscay. Her crew were rescued.
Governor Troup	United States	Carrying over 200 passenger and crew and a cargo of cotton, the 155-ton sidewheel paddle steamer ran into the South Carolina bank of the Savannah River below Augusta, Georgia, killing 40 people.
Leveret	United Kingdom	The ship was driven ashore at Hook of Holland, South Holland, Netherlands. She had been refloated by 8 June.
Robert and Lizzie	United Kingdom	The ship sank off Falster, Denmark. Her crew survived.

== 30 May ==
List of shipwrecks: 30 May 1865
Ship	State	Description
Agnes and Mary	United Kingdom	The smack was driven ashore at Groomsport, County Down.
Inca	France	The brig was wrecked on Tinos, Greece. Her crew were rescued. She was on a voyage from Marseille, Bouches-du-Rhône to Taganrog, Russia.
Johannes Hincke	Sweden	The ship was driven ashore north of Marstrand.
Wave	United Kingdom	The yacht was wrecked at Hartlepool, County Durham. Her five crew were rescued.

== 31 May ==
List of shipwrecks: 31 May 1865
Ship	State	Description
Anna	Stettin	The ship was driven ashore at Halmstad, Sweden. She was on a voyage from Newcastle upon Tyne, Northumberland, United Kingdom to Stettin.
Felix	Sweden	The brig ran aground off Skagen, Denmark. She was refloated and taken in tow by Portia (United Kingdom). Felix was on a voyage from Shoreham-by-Sea, Sussex, United Kingdom to Gothenburg.
Northern Chief	United States	The fishing schooner collided with the steamship Bosphorus (United Kingdom) and sank at Boston, Massachusetts, or off Cape Sable Island. 5 crewmen scrambled aboard Bosphorus before the ship sank. Her Captain and 5 crewmen drowned.
Pickering	United Kingdom	The brigantine collided with the schooner Cornwall (United Kingdom) and sank. Her crew were rescued. She was on a voyage from Newcastle upon Tyne to London.
Rosa	(United Kingdom of Great Britain and Ireland) Guernsey	The barque ran aground on the Newcombe Sand, in the North Sea off the coast of Suffolk. She was on a voyage from South Shields, County Durham to Guernsey. She was refloated and taken in to Lowestoft, Suffolk in a leaky condition.
Volta	United Kingdom	The barque was driven ashore at "Stubben", Denmark. She was on a voyage from Newcastle upon Tyne to Saint Petersburg, Russia. She was refloated on 2 June and taken in to Copenhagen, Denmark for repairs.

== Unknown date ==
List of shipwrecks: Unknown date in May 1865
Ship	State	Description
Alibi	United Kingdom	The barque ran aground on the Carysfort Reef on or before 11 May. She was on a voyage from Cardiff, Glamorgan to Cienfuegos, Cuba.
Angela Burdett Coutts	United Kingdom	The ship was wrecked near Masulipatam, India before 13 May.
Anglo-Saxon	United Kingdom	The ship was driven ashore at "Point Leir", British North America before 27 May.
Argentinus	United Kingdom	The ship was sunk by ice before 27 May. Her crew were rescued. She was on a voyage from Hull, Yorkshire to Quebec City, Province of Canada, British North America.
Blue Bell	(United Kingdom of Great Britain and Ireland) New Zealand	The ketch left Hokitika for Greymouth sometime in May, and was not seen again. She may have capsized in a gale. She had a crew of four.
Brothers	United Kingdom	The ship sprang a leak off Skerries, County Dublin and was abandoned. Her crew were rescued by the steamship Lady Eglington (United Kingdom). Brothers was on a voyage from Liverpool, Lancashire to Marseille, Bouches-du-Rhône, France.
Cairngorm	United Kingdom	The ship ran aground in the Saint Lawrence River at Kamouraska, Province of Canada. She was on a voyage from Ardrossan, Ayrshire to Quebec City. She was refloated on 8 May.
Cora II	United States	Carrying a cargo of stores and ordnance for an expedition by brigadier General Alfred Sully, the 215-ton sternwheel paddle steamer sank in the Missouri River near De Soto and Fort Calhoun, Nebraska Territory on 1 or 4 May.
Corsair	(United Kingdom of Great Britain and Ireland) South Australia	The pilot boat foundered at Adelaide with the loss of four of her five crew.
Dolly	Confederate States of America	American Civil War: After being seized by Union forces in May 1863 at Edwards Ferry, North Carolina, the steamer was sunk in a canal along with a lighter carrying a cargo of iron plates. The sinking of both vessels was reported on 27 May.
Eagle	Flag unknown	The schooner was stranded on the coast of California at Russian Gulch during a gale.
Edith	United Kingdom	The ship was wrecked. She was on a voyage from Genoa, Italy to Alexandria, Egypt.
Esperanza	Spain	The ship was wrecked near Ribadesella. She was on a voyage from Ribadeo to Swansea, Glamorgan.
Eugenie	Italy	The full-rigged ship was driven ashore in Tangier Bay. She was on a voyage from Newcastle upon Tyne, Northumberland, United Kingdom to Castello a Mare, Sicily.
George	United Kingdom	The ship was wrecked near "Cintra" before 21 May. She was on a voyage from Newport, Monmouthshire to Pará, Brazil.
Hope	United Kingdom	The ship was abandoned in the Atlantic Ocean before 12 May. her crew were rescued. She was on a voyage from Limerick to Quebec City.
Independence	United Kingdom	The ship was driven ashore at Arichat, Nova Scotia. She was on a voyage from Buctouche, New Brunswick, British North America to Liverpool. She was later refloated.
Kate	United Kingdom	The 245-ton brig was wrecked near New Plymouth, New Zealand. She was becalmed and driven on shore by a heavy swell.
Kate	United States	The ship was wrecked on Old Providence Island, United States of Colombia. She was on a voyage from New York to Puerto Rico.
Kate Williams	(United Kingdom of Great Britain and Ireland) New Zealand	The schooner left Hicks Bay for Auckland early in May, and was either wrecked on the coast or foundered at sea.
Mars	United States	The 55-ton sidewheel paddle steamer struck a snag and sank in the Missouri River at Coughlan's Landing across from the mouth of the Fishing River.
Mary Pring	United Kingdom	The ship was driven ashore at Korsør, Denmark. She was refloated and taken in to Kiel, Prussia, where she arrived on 22 May.
Mercury	United States	The 184-ton sternwheel paddle steamer was beached and sank in the Mississippi River at Harrison's Landing downstream of St. Louis, Missouri, after colliding with Hard Times (United States).
Pliny F. Barton	United States	The 40-ton screw steamer burned on the St. Clair River in Michigan.
Two Brothers	United Kingdom	The ship was abandoned off the Tuskar Rock before 9 May. She was on a voyage from Ardrossan, Ayrshire to Marseille, Bouches-du-Rhône, France.
