= SS Ramleh (1891) =

Largest vessel ever to be built in Cornwall, England

- Ramleh docked in an undated photograph

History

United Kingdom
- Name: Ramleh
- Namesake: Ramleh
- Owner: W. Wheatley & Co
- Ordered: 1891
- Builder: Harvey & Co., Hayle
- Yard number: 151
- Launched: 6 June 1891
- Acquired: Christian Salvesen (1904), Petersen & Co. (1917)
- In service: 1891–1918
- Out of service: 18 September 1918
- Identification: UK official number 97888; Code letters MGSD
- Fate: Beached after collision with Danish steamer Nordamerika 62 miles north of Ténès, Algeria, 18 September 1918

General characteristics
- Type: Cargo ship
- Tonnage: 2,663 GRT
- Length: 89.6 m (294 ft)
- Beam: 12.2 m (40 ft)
- Depth: 5.9 m (19 ft)
- Installed power: 1 × triple-expansion steam engine by Harvey & Co., Hayle; 260 NHP
- Propulsion: 1 × screw propeller (single shaft)
- Speed: 10.5 kn (12.1 mph; 19.4 km/h)

SS Ramleh was a British steam-powered cargo ship. Built in 1891 by Harvey & Co in Hayle, England, she was the largest vessel ever to be built in Cornwall.

== Construction ==
Ramleh was originally ordered by Liverpool-based shipping company W. Wheatley & Co, and was built by Harvey & Co, a shipping company based in Hayle. 89.6 meters (294 ft) long and 12.2 meters (40 ft) wide, she was and remains the largest vessel ever to be constructed in Cornwall. Ramleh was launched on 6 June 1891 and entered service for use in the India and China trade.

== Career ==
Ramleh remained under the ownership of W. Wheatley & Co from 1891 to 1904, when she was purchased by whaling company Christian Salvesen and repurposed for whaling. She was used for this purpose until 1917, when she was purchased by Petersen & Co and operated as a cargo ship.

=== Loss ===
On 18 September 1918, Ramleh was travelling from the River Tyne to Genoa with a cargo of brick, steel and coal. However, she collided with Danish steamer Nordamerika 62 miles north of Tenes, Algeria and was subsequently beached half a mile west of Tenes Harbour as a total loss. Her wreck remains six to eight meters down.

== See also ==
- Hayle
- Christian Salvesen
- John Harvey (ironfounder)
