= Hayle Power Station =

- Official name: Hayle Power Station
- Country: England
- Location: Cornwall, South West England
- Coordinates: 50.1922°N 5.4297°W
- Commission date: 1910
- Decommission date: 1973
- Operator: Cornwall Electric Power Company

Thermal power station
- Primary fuel: Coal

Hayle Power Station was a coal-fired power station situated at the mouth of the River Hayle, at Hayle in Cornwall, South West England.

== History ==
On 13 March 1910, Harvey & Co of Hayle signed an agreement with the Cornwall Electric Power Company, for them to build a power station on land owned by Harveys. Stage 1 of the station's construction was completed by Carkeeks of Redruth. It began on 7 May 1910, and was completed thirty weeks later on 12 December 1910 and generation began.

Initially the station used a single 900 kilowatt (kW) Belliss and Morcom (B&M) steam turbine, supplied with steam by two Babcock & Wilcox boilers. This powered a Dick, Kerr & Co. alternator. In 1911 a 500 kW (B&M) was added, to use steam from the first turbine. This powered a Lancashire Dynamo alternator. Another two identical generating sets were added between 1912 and 1913. Between 1914 and 1916, two 3,000 kW Richardsons Westgarth & Company, each supplied with steam by two Babcock & Wilcox boilers. This brought the station's generating capacity to 8,800 kW.

In 1928 a 7,500 kW British Thomson-Houston (BTH) turbo-alternator was added, supplied with steam from the Babcock & Wilcox boilers. In 1929, a 500 kW Parsons turbo alternator was moved to the station from Carn Brea Power Station, along with a Babcock & Wilcox boiler, but they were never satisfactory and were removed by 1935.

In 1932, a 10,000 kW English Electric turbo-alternator was added, provided for by a Sterling boiler. In 1933 the station was connected to the National Grid, so electricity could be imported or exported by the company. A 300 kW English Electric turbo alternator was installed in 1935, primarily for pumping circulatory water around the station in case of a shut down. By this time the station's nameplate generating capacity was 36,600 kW, but in 1936, the first six generating units were put up for sale as scrap, bringing the capacity down to 27,800 kW.

In 1938, Imperial Chemical Industries built the British Ethyl Works near to the power station, and the station provided it directly with electricity at 11 kilovolts. The works also used the station's waste hot water. Associated Octel took over using the station's water in 1948. In December 1938, heavy snow fell on England and for the first time the station was required to operate at maximum capacity.

In 1939, a 15,000 kW English Electric turbo alternator was added, provided with steam by a Sterling boiler. However this created problems with high water temperature and cooling problems on low tides, and so a dam was built near the station.

In 1947, another 15,000 kW English Electric turbo alternator was added, provided with steam by two Sterling boilers. In 1949, a 20,000 kW English Electric turbo alternator was added, with a Yarrow boiler. In 1959, another 20,000 kW turbo alternator was added, this time provided by BTH, as well as another Yarrow boiler. This brought the station's generating capacity to its highest, at over 70,000 kW.

In 1972, some of the station's older generating sets were taken out of service, the installed capacity was reduced to 66.3 MW. In September 1973, Associated Octel closed and ceased to take the station's hot water. This, combined with large, modern stations taking base load, led to the station rarely being called upon to generate, and it closed by the end of the year.

The high pressure boiler plant comprised two Stirling boilers each 100,000 pounds per hour, two Yarrow boilers each 200,000 lb/hr these had a working pressure of 425 psi and 825 °F (29.3 bar, 441 °C). The low pressure plant comprised two Babcock & Wilcox 50,000 lb/hr boilers, one Babcock & Wilcox 60,000 lb/hr boiler, and two Stirling 100,000 lb/hr boilers; these operated at 250 psi and 730 °F (17.2 bar, 388 °C)(one at 825 °F, 441 °C).

The capacity and electricity output of the station was as follows.

Hayle generating capacity and electricity supplied
Year	Capacity MW	Output GWh
1954	64	254.659
1955	64	246.119
1956	64	226.847
1957	64	214.959
1958	64	185.554
1961	83	136.175
1962	83	60.456
1963	83	139.893
1967	83	159.003
1971	43	70.206

The station's two chimneys were demolished in June 1981. The station's turbine hall and boiler room were demolished the following December. To fit with an agreement made before the station's construction, the site was cleared following demolition.
