= Orkney and Shetland Islands Telegraph Company =

The Orkney and Shetland Islands Telegraph Company provided telegraph services between Caithness, Orkney and Shetland from 1870 until 1876.

== History ==
The Orkney & Shetland Islands Telegraph Company was promoted by George Hay of Laxfirth, Shetland in 1868. The directors were Robert Baikie of Tankerness, David Balfour of Balfour, Orkney and Alexander Bain, Provost of Kirkwall.

The company raised capital of £20,000 and Henley and Reid Brothers were employed to lay a series of undersea cables and land lines from Wick to Orkney via the Pentland Firth, and then to Boddam, Shetland. On Shetland, connections were established as far as Baltasound on Unst by April, the farthest north that telegraph communications reached in Britain.

Cable laying started in September 1869. The SS Hayle of Aberdeen was engaged as a cable laying vessel. The initial works involved submerging a cable from Brough, Caithness and a bay near Melsetter House in Walls. Having completed this, the steamer went to Sanday, landed the shore-end at Start Point and layed out two miles of cable, which was then cut and buoyed. The steamer then proceeded to Shetland, landed a cable at Sumburgh Head and proceeded to Orkney. Within 2 days, the whole cable was safely submerged. The remaining part from hoy to the mainland was submerged last. However, during October 1869 the Orkney end of the cable from Shetland which had been buoyed was lost, as the buoy became detached. The SS Hayle was dispatched to try and locate it. The first section of the telegraph from Wick to Pentland Firth opened on 20 November 1869. However, the steamer was not able to locate the Orkney end of the submerged cable due to storms, so the project was abandoned in December.

The telegraph cable to Shetland was successfully connected in August 1870 and the line from Caithness to Orkney shortly afterwards. Telegraph offices were opened on Orkney at Longhope, Stromness and Kirkwall on Monday 28 August 1870.

In October 1873 the cable broke about 2 miles south of Sumburgh Head and several of the cables in the islands were also damaged. Attempts to repair the cable in January 1874 were hampered by bad weather. The islands were cut off for several months. The SS Caroline was engaged to lay a new cable, and this opened in August 1874. The same ship also laid a new cable in the Pentland Firth, and the damaged cable here was also successfully repaired, which resulted in 2 cables being made available for use between the mainland and Orkney.

The costs of construction resulted in significant charges for messages. When it cost 13s 6d (67½p) (equivalent to £82 in 2023) to send a telegram of twenty words from Shetland compared with 1s (5p) (equivalent to £6 in 2023) from elsewhere in Britain, the struggling company was taken over by the General Post Office on 12 April 1876 at a cost of £37,550 (equivalent to £4,460,000 in 2023). The Post Office reduced the charges payable to the ordinary inland rate of 1s for the first 20 words, and 3d for every additional five works.
