= Rigibore =

Tool manufacturer

- Type: Limited
- Industry: Engineering
- Founded: 1983
- Headquarters: Hayle, Cornwall, United Kingdom
- Key people: Roger Bassett, MD
- Products: Precision boring tools, special tools, high-precision adjustable tools
- Website: www.rigibore.com

Rigibore is a British-American manufacturer of special boring tools based in Hayle, Cornwall, UK, and Mukwonago, Wisconsin, US.

Founded in 1983, Rigibore supplies tools, cartridges, units and inserts, generally for use in CNC machining, as well as developing high-precision tooling solutions. Rigibore won the Institution of Mechanical Engineers Manufacturing Excellence Award for Best SME in 2002 and Best Practice in IT in 2003.

In 2007 the Smartbore product range was launched, which allows fine adjustments to be made to a tool without removing it from a machine spindle.

In 2008 Rigibore launched its ActiveEdge products which utilise a wireless link to allow micrometre-accurate adjustments to be made to tooling.
