= Hayle Academy =

Location
- 3 High Lanes; Hayle, Cornwall, TR27 4DN; England; 50.18469°N 5.410695°W

Information
- Former names: Hayle County Secondary Modern School Hayle Community School
- Type: Academy
- Established: September 1957; 69 years ago
- Local authority: Cornwall
- Trust: Truro & Penwith Academy Trust
- Department for Education URN: 145211 Tables
- Ofsted: Reports
- Head teacher: Melissa Lock
- Gender: Coeducational
- Age range: 11–16
- Enrolment: as of June 2024: 510
- Capacity: 769
- Hours in school day: 6 hours, 20 minutes (8:45–3:05)
- Classrooms: 30 (excluding Towans 1 and Towans 2)
- Houses: Godrevy (blue) Gwithian (yellow) Mexico (red) Bluff (green)
- Feeder schools: Penpol School, Bodriggy Academy
- Website: http://www.hayleacademy.net
- Last updated: 26 June 2024

Hayle Academy (formerly Hayle Community School) is a coeducational secondary school located in Hayle in the English county of Cornwall.

Previously a community school administered by Cornwall Council, in November 2017 Hayle Community School converted to academy status and was renamed Hayle Academy. The school is now sponsored by the Truro & Penwith Academy Trust.

Hayle Academy offers GCSEs and BTECs as programmes of study for students.

== History ==
The school opened as Hayle County Secondary Modern School in September 1957.
