= Boddam, Shetland =

Coordinates: 59.924°N 1.291°W

Boddam
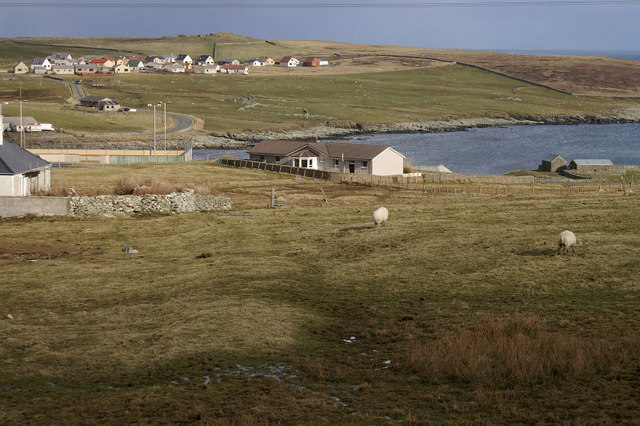
- Boddam, with Dalsetter in the distance

- Location within Shetland
- OS grid reference: HU396155
- Civil parish: Dunrossness
- Council area: Shetland
- Lieutenancy area: Shetland
- Country: Scotland
- Sovereign state: United Kingdom
- Post town: SHETLAND
- Postcode district: ZE2
- Dialling code: 01950
- Police: Scotland
- Fire: Scottish
- Ambulance: Scottish
- UK Parliament: Orkney and Shetland
- Scottish Parliament: Shetland

Boddam (Shaetlan pronunciation: [ˈbɒːdəm] BOD-əm) is a village on the island of Mainland, in Shetland, Scotland.

Boddam is an area of Dunrossness in the South Mainland of Shetland. Although Boddam is just the name for the few houses at the head of the voe, including the slaughterhouse, the nearby estates of Hillock, Dalsetter Wynd, and Turniebrae are also usually referred to as being in Boddam. Boddam has a working Norse horizontal mill and the Croft House Museum.

The sea off Boddam hosts a population of sandeel that provides a food source for many species fish, seabirds, seals, whales and dolphins: the area is considered to have the most reliable population of sandeels of all the seas surrounding Shetland, and is now designated as a Nature Conservation Marine Protected Area (NCMPA).

Boddam was chosen by the Orkney and Shetland Islands Telegraph Company as the landfall for its undersea cable from Orkney which provided telegraphic communication to Shetland for the first time in 1870.
