= Frankie (flamingo) =

Formerly missing flamingo (born 2025)

- Species: Phoenicopterus ruber
- Born: 1 July 2025 (age 14 months); Paradise Park Wildlife Sanctuary, Hayle, Cornwall, United Kingdom
- Nationality: United Kingdom (formerly); France
- Known for: going missing from Cornwall and subsequently being located in Brittany

Frankie (born 1 July 2025) is a Caribbean flamingo who garnered attention in November 2025 when she disappeared from the zoo in Cornwall, England, where she had been born. After a six-day search, Frankie was located in France.

== Early life ==
Frankie was born at Paradise Park Wildlife Sanctuary in Hayle, Cornwall, in on 1 July 2025. Her right wing was clipped shortly after her birth. She was the second flamingo born at the zoo, where she was raised by her parents in a walled garden.

== Disappearance and discovery ==
Between 08:00 and 08:20 GMT on 2 November 2025, Frankie, then aged four months old, disappeared from her enclosure at Paradise Park. While clipped birds cannot take flight, clipping does not prevent them from flying once airborne, with it hypothesised that Frankie may have been "jumping up and down" and "stretching and flapping" her wings when she was caught by a gust of wind.

Following her disappearance, zookeepers alerted the local Cornish media, who asked the public to share any potential sightings, as well as asking for information to be shared on Facebook. The search was complicated by the recent release of a white stork in northern England, with many reports erroneously identifying the stork as Frankie. The only confirmed sighting of Frankie was a photograph taken by a local resident in Porthtowan at around 10:15 towards the Hayle Estuary, leading to concerns she may have been pulled out over the Atlantic Ocean by the air stream.

On 9 November 2025, a French citizen reported seeing a flamingo on Île Aganton, an island off the north coast of France, on 3 November, 120 miles away from Paradise Park, on the Breton coast. A pair of images were subsequently taken of a flamingo at Plage de Keremma in Goulven, around 30 miles away, by Mickaël Belliot of Finistère, which were shared with Paradise Park. She was also seen in Kerlouan on 8 November.

David Woolcock, a curator at Paradise Park, later stated it was "unlikely" Frankie would be returned to the United Kingdom, citing complications with animals crossing the France–United Kingdom border following Brexit, in addition to the heightened risk that Frankie could have contracted bird flu during her travels. He expressed hope that Frankie would a join a flock of wild flamingos, such as at the Parc naturel régional de Camargue in southern France.

On 30 July 2026, a flamingo chick and sibling to Frankie hatched at Paradise Park.
