= Hayle and Bristol Steam Packet Company =

Shipping companies in England (1838–1863)

- Industry: Shipping
- Predecessor: Hayle Steamship Company
- Founded: 1838
- Founder: John Vivian
- Defunct: 1863
- Fate: Liquidated
- Headquarters: Hayle
- Area served: Hayle, Bristol, Ilfracombe

The Hayle and Bristol Steam Packet Company operated steam ship services between Hayle, Ilfracombe and Bristol in the mid nineteenth century. Confusingly from 1848 to 1860, the company name was used by two separate operators.

== History ==
Although a steamer first called at Hayle in 1824, regular weekly services began in 1831, when the Hayle Steamship Company was formed operating with the wooden vessel Herald, under the command of John Vivian.

The engineering company Harvey's of Hayle built the engines for the PS Cornwall of 1842. When the Great Western Railway arrived in Bristol, this stimulated more travel between London and the South West of England, and the PS Cornwall was added to the Hayle service under the command of John Vivian. The extra business attracted a rival when Vivian Stevens of St Ives put his PS Brilliant on to the Hayle to Bristol route.

The Hayle Steamship Company was renamed the Hayle and Bristol Steam Packet Company in 1848, and confusingly Vivian Stevens with the PS Brilliant adopted the same title.

The original Hayle and Bristol Steam Packet Company launched a prospectus in 1857 to attract capital investment. The secretary of the new company was Mr John Vivian of Hayle. The company was launched with nominal capital of £28,750 (equivalent to $2,810,839 in 2025) and working capital of £23,000 (equivalent to $2,471,068 in 2025). The company prospectus announced that a First Class A.1. 12 years Iron Steamer was being built at Hayle, by Harvey and Co, capable of carrying 200 Tons of Cargo, with ample accommodation for passengers. The cost of this new steamer was £18,000 (equivalent to $1,933,879 in 2025), and in 1858, the company launched the Cornubia. The company also planned to sell the Cornwall for £2,000 (equivalent to $214,875 in 2025) when the SS Cornubia was launched.

The additional traffic was short-lived, as the extension of railway services from London and Bristol through into Cornwall was completed when the Royal Albert Bridge was completed and opened on 2 May 1859.

Both Hayle and Bristol Steam Packet Companies amalgamated around 1860, probably as a result of traffic diminishing. The company undertook voluntary liquidation following a meeting of the shareholders on 6 November 1861. Steamer services continued, and attempted competition with screw vessels. Having sold off the SS Cornubia, Harveys built and owned the SS Bride of 1863 and SS Bessie of 1865. However, the two ships could not compete with rail travel for both passengers and freight, and were moved to other trades.

The Hayle to Bristol services reduced and were operated by Hosken, Trevithick, Polkinhorn and Company Ltd of Penzance which bought the screw steamer Norseman in 1893. The Norseman was replaced with the M.J. Hedley, a steam coaster carrying passengers until 1917 on a weekly service linking Bristol, Hayle and Liverpool.
