= SS Hayle (1867) =

History
- Name: Hayle (1867–1891); Luigia C (1891–1898); Ville de Cannes (1898–1907); Providenza (1907–ca.1911); Nuevo Ampurdanés (ca. 1911–1918)
- Operator: Tom Mawr Company of Neath
- Port of registry: (United Kingdom)
- Builder: Harvey and Company, Hayle
- Launched: 10 June 1867
- Out of service: 14 March 1918
- Fate: Sank

General characteristics
- Tonnage: 450 GRT
- Length: 156 ft (48 m)
- Beam: 24.5 ft (7.5 m)
- Depth: 14 ft (4.3 m)
- Installed power: 60 hp (45 kW)
- Speed: 9 knots (17 km/h; 10 mph)

SS Hayle was a steam vessel built by Harvey and Company, Hayle for Tom Mawr Company of Neath in 1867.

== History ==
The Hayle was launched by Miss Husband on 10 July 1867. She was fitted with water ballast filled by a valve in the bottom and emptied by engine pumps which took around 30 minutes. Her hold was divided into three water-tight compartments for cargo.

In December 1868 she was obtained by Messrs Adam & Co., Marischal Street, Aberdeen to carry coal to Aberdeen. This was to overcome difficulties during the winter in the delivery of coal to Aberdeen by sailing vessels which were frequently delayed and which increased the costs of delivery. The company purchased the Hayle and she left London on 24 November 1868 for Sunderland to take up her first consignment which was delivered to Aberdeen successfully. Two more trips were completed which delivered 1,500 tons of coal in the space of 21 days.

In mid 1869 she returned to London and was fitted out for laying telegraphic cables. From August 1869 she was engaged by the Orkney and Shetland Islands Telegraph Company to lay submarine cables between Caithness, Orkney and Shetland. Much of 1870 was taken up with this work between the islands.

On 25 December 1869 during a storm she got stuck on Scroby Sand, but was refloated with the assistance of boatmen.

On 5 October 1882 the ship sustained damage whilst entering the dock gates in Aberdeen Harbour. The owners launched action against the Harbour Commissioners in pursuit of £527 7s 8d (equivalent to £52,500 in 2023) of damages. On 6 December 1885 she was in collision with a vessel assumed to be the Leader of Lossiemouth in the vicinity of Bell Rock. She put into Arbroath Harbour but the damage to the vessel was significant and necessitated its return to Aberdeen for repairs.

On 15 March 1890 whilst sailing from Sunderland to Aberdeen with a cargo of coals, stranded on Bondiear Rocks near Amble. In August 1890, Adam and Co put the steamer up for sale.

A steamer bearing the name Hayle is recorded as departing Liverpool on 13 January 1891 for Aviles, Spain. She was sold to Italian owners Carlo Chiappe of Genoa and named Luigia C.

Later she was sold again to Gustaldi Company and renamed as Ville de Cannes. She collided with the British steamer Island on 19 January 1899 at the entrance to Cannes harbour.

In 1907 she was purchased by Italian owners and briefly named Providenza. By 1913 she was owned by Felix Ribera based in Palamós, Spain and named the Nuevo Ampurdanés. She sank on 14 March 1918 whilst on a voyage from Cette to Barcelona after a collision with another steamer off Mataro.
