= USS Cornubia =

Gunboat of the United States Navy

History
- Name: USS Cornubia
- Builder: Harvey & Co.
- Cost: £18,000 (£2,288,148 in 2023)
- Laid down: November 1856
- Launched: February 1858
- Commissioned: 17 March 1864
- Decommissioned: 9 August 1865 at Philadelphia, Pennsylvania
- Stricken: 1865 (est.)
- Captured: by Union Navy forces, 8 November 1863
- Fate: Sold, 25 October 1865

General characteristics
- Type: Paddle steamer
- Displacement: 589 long tons (598 t)
- Length: 210 ft (64 m)
- Beam: 24 ft 6 in (7.47 m)
- Draft: 9 ft (2.7 m)
- Depth of hold: 13 ft 3 in (4.04 m)
- Installed power: 230 hp (170 kW)
- Propulsion: 2 × Harvey steam engines; 4 × boilers; 2 × side-wheels
- Speed: 18 kn (21 mph; 33 km/h)
- Complement: 76
- Armament: 1 × 20-pounder rifle, 2 × 24-pounder smoothbore guns

The SS Cornubia was laid down in November 1856 and built in Hayle, Cornwall, by Harvey & Co. She was launched in February 1858 as a packet ship and ferry for the Hayle and Bristol Steam Packet Company. Sleek and painted white, with two funnels mounted close together amidships and with a high bridge over her paddle wheels, she plied the Hayle/St Ives to Bristol route in the days when the Great Western Railway had not penetrated as far as West Cornwall.

== History ==
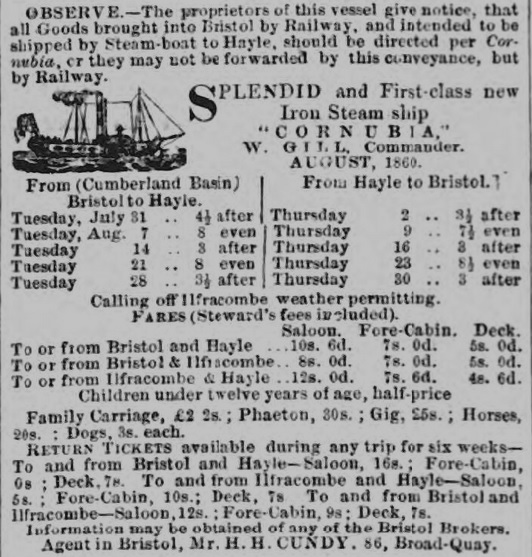
Advert for the SS Cornubia from the Bristol Times and Mirror. Saturday 25 August 1860

She was given the name Cornubia from the Latinised name for Cornwall and was a fast iron paddle steamer, long and narrow at 210 ft (64 m) long and with a 24 ft 6 in (7.47 m) beam. Her Harveys-built twin oscillating side-wheel engines with four boilers and 9 ft (2.7 m) stroke produced 230 hp (170 kW) and was capable of propelling the vessel at over 18 kn (21 mph; 33 km/h). Her shallow, 9 ft (2.7 m) draft was initially designed to cope with the shallow harbours in Cornwall, but proved to be very useful in her later life.

The accommodation on board was described in the Western Daily Press on Monday 19 July 1858 as

A capacious house, with plate-glass windows, tastefully designed, afforded two entrances to the cabin stairs, and the hundreds of visitors who, on Tuesday afternoon, came on board to "have a peep at the new boat" went down those stairs with a sense of being about to look on "something out of the common run." Nor were they disappointed. A more superb cabin they could scarcely have seen before. About a dozen mahogany velvet covered sofas occupied the sides of the capacious room, with velvet covered chairs to match. The panelling of the ceiling was white, with chaste gold mouldings. The side panels were maple, mahogany, and satin wood, with the most elegant of gold moulding. All presented a rich and tasteful appearance, and elicited general commendation. The sleeping berths were well arranged, and proper ventilation was provided throughout. No, the most fastidious and aristocratic of steamboat travellers could certainly fine no fault here - all was perfection.

She ran between Bristol and Hayle from 1858 to 1861, calling additionally at Ilfracombe. By 1860 she was under the command of W. Gill and departures in the summer were weekly on Tuesdays from Bristol, returning from Hayle on Thursdays.

Fares

- To or from Bristol and Hayle 10s 6d Saloon (equivalent to £62.29 in 2023), 7s Forecabin (equivalent to £44.49 in 2023), 5s Deck (equivalent to £31.78 in 2023)
- To or from Bristol and Ilfracombe 8s Saloon (equivalent to £47.46 in 2023), 7s Forecabin (equivalent to £41.53 in 2023), 5s Deck (equivalent to £31.78 in 2023)
- To or from Ilfracombe and Hayle 12s Saloon (equivalent to £76.27 in 2023), 7s Forecabin (equivalent to £44.49 in 2023), 4s 6d Deck (equivalent to £28.6 in 2023)

== Confederate Navy Service ==
During the American Civil War, agents for the Confederacy purchased Cornubia in November 1861 and took her over the Atlantic where she was officially renamed Lady Davis though by all accounts her old name Cornubia was also commonly used.

She proved to be a very good investment. Her speed, manoeuvrability and shallow draft making her an excellent blockade runner. She successfully avoided and outran Union forces on 22 occasions bringing vital supplies to the confederate army at Wilmington.

On her 23rd run on 8 November 1863, however luck ran out for Cornubia. She was pursued by Niphon and was forced to run up onto the beach at New Inlet. The ship's captain, Richard Gayle, the ship's carpenter and one seaman remained onboard and helped other crew and passengers to escape to shore.

Later that same day, James Adger arrived on the scene and on the rising tide towed the still-intact Cornubia free. She was then sent to Boston as a Prize together with the bags of waterlogged mail. The abandoned mail proved to be a vital aid to the Union, gaining an insight into the Confederacy plans and in particularly the role that British seamen were taking in blockade running.

== Union Navy Service ==
Cornubia was purchased from the Boston Prize court and then commissioned in the Union Navy on 17 March 1864 and assigned to the role of blockading the waters around Mobile and Pensacola, before later being reassigned to the coast of Texas. The blockade runner had now become a blockader.

On 21 April 1865, Cornubia captured the blockade-running schooner Chaos. On 24 May, Cornubia captured the guard boat Le Compt where a cache of arms was found. Later the same day, Cornubia assisted Princess Royal in the pursuit and sinking of the Confederate steamer Denbigh.

Following the evacuation of Galveston on 22 May, Cornubia was put on duty removing the harbour obstructions. On 3 August, Cornubia was officially decommissioned from the Union Navy and was sold on 25 October.

== See also ==
- Union Navy
- Confederate States Navy
