= John Harvey (ironfounder) =

- Born: 1730
- Died: 1803 (aged 72–73)
- Engineering career
- Discipline: Mechanical
- Projects: Harvey & Co of Hayle
- Significant design: Improvement of the beam engine

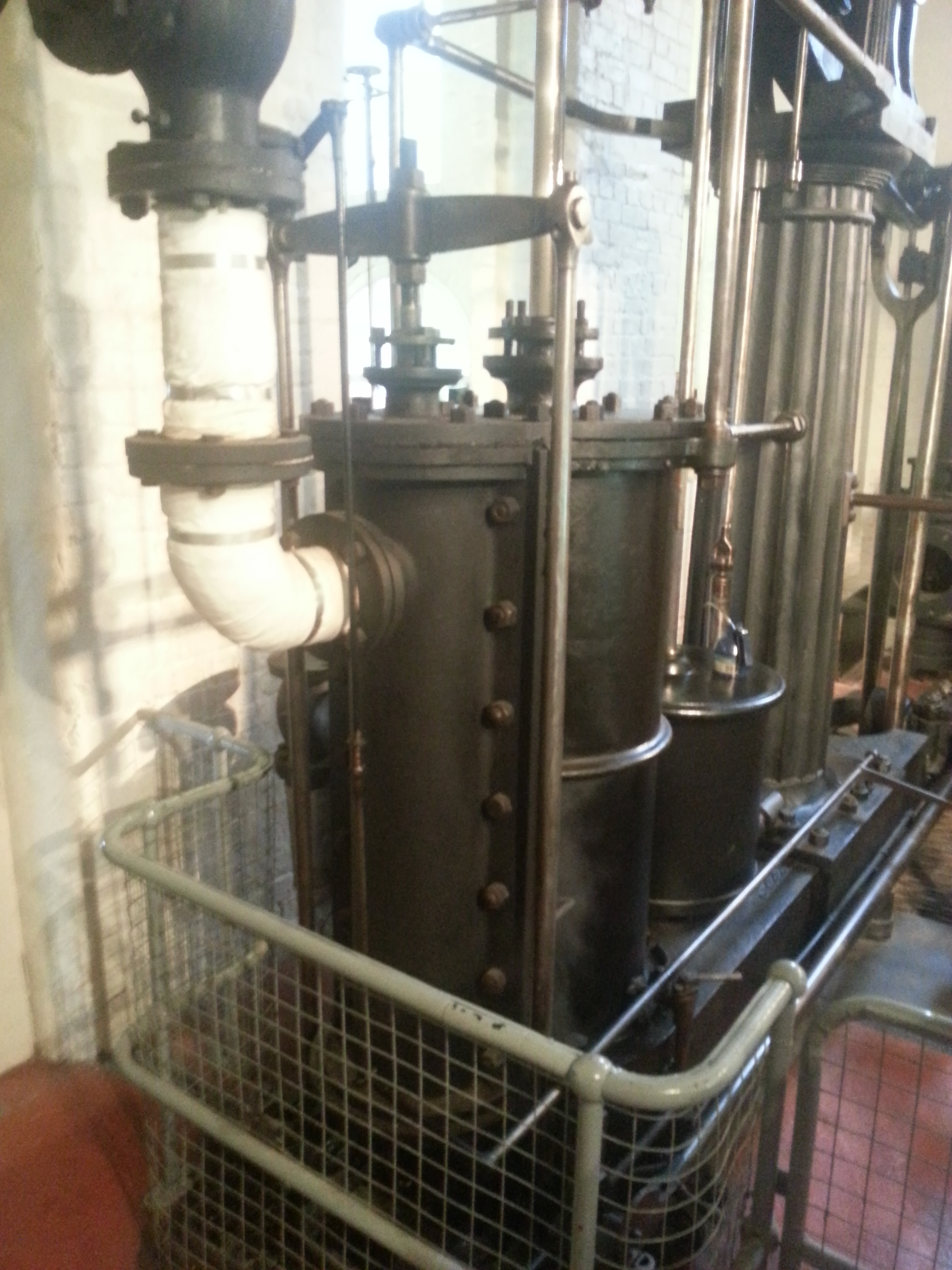
Simpson design waterworks beam engine by Harvey's of Hayle, Hereford Waterworks Museum

John Harvey was a Cornishman whose career started as a blacksmith and engineer at Carnhell Green near Hayle, in west Cornwall. In 1779 he established a foundry and engineering works at Hayle called Harvey & Co. By 1800 the company employed more than 50 people and continued to grow as Harvey worked with many of the great Cornish engineers and entrepreneurs of the day. These included Richard Trevithick, William West, and, more importantly, Arthur Woolf. In 1797, Harvey's daughter, Jane, married Richard Trevithick.

Harvey & Co. built up a reputation for world class stationary beam engines designed to pump water out of the deep Cornish tin and copper mines. The Cornish beam engine became world-famous and was exported overseas, and remains the largest type of beam engine ever constructed; the largest of all, with a 144-inch-diameter (3,700 mm) cylinder which powered eight separate beams, was used to drain the Haarlemmermeer in the Netherlands—it is preserved in the Museum De Cruquius.

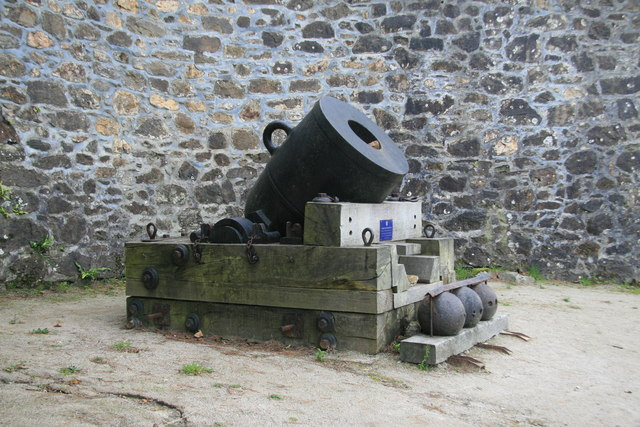
Crimean siege mortar made by Harvey's of Hayle

Harvey's also produced a range of products, from hand tools to ocean-going ships including the USS Cornubia. The company was expanded by John's son, Henry, in collaboration with Arthur Woolf, who was the chief engineer. At that time it was the main mining engine foundry in the world, with an international market served through their own port at Foundry Town, Hayle.

Harvey's of Hayle reached their peak in the early- to mid-19th century and then, along with the Cornish mining industry in general, suffered a gradual and slow decline. Harvey's acquired the Cornish Copper Company in 1875. The engineering works and foundry were closed in 1903, although the company continued to trade as a general and builders merchant, eventually merging with UBM to become Harvey-UBM in 1969.

== List of ships ==
Ship	GRT	Yard No	For	Date of launch
Henry Harvey				23 May 1857
Cornubia	589		Hayle and Bristol Steam Packet Company	27 February 1858
SS Riviere	124			1860
Minros			Charles Henry Smith of Swansea	22 April 1860
Penair	213			1862
Royal Bride	286			March 1863
Welsh Girl				1 August 1863
Cornish Girl	175		Porthleven United Shipping Company	April 1864
Eliza Bain	300		Hitchens, Bain and Company	12 November 1864
SS St Agnes	175		Mr. Hitchens of St Agnes	24 June 1865
SS Bessie	287			6 September 1865
SS Margaret	232			June 1866
SS Western Wave	229			25 October 1866
SS Hayle	353		Tom Mawr Company of Neath	10 June 1867
Unnamed Brigantine	214		Captain H Thomas of St Ives	21 June 1867
SS Mary Johns	181		William Johns of St Ives	21 May 1868
Hannibal	370		Captain Hannibal Thomas	1868
PS Dolphin			South Devon Railway Company	24 July 1869
PS Guide	104		Dartmouth Steam Packet Company	7 September 1869
SS The Girl of the Period	306			27 May 1870
SS Batara Bayon Sree	118		J.B. Mansfield of Teignmouth	8 September 1871
SS Senor Rostro	398		George Batters of London	29 March 1873
SS Frank Batters	380			16 May 1874
SS Lady of the Isles	152		West Cornwall Steam Ship Company	9 March 1875
SS Victor			W. Jewell of Falmouth	10 June 1875
T.S.B.	289		Thomas Bolitho and Sons, Penzance	5 November 1877
SS Penwith	289			February 1878
SS King’s Bridge Packet	110			15 April 1879
SS Thornhill	275	25		October 1880
SS Emperor	106	29		July 1880
SS Tynron	306	26		January 1881
SS Emperor	114	32		July 1883
SS Eagle	103	33		August 1883
SS Dauntless	120	36		October 1884
SS Lanisley	148	42	Thomas Bolitho and Sons, Penzance	June 1887
SS Carnsew	340	39		22 August 1888
SS Dartmeet	655	43	Whiteway and Ball or Torquay	9 August 1888
SS Lyonesse	382	45	West Cornwall Steamship Company	2 February 1889
SS Advance	154	46		1889
SS Tongshan	1750	47		24 October 1889
SS Penwith	1978	48	R.B.Chellew	3 July 1890
SS Penpol	2033	49	R.B. Chellew	12 December 1890
SS Ramleh	2660	51		6 June 1891
SS Landore	539	52	Welsford and Company	23 September 1891
SS Mersey	536	53		30 November 1891
SS Avon	536	54		1892
SS Volney	361	55	Rogers and Bright of Liverpool	25 July 1892
SS Hayle	423	56		20 March 1893

== See also ==
- Mining in Cornwall and Devon
- Hayle and Bristol Steam Packet Company
