= Hayle =

Town in Cornwall, England

Coordinates: 50.186°N 5.419°W

Hayle: Cornish: Heyl
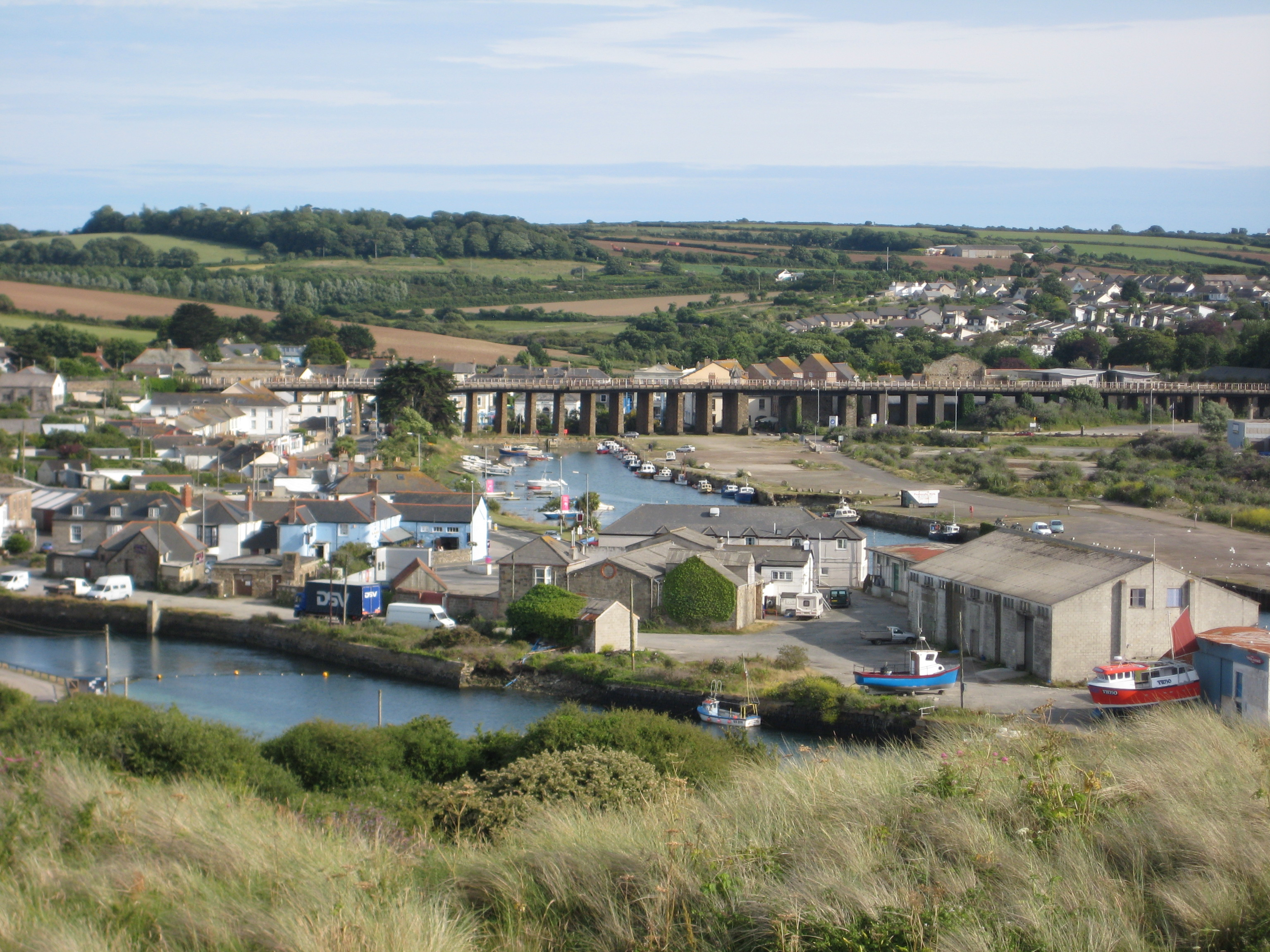
- Hayle Viaduct from a hill by the estuary mouth

- Location within Cornwall
- Population: 9,772 (Parish, 2021); 9,040 (Built up area, 2021)
- OS grid reference: SW561371
- Civil parish: Hayle
- Unitary authority: Cornwall
- Ceremonial county: Cornwall
- Region: South West
- Country: England
- Sovereign state: United Kingdom
- Post town: HAYLE
- Postcode district: TR27
- Dialling code: 01736
- Police: Devon and Cornwall
- Fire: Cornwall
- Ambulance: South Western
- UK Parliament: Camborne and Redruth
- Website: Official website

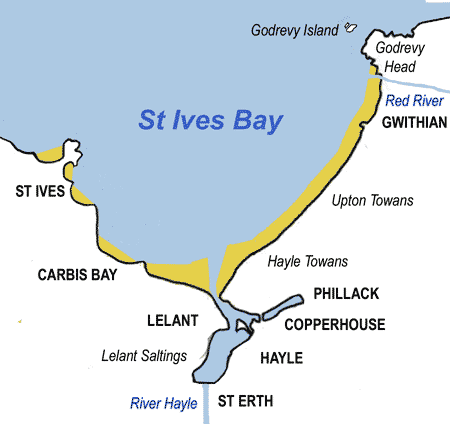
Sketch map showing Hayle and St Ives Bay

Hayle (Cornish: Heyl [hɛɪl], lit. "estuary") is a port town and civil parish in west Cornwall, England, United Kingdom. It is situated at the mouth of the Hayle River (which discharges into St Ives Bay) and is approximately seven miles (11 km) northeast of Penzance.

The parish shares boundaries with St Ives to the west, St Erth to the south, Gwinear and Gwithian in the east, and is bounded to the north by the Celtic Sea. At the 2021 census the population of the parish was 9,772 and the population of the built up area was 9,040.

Hayle was originally three separate settlements that have merged over time: Foundry, Copperhouse and the Towans. In the 19th century, it was known as an important mining port and major centre for manufacturing steam engines.

== History ==
=== Early history ===
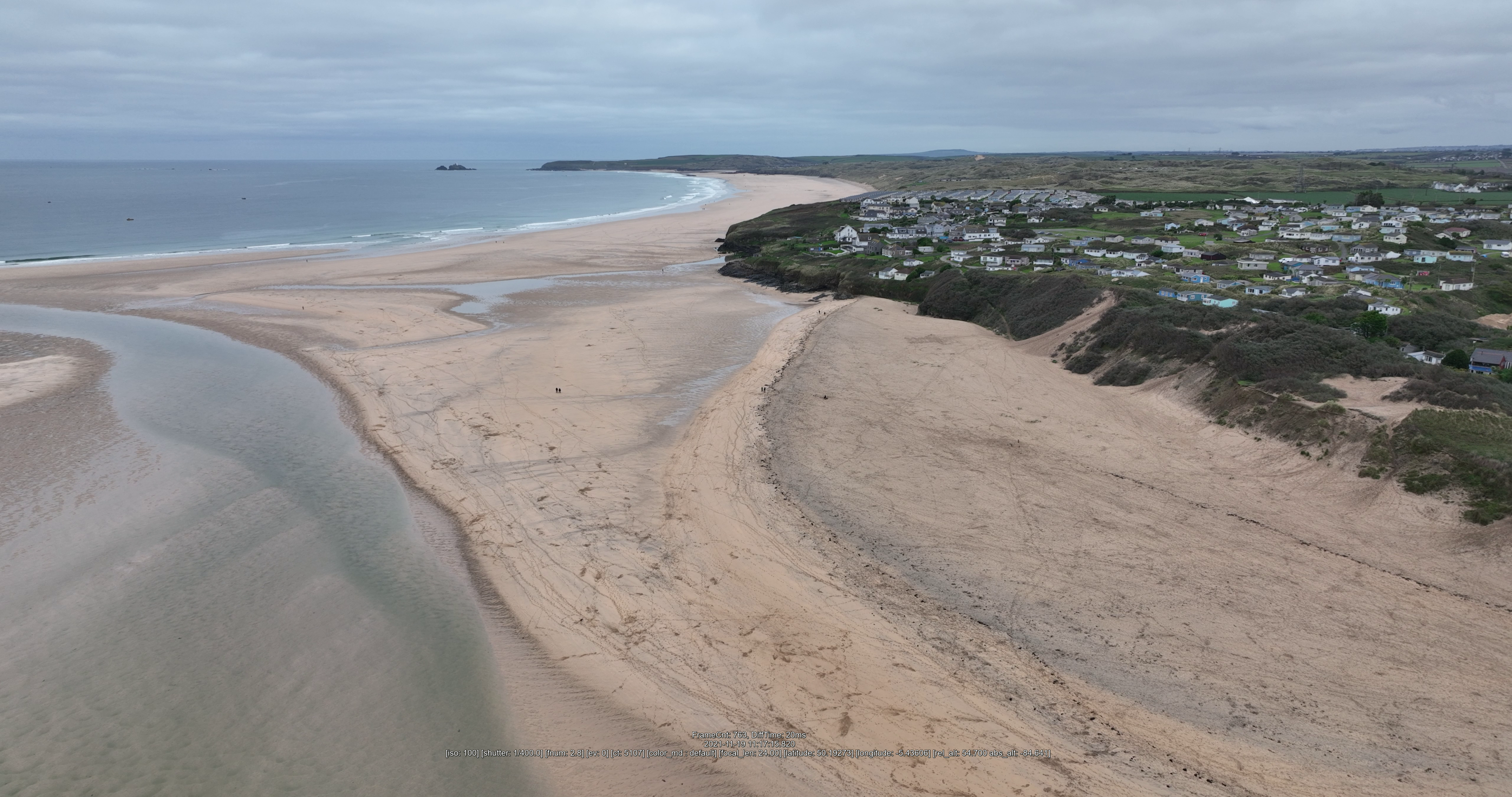
Aerial view of Hayle Harbour and the River Hayle

Although there is a long history of settlement in the Hayle Estuary area dating from the Bronze Age, the modern town of Hayle was built predominantly during the 18th century Industrial Revolution. Evidence of Iron Age settlement exists at the fort on the hill above Carnsew Pool where the Plantation now stands.

It is thought that Hayle was an important centre for the Neolithic tin industry, trading not only with Irish and Breton people, but also the Phoenicians of the eastern Mediterranean. Evidence of this comes from finds of imported pottery including Romano/Grecian Amphorae - containers for wine and oil.

Although the Romans never conquered Cornwall they may have had a military presence in the Hayle Estuary, and it is thought that the rectangular churchyard at St Uny's Church, Lelant on the western shore of the estuary is built within the outline of a Roman fort.

In those times the estuary looked a lot different from that of today. It appears that the estuary was deeper and it was possible for boats to go up the River Hayle as far as where St Erth Bridge is now situated; the tide used to flow in and out of what is now Foundry Square in the town, and at Gwithian reached inland some considerable distance toward Connor Downs.

The departure of the Romans was followed by an influx of Christian missionaries, most of whom are said to have had Irish origins and after whom many Cornish towns take their present name. The lives of Saint Samson and Saint Petroc report that both saints arrived in Cornwall at the Hayle Estuary, indicating that it was an established port at least by the end of the 5th century.

During the mid-6th century, however, the area was held by the Breton exile Tewdwr Mawr (Cornish: Teudar or Teudaric), who was said to have martyred many of them—particularly the members of Saint Breaca's mission—before returning to his patrimony around 577.

A number of inscribed stones from this period have been found in the area. Two early stones have been found at Phillack, one bearing a 'Constantine' form of a Chi-Rho cross which may date to the 5th Century. The most noteworthy inscribed stone is one uncovered during the construction of a road in the grounds of Carnsew, and is now set into a bank at The Plantation, a public park. The stone was discovered in December 1843 by workmen, lying in a horizontal position at the depth of four feet. When the stone was moved it broke into three parts.

A Mr Harvey had it fixed into the wall of his path on Carnsew cliff, within a few feet of the spot where it was discovered, and added a more recent replica which lies next to it, where it has remained since. The stone bears an inscription in Latin, but it is now unreadable. The version that appears on the replica is translated as "Here Cenui fell asleep who was born in 500. Here in his tomb he lies, he lived 33 years." However, in her discussion of this inscription Elisabeth Okasha passes over this transcription in silence, and mentions only three early drawings of this inscription and the results of more recent inspections, then tentatively offers her translation: "Here in peace has rested Cunatdo [or Cunaide]. Here he lies in the tomb. He lived for 33 years."

While physical and documentary evidence indicates that the port continued to be of importance through the Middle Ages, it was the Industrial Revolution that saw the town and port of Hayle grow to resemble the town as seen today.

=== Medieval period ===
The Domesday survey in 1086 shows that the town of Hayle was not yet in existence. The manor of Connerton ("Conarditone") is recorded as including the Hayle Estuary with the manor centred on Conerton, close to the present day village of Gwithian. This was held by the King and was the headmanor of the hundred of Penwith.

It is from Conerton that the name of the present day settlement of Connor Downs is derived. A number of scattered farmsteads are recorded but no substantial settlement. By the 13th century Conerton was owned by the Arundel family until it was purchased by the Cornish Copper Company in the early 19th century.

The first documentary evidence of any settlements around the Hayle Estuary is in 1130 when Phillack Church and surrounding dwellings were recorded as "Egloshayle", meaning the church (eglos) on the estuary (heyl), with the church being dedicated originally to St Felec, as appears in a 10th-century Vatican codex.

=== Industrial revolution ===
Hayle was initially a coal importing and ore exporting port but Hayle was initially dwarfed by nearby Angarrack, where a tin smelter was built in 1704 and mills and stamps converted/constructed to process the ore. Hayle's role was simply to serve as a convenient point to land coal from South Wales, which was then taken to Angarrack by mule. In 1710 a copper and tin smelter was built at Mellanear Farm on the Mellanear stream which prospered for many years

Perhaps the first major development at Hayle was the construction of the first modern quay by John "Merchant" Curnow, in the 1740s, to service the growing mining industry. In 1758 the Cornish Copper Company (CCCo) moved from Camborne and set up a copper smelter at Ventonleague (Copperhouse Creek) and this proved very successful, so much so that a canal was built to bring vessels right up to the works and additional land was purchased on both sides of the creek for industrial use and providing housing for the workers.

The smelting process generated large amounts of waste. The copper slag was cast into large heavy dark bricks or "Scoria Blocks" which were to prove a very useful building material which were used and re-used in the town and can be seen in many buildings. The blocks were sold at 9d (about 4p) for 20 and given free to employees of the CCCo to build their own houses. Sea Lane or Black Road (and Black Bridge) as it is now known was built using these and waste used to fill in the upper reaches of Copperhouse Creek creating Wilson's Pool and dividing it from Copperhouse Pool. Copperhouse Pool was subsequently modified to serve as a tidal reservoir both to allow ships to travel up as far as the dock, (where Home Bargains now stands), and to flush or sluice the channel to keep it clear of sand and silt.

In 1779 John Harvey, a blacksmith from nearby Carnhell Green, established a small foundry and engineering works in the area, now known as Foundry, to supply the local mining industry. The business flourished and by 1800 employed more than 50 people. It went from strength to strength through both professional and family partnerships with a series of great engineers and entrepreneurs. Harvey & Co may be best remembered for producing beam engines, which not only served locally but were exported worldwide; the largest was used to drain the Haarlemmermeerpolder and is preserved at the Museum De Cruquius near Schiphol airport. The company also produced a range of products ranging from hand tools to oceangoing ships, including the SS Cornubia and the world's first steam-powered rock boring machine.

As Harvey's and the Cornish Copper Company continued to thrive, the rivalry between the two grew into open hostility. Disputes regularly erupted over access to the sea as The Cornish Copper Company controlled the dock and the tidal sluice which they had built at Copperhouse. Harveys acted to break the Cornish Copper Company's monopoly by constructing their own harbour by deepening Penpol Creek and building a dock. They even constructed their own tidal reservoir and sluice by creating Carnsew Pool. Harvey's operated a "Company Store policy" forcing workers to buy their provisions from Harvey's Emporium and prohibiting the development of any independent shops. When this policy was finally brought to an end a number of shops quickly established.

Prior to 1825 anyone wanting to go from Hayle to St Ives or Penzance had to cross the sands of Hayle Estuary or make a significant detour crossing the River Hayle at the ancient St Erth Bridge. Guides took travellers across the sands, but, even with guides, it was sometimes a perilous journey and the shifting sand and racing tide claimed several lives. This barrier to trade led to the 1825 formation of the Hayle Bridge Causeway Turnpike Trust with parliament passing the Grigg's Quay, Hayle Bridge and Phillack Road (Cornwall) Act 1825 (6 Geo. 4. c. iv). The turnpike trust built the causeway which now takes the road below the plantation west to the Old Quay House. Costing £5000 in 1825, the investors charged a toll to use the causeway to recover their costs.

As Hayle's prosperity grew the foundry and smelter owners invested in the nearby mining industry. There was relativity little mining in and around Hayle itself, with Wheal Alfred and Wheal Prosper (near Gwithian), being the only mine of any note, the nearest significant mines being around Helston. As Hayle's involvement in the mining industry around Helston grew it eventually reached the point in 1833 that it replaced Helston as the local tin coinage (Stannary) town, although this was short-lived as the Stannary system was abolished in 1838.

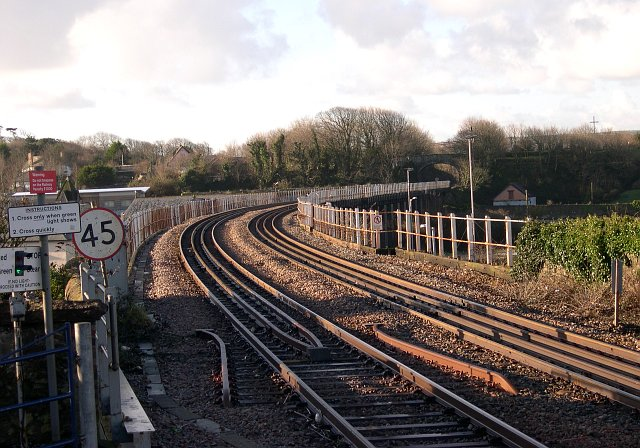
Hayle viaduct from the modern station platform

From 1831 to 1861 the Hayle and Bristol Steam Packet Company operated Steam Packet services which from 1837 connected with the newly opened Hayle-Redruth Railway. Designed from the outset to carry both goods and passengers the Hayle Railway's terminus was in Foundry Square under the present viaduct. Steam was introduced onto the Hayle Section in 1843 but the construction of the railway meant that only light engines could be used, whilst the incline at Angarrack also remained a problem.

In 1852 a new railway was opened spanning the valley on the impressive Angarrack viaduct and passing through Hayle on a new wooden supports over Foundry Square which were later replaced with the current stone pillars. The Harbour Branch line was closed in 1982 and the station buildings and signal box were demolished at the same time breaking direct rail links with the local communities of Praze-an-Beeble, Leedstown and Helston. The original station in Foundry Square remained until after the Second World War when it was demolished.

Harvey's of Hayle reached their peak in the early/mid-19th century but, along with the other foundries and engineering works in Hayle, began a long and slow decline. Harvey's acquired the Cornish Copper Company in 1875 but the downturn continued. The engineering works and Foundry were closed in 1903, although the company continued to trade as general and builders merchant, eventually merging with UBM to become Harvey-UBM in 1969.

The Royal National Lifeboat Institution opened Hayle Lifeboat Station in 1866 and a new boathouse was built in 1897. The lifeboat station closed in 1920, the boathouse then being rebuilt as a store for Hayle Power Station. The first lifeboat was named Isis. It was replaced in 1888 by the New Oriental Bank which was soon renamed E.F. Harrison. The final lifeboat was the Admiral Rodd which was built in 1906. A memorial to the lifeboat has been placed in the Isis Gardens which were opened in 1995 in Foundry Square.

In 1888, the National Explosive works were established on Upton Towans (giving it the alternative name "Dynamite Towans"). Originally built to supply the local mining industry, it soon grew to supply the military and, during the First World War, employed over 1500 people. The remote location on the Towans proved a wise move as there were a number of accidents resulting in explosions.

=== The 20th century ===
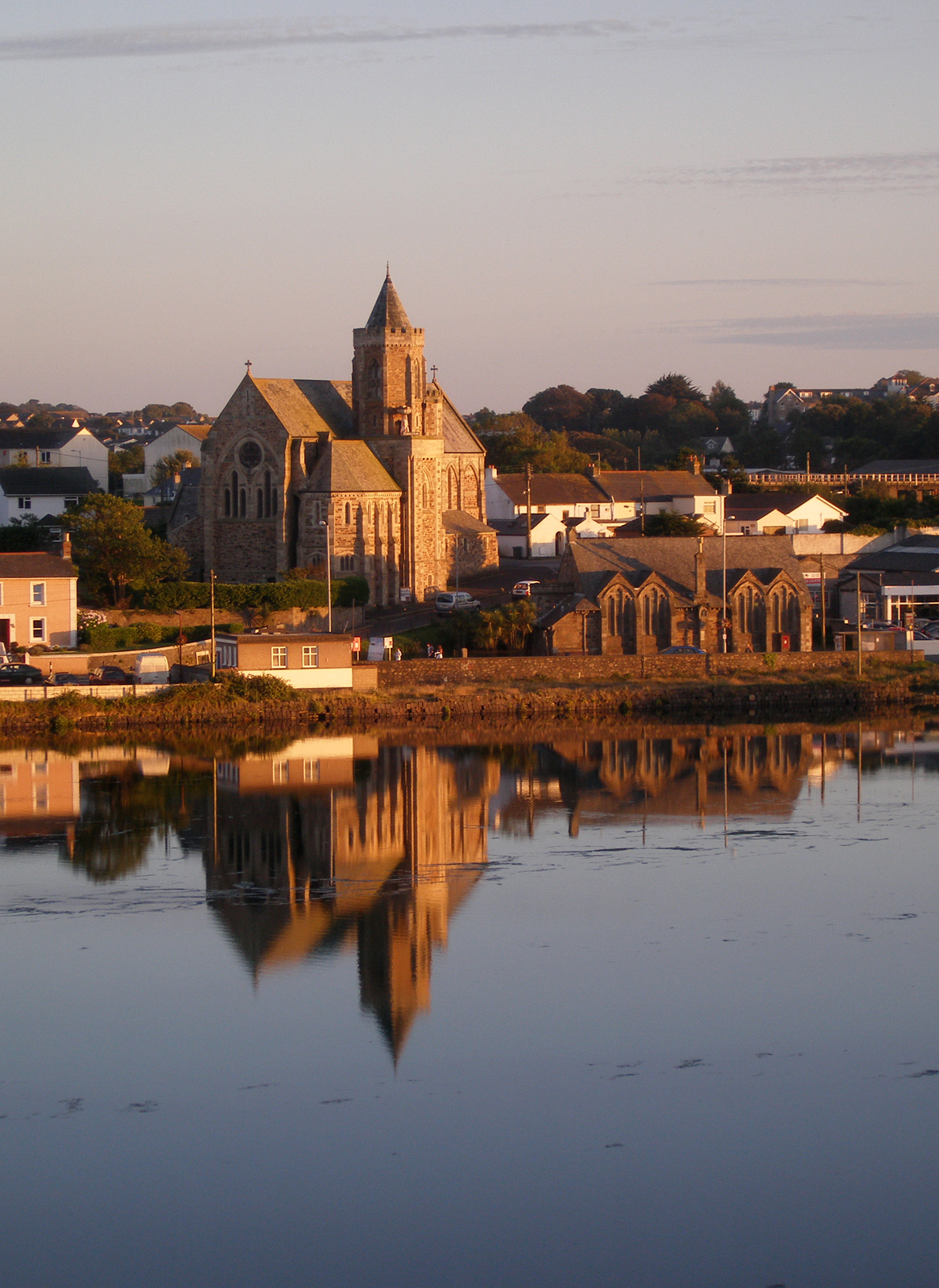
Reflection of Hayle in the Copperhouse Pool at high-tide

Explosive manufacture ceased in 1920, although parts of the site were used as an explosives store until the 1960s. The area is now a nature reserve managed by the Cornwall Wildlife Trust.

1910 saw the opening of Hayle Power Station on Harvey's Towans. It was coal-fired and the coal was supplied by ship from South Wales until the station was closed in 1977. At the same time Hayle Harbour was also closed to commercial shipping, although a locally important fishing fleet, specialising mainly in shellfish remained.

Until the early 20th century Hayle had two very distinct areas of settlement around the competing foundries but slowly buildings began to appear between the two communities. St Elwyn's Church, the Passmore Edwards Institute and a new Drill Hall all appeared within a few years of each other, and housing followed. The Passmore Edwards Institute was just one of a series of institutes and libraries built throughout Cornwall by its eponymous benefactor, who had made a fortune in the publishing business. The town council used it for offices for many years but moved to the Community Centre in April 2008.

In the years between the World Wars a number of small works were established on North Quay, including a glass works, a small oil depot and an ICI plant for producing bromine–a fuel additive for high octane aviation fuel. This additive increased the power of aircraft such as Hurricanes, Spitfires, Lancasters and Mosquitoes. All are now closed and most of the buildings have been demolished. The metalworking business of J & F Pool, founded in 1862, survived in Copperhouse producing perforated and fabricated metal. The engineering tradition continues with the more recent small specialist firms of Bassett Engineering and Rigibore which specialise in tooling and precision engineering products from the Guildford Road Industrial Estate. Rigibore provides tooling to a global market and offers revolutionary products for hole boring. Bassett Engineering offer a wide range of engineering services to the Ministry of Defence.

=== 21st century ===
In autumn 2011 there was a large landslip on the North Cliff and the coastal footpath had to be diverted. In 2025, Hayle received international press attention when Frankie, a fledgling American flamingo, disappeared from Paradise Park Wildlife Sanctuary in the town. Frankie was subsequently located in Brittany.

== Cornish wrestling ==
Cornish wrestling tournaments, for prizes, have been held in Hayle for a least the last 200 years. Tournaments were held at Penpol, the Royal Standard Hotel, the field adjoining Floyd's Hotel, Bodriggy Fields and the Recreation Ground.

== Hayle today ==
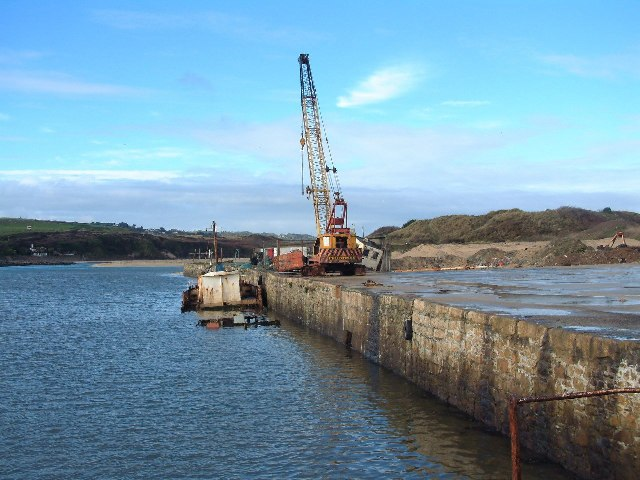
Disused quay in Hayle harbour

Hayle's position by the sea and its 3 miles of golden sandy beaches allowed it to develop as a holiday destination. Indeed, Hayle still has much holiday accommodation. The sand dunes or Towans are the favoured location for a number of holiday villages and caravan and camping sites. The Gwithian beach near Godrevy is picturesque and a popular area for water-related sports including surfing, windsurfing and body-boarding.

The local community radio station is Coast FM (formerly Penwith Radio), which broadcasts on 96.5 and 97.2 FM.

=== Hayle Harbour development and regeneration ===
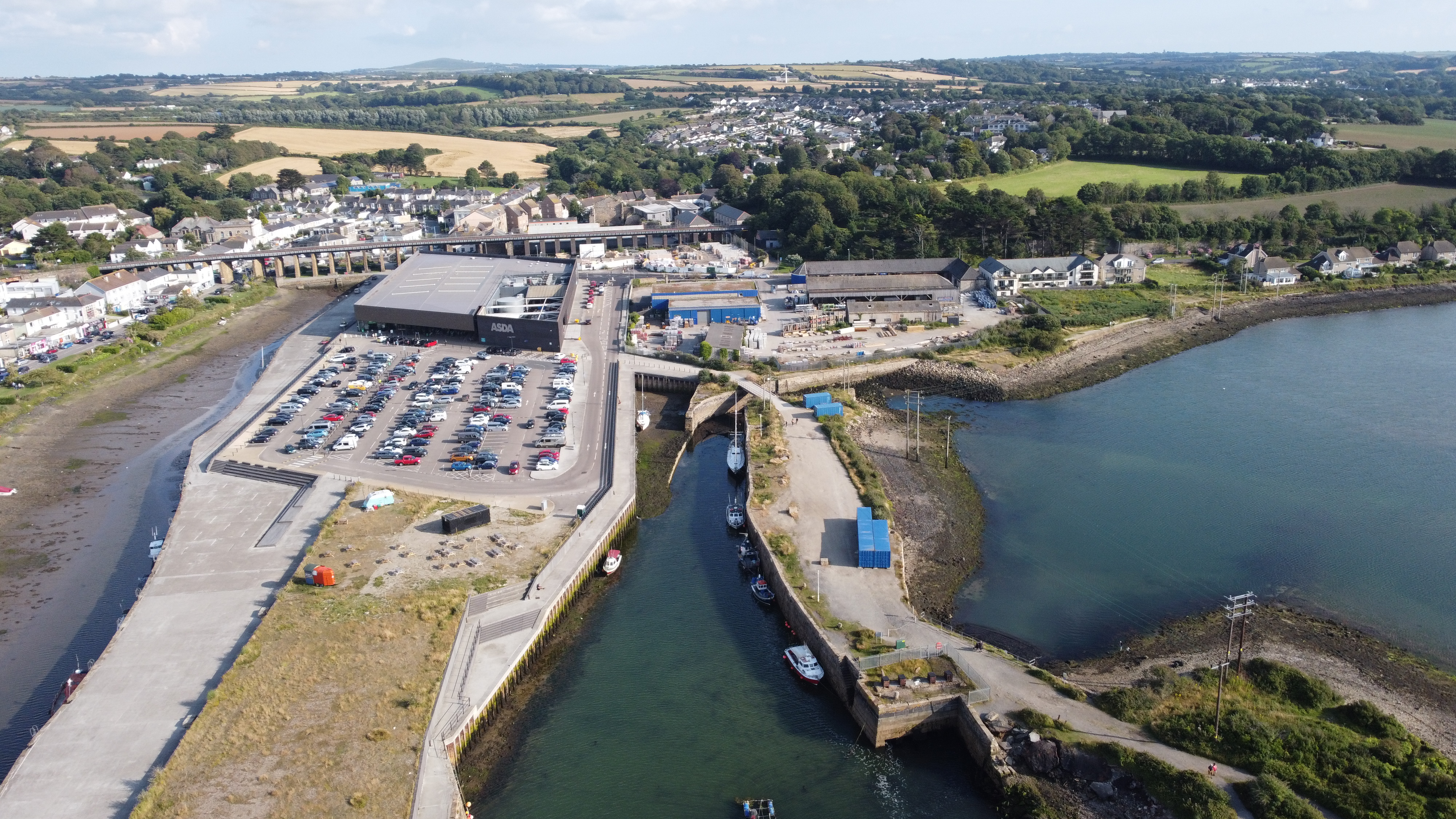
Aerial view of Hayle harbour and ASDA supermarket

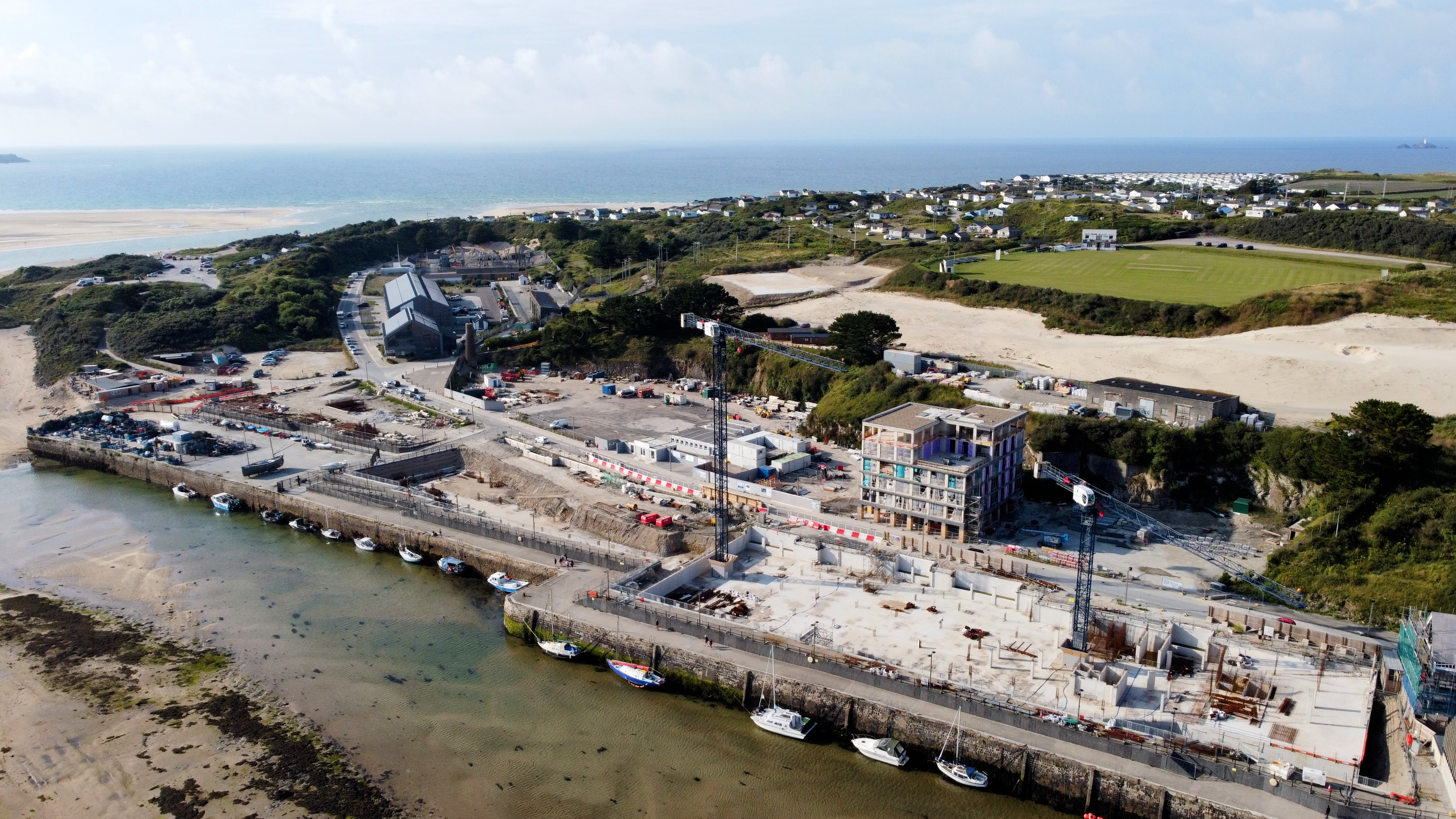
North Quay under development in 2021

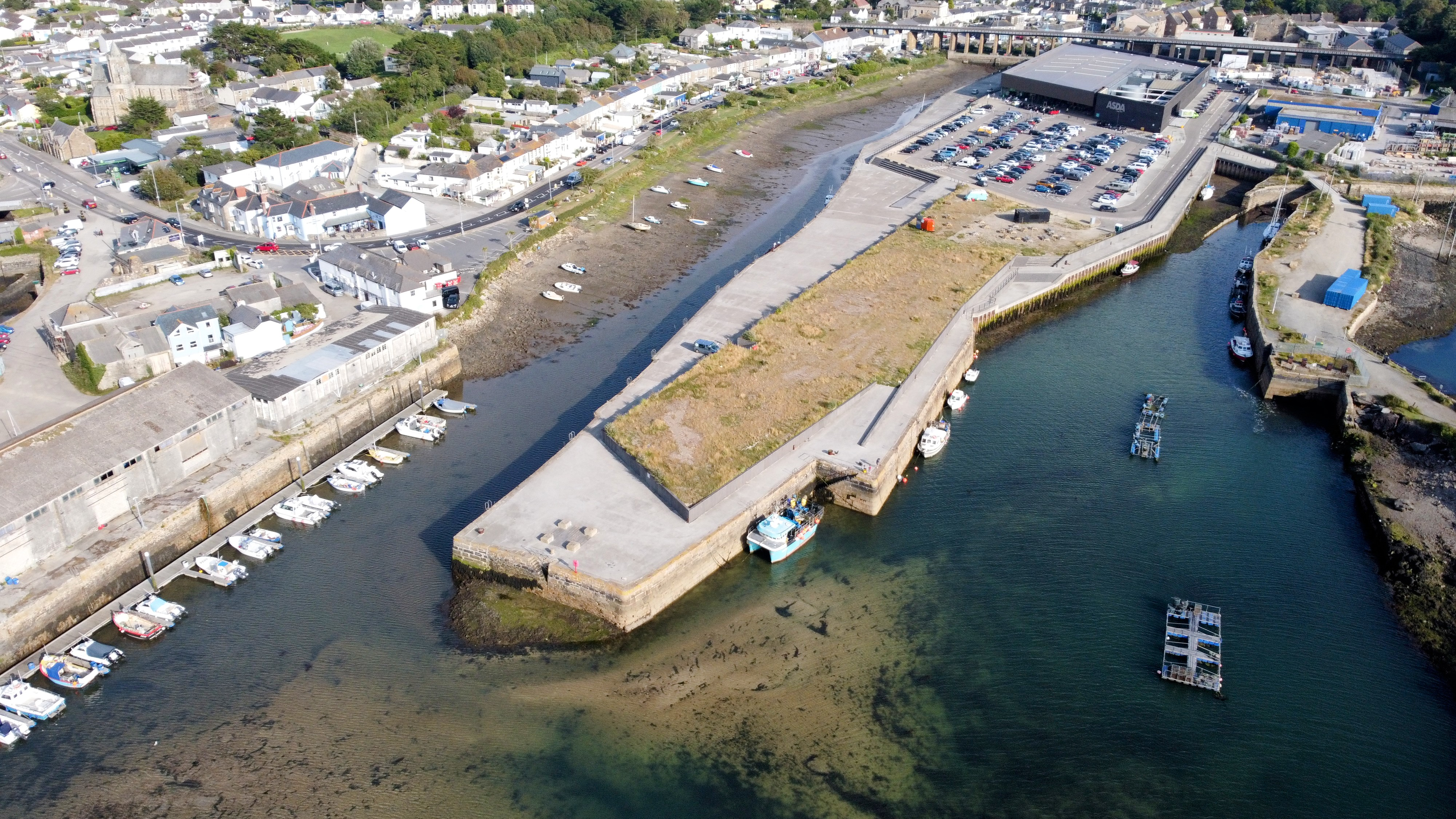
South Quay in 2021, with ASDA supermarket in the background

Since the 1980s, Hayle Harbour has been the focus of several projects and schemes aimed at regenerating the local economy of Penwith. In the 1980s, well-known businessman Peter de Savary fronted an attempt to develop the harbour area but ultimately failed to attract financial support to bring his plans to fruition. Despite several other similar schemes, today the harbour is still not regenerated. In 2004, ING Real Estate, an international property development company, became the owners of Hayle harbour and started to purchase land within the immediate vicinity of their planned project area.

In April 2008, ING submitted an outline planning application to the planning department of Penwith District Council. As of November 2009, the granting of outline planning permission still depends on the Section 106 Agreement being agreed, a sticking point to this is finalising traffic and transport improvements.

Outside of the harbour area, Hayle has been the site of a number of successful regeneration schemes; including the ongoing Harveys Foundry project which has seen the development of business and residential units in the hope of attracting employment to the Hayle area; and projects being progressed through the Hayle Area Plan include retail developments.

Asda opened a large superstore on the South Quay of Hayle on 24 November 2014. The design of the building, by Feilden Clegg Bradley Studios had to fit into its local surroundings because it is situated in an area which is part of a UNESCO world heritage site. A new petrol station plan for the store was submitted in 2017. Quayside housing, watersports facilities, an arts centre, improved facilities for local fishermen, bars and restaurants are also planned as part of the ongoing regeneration of the area.

=== World Heritage ===
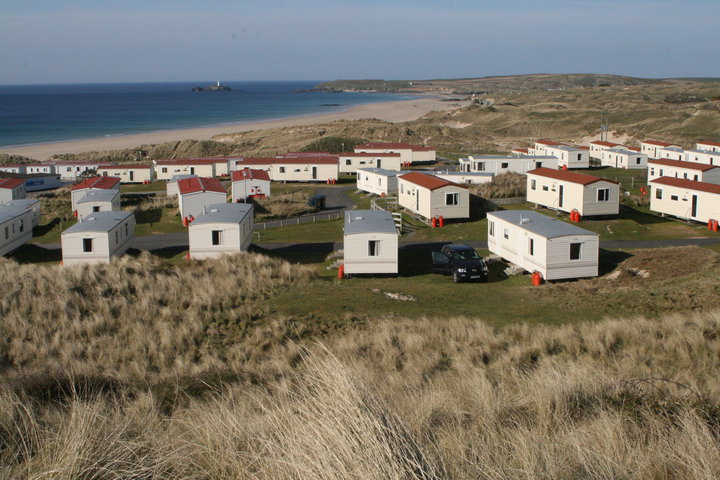
St Ives Bay Holiday Park in Hayle with Godrevy Lighthouse in distance

The townscape of Hayle and its historic harbour were part of the initial submission of the Cornwall and West Devon historic mining landscape World Heritage bid. On 13 July 2006 it was announced that the bid had been successful and that the Cornwall and West Devon Mining Landscape would be added to World Heritage list. The Port of Hayle was one ten areas identified within this site.

=== Transport ===
Hayle railway station is close to Foundry Square, at the east end of the viaduct. It is also linked to the harbour area along a footpath that used to be the branch railway line serving the quays. It is served by Great Western Railway and CrossCountry with local services to Plymouth and services to destinations including London Paddington, Manchester Piccadilly and beyond. National Express run three daily services from Hayle stopping at Foundry Square and Copperhouse, they are:

- 1 x 330 coach to Nottingham with major stops at Camborne, Redruth, Newquay, Bodmin, Plymouth, Bristol, Birmingham and Leicester.
- 2 x 500 coaches to London Victoria with major stops at Camborne, Redruth, Truro, St Austell, Liskeard, Plymouth, Taunton and London Heathrow Airport.

=== Notable buildings ===
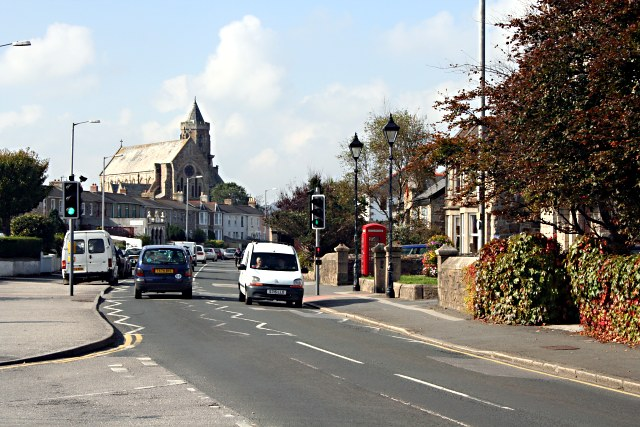
Commercial Road, Hayle (St Elwyn's Church in the background)

Godrevy Lighthouse, at the eastern end of Hayle Towans, is said to have inspired Virginia Woolf's novel To the Lighthouse.

The church of St Elwyn was built in 1886–88 to the design of J. D. Sedding. According to Pevsner it is "loud outside ... and dull inside".

Trevassack Manor is a house of the 17th to 18th century; there is a datestone of 1700. Bodriggy House is of granite, ca. 1710.

== Governance ==
There are two tiers of local government covering Hayle, at parish (town) and unitary authority level: Hayle Town Council and Cornwall Council. The town council is based at the Hayle Community Centre at 58 Queensway.

=== Administrative history ===
Hayle historically straddled the ancient parishes of Phillack and St Erth, both of which formed part of the Penwith Hundred of Cornwall. In March 1866 a local government district was created for a newly-defined Hayle district, covering parts of both Phillack and St Erth parishes. The new district was administered by an elected local board. A separate local government district was created in September 1866 for the remainder of Phillack parish, including Copperhouse.

Such districts were reconstituted as urban districts under the Local Government Act 1894. The 1894 Act also directed that civil parishes could no longer straddle district boundaries, and so the part of St Erth parish in Hayle Urban District became a new parish called "St Erth Urban", the part of Phillack parish in Hayle Urban District became a parish called "Phillack West", and the part of Phillack parish in Phillack Urban District became a parish called "Phillack East". As urban parishes these three civil parishes did not qualify for parish councils; the two local authorities covering the area were Hayle Urban District Council and Phillack Urban District Council.

Hayle Urban District and Phillack Urban District were both abolished in 1934, being absorbed into West Penwith Rural District. Hayle Urban District Council assumed that a rural parish matching the abolished Hayle Urban District would be created, allowing for the creation of a Hayle Parish Council. However, the way the order abolishing the urban districts was drafted, it was not the two abolished urban districts but the three civil parishes of St Erth Urban, Phillack West and Phillack East which became rural parishes, with St Erth Urban being renamed Hayle despite only covering the western half of the town centre. On realising that this was the effect, the outgoing Hayle Urban District Council petitioned for the order to be amended, but was told it was too late. It subsequently proved impossible to form the three new parish councils as not enough people were willing to stand. An inquiry was held in January 1935 into changing the parish boundaries, which was told that the fact the 1934 order perpetuated three parishes to cover the Hayle area was "regarded locally as absurd". The inquiry concluded that the three parishes of Hayle (formerly St Erth Urban), Phillack West and Phillack East should be merged into a single parish of Hayle, which took effect on 1 October 1935.

West Penwith Rural District was abolished in 1974 under the Local Government Act 1972, when the area became part of the Penwith district. As part of the 1974 reforms, parish councils were given the right to declare their parishes to be a town, allowing them to take the title of town council and giving the title of mayor to the council's chairperson. Hayle Parish Council exercised this right, becoming Hayle Town Council with effect from 1 April 1974.

Penwith district was abolished in 2009. Cornwall County Council then took on district-level functions, making it a unitary authority, and was renamed Cornwall Council.

== Education ==
The local secondary school is Hayle Academy.

== Media ==
Local TV coverage is provided by BBC South West and ITV West Country. Television signals are received from either the Redruth or Caradon Hill TV transmitters. Local radio stations are BBC Radio Cornwall on 103.9 FM, Heart West on 107.0 FM, and Coast FM, a community radio station that broadcast to the town on 96.5 FM. The town is served by the local newspapers: St. Ives Times & Echo, The West Briton and The Cornishman.

== Twinning ==
Hayle is twinned with Pordic in Brittany, France.

== Notable residents ==
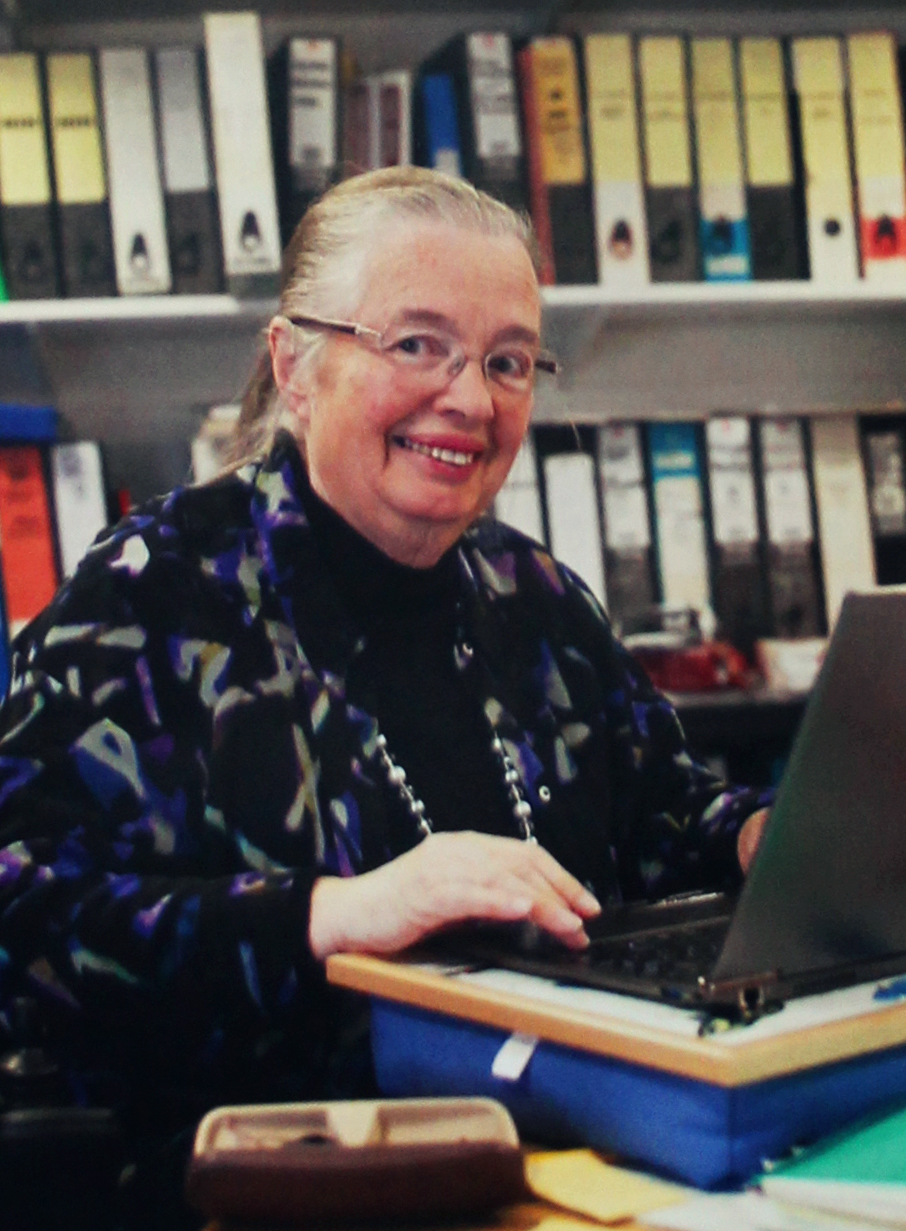
Professor Jean Golding, 2010

- John Harvey (1730–1803), ironfounder, blacksmith and engineer at Carnhell Green
- Henry Jenner (1848–1934), antiquary, scholar of the Cornish language.
- Kitty Lee Jenner (1853–1936), artist, bard and writer; helped set up the Cornish Gorsedh.
- Francis Cargeeg (1893–1981), coppersmith, born in Carnsew
- John Gilbert Cock (1893–1966), born in Hayle, the first Cornish footballer to score for the England national team; played over 400 pro games
- Donald Cock (1896–1974), an English footballer, played over 200 pro games
- Admiral of the Fleet Sir Caspar John, (1903–1984), First Sea Lord from 1960 to 1963; moved to Hayle on retiring and died there.
- Richard Cyril Rescorla (1939–2001), policeman and soldier, born in the town, served in the British and American armed forces, died in the attack on the World Trade Center.
- Jean Golding, (born 1939), a British epidemiologist.
- Frankie (born 2025), a Caribbean flamingo.

== See also ==
- Hayle Academy
- St Michael's Hospital, Hayle
