= List of United Kingdom locations: La-Laz =

The United Kingdom

This is part of the list of United Kingdom locations: a gazetteer of place names in the United Kingdom showing each place's locality and geographical coordinates.

== La ==
=== Lab–Lam ===
| Location | Locality | Coordinates (links to map & photo sources) | OS grid reference |
|---|---|---|---|
| Labost | Western Isles | 58.34°N 06.66°W | NB2749 |
| Lacasaidh | Western Isles | 58.09°N 06.53°W | NB3321 |
| Lacasdal | Western Isles | 58.21°N 06.39°W | NB4234 |
| Laceby | North East Lincolnshire | 53.53°N 00.17°W | TA2106 |
| Laceby Acres | North East Lincolnshire | 53.54°N 00.14°W | TA2307 |
| Lacey Green | Buckinghamshire | 51.69°N 00.81°W | SP8200 |
| Lacey Green | Cheshire | 53.33°N 02.24°W | SJ8482 |
| Lach Dennis | Cheshire | 53.23°N 02.45°W | SJ7071 |
| Lache | Cheshire | 53.16°N 02.92°W | SJ3864 |
| Lackenby | Redcar and Cleveland | 54.56°N 01.13°W | NZ5619 |
| Lackford | Suffolk | 52.29°N 00.60°E | TL7870 |
| Lacock | Wiltshire | 51.41°N 02.13°W | ST9168 |
| Ladbroke | Warwickshire | 52.21°N 01.40°W | SP4158 |
| Laddenvean | Cornwall | 50.04°N 05.10°W | SW7821 |
| Laddingford | Kent | 51.20°N 00.41°E | TQ6948 |
| Lade | Kent | 50.94°N 00.95°E | TR0820 |
| Lade Bank | Lincolnshire | 53.06°N 00.07°E | TF3954 |
| Ladies' Riggs | North Yorkshire | 54.08°N 01.78°W | SE1465 |
| Ladmanlow | Derbyshire | 53.23°N 01.94°W | SK0471 |
| Ladock | Cornwall | 50.31°N 04.96°W | SW8950 |
| Ladwell | Hampshire | 51.00°N 01.40°W | SU4223 |
| Ladybank | Fife | 56.26°N 03.13°W | NO3009 |
| Ladybrook | Nottinghamshire | 53.14°N 01.22°W | SK5261 |
| Ladyburn | Inverclyde | 55.93°N 04.72°W | NS3075 |
| Ladycross | Cornwall | 50.66°N 04.37°W | SX3288 |
| Ladyes Hills | Warwickshire | 52.34°N 01.57°W | SP2972 |
| Lady Green | Sefton | 53.51°N 03.04°W | SD3103 |
| Lady Hall | Cumbria | 54.25°N 03.24°W | SD1985 |
| Lady Halton | Shropshire | 52.37°N 02.77°W | SO4775 |
| Lady House | Rochdale | 53.59°N 02.12°W | SD9211 |
| Ladykirk | Scottish Borders | 55.71°N 02.19°W | NT8847 |
| Ladyoak | Shropshire | 52.62°N 02.94°W | SJ3603 |
| Lady Park | Gateshead | 54.91°N 01.62°W | NZ2458 |
| Ladyridge | Herefordshire | 51.97°N 02.59°W | SO5931 |
| Lady's Green | Suffolk | 52.20°N 00.55°E | TL7559 |
| Lady's Holm | Shetland Islands | 59.87°N 01.33°W | HU374097 |
| Ladywell | Lewisham | 51.44°N 00.02°W | TQ3774 |
| Ladywell | Shropshire | 52.90°N 02.75°W | SJ4934 |
| Ladywell | West Lothian | 55.89°N 03.53°W | NT0468 |
| Ladywood | Birmingham | 52.47°N 01.92°W | SP0586 |
| Ladywood | Shropshire | 52.62°N 02.48°W | SJ6703 |
| Ladywood | Worcestershire | 52.24°N 02.19°W | SO8761 |
| Lady Wood | Leeds | 53.82°N 01.50°W | SE3337 |
| Laffak | St Helens | 53.47°N 02.72°W | SJ5298 |
| Laga | Highland | 56.68°N 05.87°W | NM6361 |
| Laganbuidhe | Argyll and Bute | 56.39°N 04.98°W | NN1627 |
| Lagavulin | Argyll and Bute | 55.62°N 06.13°W | NR4045 |
| Lagg | Argyll and Bute | 55.93°N 05.86°W | NR5978 |
| Lagg | North Ayrshire | 55.44°N 05.24°W | NR9521 |
| Laggan (Badenoch) | Highland | 57.01°N 04.29°W | NN6194 |
| Laggan (Great Glen) | Highland | 57.02°N 04.81°W | NN2996 |
| Lagganlia | Highland | 57.10°N 03.90°W | NH8503 |
| Laggan Point | Argyll and Bute | 55.71°N 06.33°W | NR281558 |
| Lagness | West Sussex | 50.79°N 00.73°W | SU8900 |
| Laide | Highland | 57.86°N 05.55°W | NG8992 |
| Laigh Carnduff | South Lanarkshire | 55.68°N 04.13°W | NS6646 |
| Laigh Fenwick | East Ayrshire | 55.64°N 04.44°W | NS4642 |
| Laigh Glengall | South Ayrshire | 55.42°N 04.62°W | NS3418 |
| Laighstonehall | South Lanarkshire | 55.76°N 04.07°W | NS7054 |
| Laindon | Essex | 51.57°N 00.40°E | TQ6789 |
| Lair | Highland | 57.47°N 05.32°W | NH0148 |
| Laira | Devon | 50.37°N 04.11°W | SX5055 |
| Lairg | Highland | 58.02°N 04.40°W | NC5806 |
| Lairg Muir | Highland | 58.03°N 04.40°W | NC5807 |
| Laisterdyke | Bradford | 53.79°N 01.72°W | SE1833 |
| Laithes | Cumbria | 54.68°N 02.83°W | NY4633 |
| Laithkirk | Durham | 54.61°N 02.07°W | NY9524 |
| Laity Moor | Cornwall | 50.25°N 05.24°W | SW6945 |
| Lake (Tawstock) | Devon | 51.06°N 04.07°W | SS5531 |
| Lake (Sourton) | Devon | 50.67°N 04.09°W | SX5288 |
| Lake (Shebbear) | Devon | 50.85°N 04.21°W | SS4409 |
| Lake | Dorset | 50.70°N 02.02°W | SY9890 |
| Lake | Isle of Wight | 50.64°N 01.18°W | SZ5883 |
| Lake | Wiltshire | 51.15°N 01.81°W | SU1339 |
| Lake End | Buckinghamshire | 51.50°N 00.67°W | SU9279 |
| Lakenham | Norfolk | 52.61°N 01.29°E | TG2307 |
| Lakenheath | Suffolk | 52.40°N 00.51°E | TL7182 |
| Laker's Green | Surrey | 51.10°N 00.53°W | TQ0335 |
| Lakeside | Cumbria | 54.27°N 02.96°W | SD3787 |
| Lakeside | Essex | 51.48°N 00.27°E | TQ5879 |
| Lakeside | Worcestershire | 52.30°N 01.92°W | SP0567 |
| Laleham | Surrey | 51.40°N 00.49°W | TQ0568 |
| Laleston | Bridgend | 51.49°N 03.62°W | SS8779 |
| Lamanva | Cornwall | 50.13°N 05.13°W | SW7631 |
| Lamarsh | Essex | 51.98°N 00.75°E | TL8935 |
| Lamas | Norfolk | 52.75°N 01.31°E | TG2423 |
| Lamba | Shetland Islands | 60.51°N 01.29°W | HU386813 |
| Lamba Ness | Shetland Islands | 60.81°N 00.76°W | HP671156 |
| Lamb Corner | Essex | 51.94°N 00.96°E | TM0431 |
| Lambden | Scottish Borders | 55.68°N 02.41°W | NT7443 |
| Lamberden | Kent | 51.02°N 00.59°E | TQ8228 |
| Lamberhead Green | Wigan | 53.53°N 02.69°W | SD5404 |
| Lamberhurst | Kent | 51.09°N 00.38°E | TQ6736 |
| Lamberhurst Quarter | Kent | 51.11°N 00.35°E | TQ6538 |
| Lambert's End | Sandwell | 52.51°N 02.01°W | SO9991 |
| Lambeth | London Borough of Lambeth | 51.48°N 00.12°W | TQ3078 |
| Lambfair Green | Suffolk | 52.14°N 00.49°E | TL7153 |
| Lambfoot | Cumbria | 54.65°N 03.30°W | NY1630 |
| Lamb Head | Orkney Islands | 59.07°N 02.54°W | HY688213 |
| Lambhill | City of Glasgow | 55.89°N 04.28°W | NS5769 |
| Lamb Holm | Orkney Islands | 58.88°N 02.90°W | HY481002 |
| Lambley | Northumberland | 54.91°N 02.51°W | NY6758 |
| Lambley | Nottinghamshire | 52.99°N 01.06°W | SK6345 |
| Lambourn | Berkshire | 51.50°N 01.54°W | SU3278 |
| Lambourne | Cornwall | 50.31°N 05.14°W | SW7651 |
| Lambourne | Essex | 51.64°N 00.12°E | TQ4796 |
| Lambourne End | Essex | 51.62°N 00.12°E | TQ4794 |
| Lambourn Woodlands | Berkshire | 51.47°N 01.55°W | SU3175 |
| Lambridge | Bath and North East Somerset | 51.39°N 02.34°W | ST7666 |
| Lambrook | Dorset | 50.76°N 02.75°W | SY4796 |
| Lamb's Cross | Kent | 51.20°N 00.56°E | TQ7948 |
| Lambs' Green | Dorset | 50.78°N 02.01°W | SY9998 |
| Lambs Green | West Sussex | 51.11°N 00.27°W | TQ2136 |
| Lambston | Pembrokeshire | 51.80°N 05.04°W | SM9016 |
| Lambton | Sunderland | 54.88°N 01.54°W | NZ2955 |
| Lamellion | Cornwall | 50.44°N 04.48°W | SX2463 |
| Lamerton | Devon | 50.56°N 04.20°W | SX4476 |
| Lamesley | Gateshead | 54.91°N 01.61°W | NZ2558 |
| Laminess | Orkney Islands | 59.21°N 02.68°W | HY6137 |
| Lamington | Highland | 57.75°N 04.11°W | NH7476 |
| Lamington | South Lanarkshire | 55.56°N 03.63°W | NS9731 |
| Lamlash | North Ayrshire | 55.52°N 05.13°W | NS0230 |
| Lamledra | Cornwall | 50.23°N 04.79°W | SX0141 |
| Lammack | Lancashire | 53.75°N 02.51°W | SD6629 |
| Lamonby | Cumbria | 54.70°N 02.93°W | NY4035 |
| Lamorbey | Bexley | 51.44°N 00.11°E | TQ4673 |
| Lamorick | Cornwall | 50.44°N 04.77°W | SX0364 |
| Lamorna | Cornwall | 50.06°N 05.57°W | SW4424 |
| Lamorran | Cornwall | 50.23°N 04.98°W | SW8741 |
| Lampeter | Ceredigion | 52.11°N 04.08°W | SN5748 |
| Lampeter Velfrey | Pembrokeshire | 51.79°N 04.68°W | SN1514 |
| Lamphey | Pembrokeshire | 51.66°N 04.87°W | SN0100 |
| Lamplugh | Cumbria | 54.56°N 03.42°W | NY0820 |
| Lamport | Northamptonshire | 52.35°N 00.90°W | SP7574 |
| Lampton | Hounslow | 51.47°N 00.37°W | TQ1376 |
| Lamyatt | Somerset | 51.11°N 02.50°W | ST6535 |

=== Lana–Lane ===
| Location | Locality | Coordinates (links to map & photo sources) | OS grid reference |
|---|---|---|---|
| Lana (Pancrasweek) | Devon | 50.83°N 04.41°W | SS3007 |
| Lana (Tetcott) | Devon | 50.73°N 04.35°W | SX3496 |
| Lanark | South Lanarkshire | 55.66°N 03.78°W | NS8843 |
| Lancaster | Lancashire | 54.04°N 02.81°W | SD4761 |
| Lanchester | Durham | 54.81°N 01.75°W | NZ1647 |
| Lancing | West Sussex | 50.82°N 00.32°W | TQ1804 |
| Landbeach | Cambridgeshire | 52.26°N 00.15°E | TL4765 |
| Landcross | Devon | 50.98°N 04.19°W | SS4623 |
| Landerberry | Aberdeenshire | 57.12°N 02.43°W | NJ7404 |
| Landford | Wiltshire | 50.97°N 01.64°W | SU2519 |
| Landfordwood | Wiltshire | 50.98°N 01.64°W | SU2521 |
| Land Gate | Wigan | 53.50°N 02.64°W | SD5701 |
| Landguard Manor | Isle of Wight | 50.63°N 01.19°W | SZ5782 |
| Landhill | Devon | 50.75°N 04.24°W | SX4297 |
| Landican | Wirral | 53.35°N 03.08°W | SJ2885 |
| Landimore | Swansea | 51.61°N 04.22°W | SS4693 |
| Landkey | Devon | 51.06°N 04.01°W | SS5931 |
| Landkey Newland | Devon | 51.06°N 04.01°W | SS5931 |
| Landore | Swansea | 51.63°N 03.95°W | SS6595 |
| Landport | City of Portsmouth | 50.80°N 01.09°W | SU6401 |
| Landport | East Sussex | 50.87°N 00.01°W | TQ4010 |
| Landrake | Cornwall | 50.41°N 04.29°W | SX3760 |
| Landscove | Devon | 50.48°N 03.73°W | SX7766 |
| Land's End | Cornwall | 50.06°N 05.70°W | SW347247 |
| Landshipping | Pembrokeshire | 51.76°N 04.88°W | SN0111 |
| Landshipping Quay | Pembrokeshire | 51.75°N 04.89°W | SN0010 |
| Landslow Green | Tameside | 53.47°N 02.01°W | SJ9997 |
| Landulph | Cornwall | 50.42°N 04.21°W | SX4361 |
| Landwade | Suffolk | 52.28°N 00.37°E | TL6268 |
| Landywood | Staffordshire | 52.65°N 02.01°W | SJ9906 |
| Lane | Cornwall | 50.39°N 05.06°W | SW8260 |
| Lane | Kirklees | 53.54°N 01.84°W | SE103055 |
| Laneast | Cornwall | 50.61°N 04.51°W | SX2283 |
| Lane Bottom | Bradford | 53.81°N 01.92°W | SE0535 |
| Lane Bottom | Lancashire | 53.81°N 02.19°W | SD8735 |
| Lane End | Bradford | 53.83°N 01.97°W | SE0238 |
| Lane End | Buckinghamshire | 51.62°N 00.84°W | SU8092 |
| Lane End | Cumbria | 54.32°N 03.38°W | SD1093 |
| Lane End | Derbyshire | 53.14°N 01.34°W | SK4461 |
| Lane End | Devon | 50.77°N 04.22°W | SS4300 |
| Lane End | Dorset | 50.72°N 02.22°W | SY8492 |
| Lane End | Flintshire | 53.15°N 03.07°W | SJ2863 |
| Lane End (Cheriton) | Hampshire | 51.02°N 01.21°W | SU5525 |
| Lane End (West Tisted) | Hampshire | 51.05°N 01.04°W | SU6729 |
| Lane End | Herefordshire | 51.86°N 02.52°W | SO6419 |
| Lane End | Isle of Wight | 50.67°N 01.08°W | SZ6587 |
| Lane End | Kent | 51.412°N 00.251°E | TQ566716 |
| Lane End | Lancashire | 53.91°N 02.19°W | SD8747 |
| Lane End | Sheffield | 53.46°N 01.47°W | SK3596 |
| Lane End | Surrey | 51.16°N 00.79°W | SU8441 |
| Lane End | Wiltshire | 51.20°N 02.27°W | ST8145 |
| Lane-end | Cornwall | 50.48°N 04.77°W | SX0369 |
| Lane Ends (Disley) | Cheshire | 53.34°N 02.03°W | SJ9883 |
| Lane Ends (Warmingham) | Cheshire | 53.12°N 02.44°W | SJ7059 |
| Lane Ends | City of Stoke-on-Trent | 53.08°N 02.19°W | SJ8754 |
| Lane Ends | Cumbria | 54.24°N 03.01°W | SD3484 |
| Lane Ends (Crich) | Derbyshire | 53.08°N 01.47°W | SK3554 |
| Lane Ends (Osleston and Thurvaston) | Derbyshire | 52.90°N 01.65°W | SK2334 |
| Lane Ends (Grindleton) | Lancashire | 53.94°N 02.38°W | SD7550 |
| Lane Ends (Hapton) | Lancashire | 53.76°N 02.32°W | SD7930 |
| Lane Ends (Heath Charnock) | Lancashire | 53.63°N 02.59°W | SD6115 |
| Lane Ends | Leeds | 53.84°N 01.66°W | SE2239 |
| Lane Ends | North Yorkshire | 53.88°N 02.03°W | SD9843 |
| Lane Ends | Stockport | 53.40°N 02.04°W | SJ9790 |
| Lane Green | Staffordshire | 52.62°N 02.17°W | SJ8803 |
| Laneham | Nottinghamshire | 53.27°N 00.80°W | SK8076 |
| Lanehead | Durham | 54.76°N 02.25°W | NY8441 |
| Lanehead | Northumberland | 55.15°N 02.33°W | NY7985 |
| Lane Head | Derbyshire | 53.28°N 01.76°W | SK1676 |
| Lane Head (Shepley, Kirkburton) | Kirklees | 53.56°N 01.71°W | SE1908 |
| Lane Head (Kirkburton village) | Kirklees | 53.60°N 01.69°W | SE2012 |
| Lane Head | Pembrokeshire | 51.69°N 04.89°W | SN0004 |
| Lane Head | Walsall | 52.59°N 02.04°W | SJ9700 |
| Lane Head | Wigan | 53.45°N 02.57°W | SJ6296 |
| Lane Heads | Lancashire | 53.84°N 02.86°W | SD4339 |
| Lanehouse | Dorset | 50.60°N 02.49°W | SY6578 |
| Lanercost | Cumbria | 54.96°N 02.70°W | NY5563 |
| Lanescot | Cornwall | 50.36°N 04.70°W | SX0855 |
| Lane's End | Shropshire | 52.41°N 02.54°W | SO6380 |
| Lanesend | Pembrokeshire | 51.71°N 04.79°W | SN0706 |
| Lanes End | Buckinghamshire | 51.75°N 00.69°W | SP9007 |
| Lanesfield | Wolverhampton | 52.55°N 02.11°W | SO9295 |
| Laneshaw Bridge | Lancashire | 53.85°N 02.12°W | SD9240 |
| Lane Side | Lancashire | 53.69°N 02.33°W | SD7822 |
| Laney Green | Staffordshire | 52.65°N 02.06°W | SJ9606 |

=== Lang–Lanz ===
| Location | Locality | Coordinates (links to map & photo sources) | OS grid reference |
|---|---|---|---|
| Langa | Shetland Islands | 60.13°N 01.33°W | HU371392 |
| Langaford | Devon | 50.76°N 04.25°W | SX4199 |
| Langage | Devon | 50.36°N 04.02°W | SX5654 |
| Langal | Highland | 56.75°N 05.76°W | NM7069 |
| Langaller | Somerset | 51.02°N 03.05°W | ST2626 |
| Langar | Nottinghamshire | 52.89°N 00.93°W | SK7234 |
| Langbank | Renfrewshire | 55.92°N 04.59°W | NS3873 |
| Langbar | North Yorkshire | 53.95°N 01.86°W | SE0951 |
| Langbaurgh | North Yorkshire | 54.49°N 01.15°W | NZ5511 |
| Langcliffe | North Yorkshire | 54.08°N 02.27°W | SD8265 |
| Langdon Beck | Durham | 54.67°N 02.23°W | NY8531 |
| Langdon Hills | Essex | 51.55°N 00.40°E | TQ6787 |
| Langdown | Hampshire | 50.85°N 01.40°W | SU4206 |
| Langenhoe | Essex | 51.82°N 00.90°E | TM0018 |
| Langford | Bedfordshire | 52.04°N 00.28°W | TL1840 |
| Langford (Cullompton) | Devon | 50.80°N 03.39°W | ST0202 |
| Langford (Newton St Cyres) | Devon | 50.76°N 03.56°W | SX9097 |
| Langford | Essex | 51.75°N 00.64°E | TL8309 |
| Langford | Nottinghamshire | 53.11°N 00.77°W | SK8258 |
| Langford | Oxfordshire | 51.71°N 01.65°W | SP2402 |
| Langford (Norton Fitzwarren) | Somerset | 51.02°N 03.14°W | ST2026 |
| Langford Budville | Somerset | 50.99°N 03.26°W | ST1122 |
| Langford Green | Devon | 50.80°N 03.37°W | ST0302 |
| Langford Green | North Somerset | 51.32°N 02.76°W | ST4759 |
| Langham | Dorset | 51.02°N 02.32°W | ST7725 |
| Langham | Essex | 51.94°N 00.93°E | TM0231 |
| Langham | Norfolk | 52.92°N 00.97°E | TG0041 |
| Langham | Rutland | 52.69°N 00.75°W | SK8411 |
| Langham | Somerset | 50.88°N 02.96°W | ST3210 |
| Langham | Suffolk | 52.28°N 00.88°E | TL9769 |
| Langhaugh | Scottish Borders | 55.56°N 03.27°W | NT2031 |
| Langho | Lancashire | 53.80°N 02.45°W | SD7034 |
| Langholm | Dumfries and Galloway | 55.14°N 03.00°W | NY3684 |
| Langholme | Nottinghamshire | 53.46°N 00.87°W | SK7597 |
| Langhope | Scottish Borders | 55.47°N 02.91°W | NT4220 |
| Langland | Swansea | 51.56°N 04.02°W | SS6087 |
| Langlee | Scottish Borders | 55.60°N 02.77°W | NT5135 |
| Langlee Mains | Scottish Borders | 55.61°N 02.77°W | NT5136 |
| Langlees | Falkirk | 56.01°N 03.78°W | NS8982 |
| Langley | Berkshire | 51.50°N 00.56°W | TQ0079 |
| Langley | Cheshire | 53.23°N 02.09°W | SJ9471 |
| Langley | Derbyshire | 53.00°N 01.34°W | SK4446 |
| Langley | Essex | 51.98°N 00.09°E | TL4434 |
| Langley | Gloucestershire | 51.95°N 02.00°W | SP0028 |
| Langley (Rogate) | Hampshire | 51.05°N 00.85°W | SU8029 |
| Langley (Blackfield) | Hampshire | 50.79°N 01.37°W | SU4400 |
| Langley | Hertfordshire | 51.88°N 00.24°W | TL2122 |
| Langley | Kent | 51.22°N 00.59°E | TQ8151 |
| Langley | Northumberland | 54.94°N 02.28°W | NY8261 |
| Langley | Oxfordshire | 51.83°N 01.56°W | SP3015 |
| Langley | Rochdale | 53.55°N 02.21°W | SD8606 |
| Langley | Sandwell | 52.49°N 02.01°W | SO9988 |
| Langley | Somerset | 51.04°N 03.31°W | ST0828 |
| Langley | Warwickshire | 52.25°N 01.72°W | SP1962 |
| Langley Burrell | Wiltshire | 51.47°N 02.10°W | ST9375 |
| Langleybury | Hertfordshire | 51.68°N 00.45°W | TL0700 |
| Langley Common | Berkshire | 51.38°N 00.90°W | SU7666 |
| Langley Common | Derbyshire | 52.92°N 01.56°W | SK2937 |
| Langley Corner | Buckinghamshire | 51.54°N 00.54°W | TQ0184 |
| Langley Green | Derbyshire | 52.93°N 01.59°W | SK2738 |
| Langley Green | Essex | 51.85°N 00.71°E | TL8721 |
| Langley Green | Sandwell | 52.48°N 02.01°W | SO9987 |
| Langley Green | Warwickshire | 52.25°N 01.72°W | SP1962 |
| Langley Green | West Sussex | 51.12°N 00.20°W | TQ2638 |
| Langley Heath | Kent | 51.22°N 00.59°E | TQ8151 |
| Langley Marsh | Somerset | 51.05°N 03.32°W | ST0729 |
| Langley Mill | Derbyshire | 53.01°N 01.34°W | SK4447 |
| Langley Moor | Durham | 54.75°N 01.61°W | NZ2540 |
| Langley Park | Durham | 54.79°N 01.67°W | NZ2144 |
| Langley Street | Norfolk | 52.55°N 01.48°E | TG3601 |
| Langley Vale | Surrey | 51.29°N 00.26°W | TQ2157 |
| Langloan | North Lanarkshire | 55.85°N 04.04°W | NS7264 |
| Langney | East Sussex | 50.79°N 00.29°E | TQ6202 |
| Langold | Nottinghamshire | 53.37°N 01.12°W | SK5887 |
| Langore | Cornwall | 50.64°N 04.42°W | SX2986 |
| Langport | Somerset | 51.03°N 02.82°W | ST4226 |
| Langrick | Lincolnshire | 53.01°N 00.12°W | TF2648 |
| Langrick Bridge | Lincolnshire | 53.00°N 00.12°W | TF2647 |
| Langridge | Bath and North East Somerset | 51.41°N 02.37°W | ST7469 |
| Langridgeford | Devon | 50.97°N 04.03°W | SS5722 |
| Langrigg (Bromfield) | Cumbria | 54.79°N 03.30°W | NY1645 |
| Langrigg (Musgrave) | Cumbria | 54.52°N 02.37°W | NY7614 |
| Langrish | Hampshire | 51.00°N 01.00°W | SU7023 |
| Langsett | Sheffield | 53.49°N 01.68°W | SE2100 |
| Langshaw | Scottish Borders | 55.64°N 02.78°W | NT5139 |
| Langside | City of Glasgow | 55.82°N 04.28°W | NS5761 |
| Langstone | City of Newport | 51.60°N 02.91°W | ST3790 |
| Langstone | Devon | 50.62°N 03.78°W | SX7482 |
| Langstone | Hampshire | 50.84°N 00.99°W | SU7105 |
| Langthorne | North Yorkshire | 54.31°N 01.61°W | SE2591 |
| Langthorpe | North Yorkshire | 54.09°N 01.42°W | SE3867 |
| Langthwaite | North Yorkshire | 54.41°N 02.00°W | NZ0002 |
| Langtoft | East Riding of Yorkshire | 54.08°N 00.45°W | TA0166 |
| Langtoft | Lincolnshire | 52.69°N 00.34°W | TF1212 |
| Langton | Durham | 54.56°N 01.75°W | NZ1619 |
| Langton (near Horncastle) | Lincolnshire | 53.19°N 00.16°W | TF2368 |
| Langton (Langton by Spilsby) | Lincolnshire | 53.20°N 00.08°E | TF3970 |
| Langton | North Yorkshire | 54.09°N 00.79°W | SE7967 |
| Langton by Wragby | Lincolnshire | 53.26°N 00.29°W | TF1476 |
| Langton Green | Kent | 51.12°N 00.19°E | TQ5439 |
| Langton Green | Suffolk | 52.32°N 01.13°E | TM1474 |
| Langton Herring | Dorset | 50.63°N 02.55°W | SY6182 |
| Langton Long Blandford | Dorset | 50.84°N 02.15°W | ST8905 |
| Langton Matravers | Dorset | 50.60°N 02.01°W | SY9978 |
| Langtree | Devon | 50.91°N 04.20°W | SS4515 |
| Langtree Week | Devon | 50.91°N 04.17°W | SS4715 |
| Langwathby | Cumbria | 54.69°N 02.68°W | NY5633 |
| Langwith | Derbyshire | 53.21°N 01.22°W | SK5269 |
| Langwith Junction | Derbyshire | 53.20°N 01.22°W | SK5268 |
| Langworth | Lincolnshire | 53.27°N 00.42°W | TF0576 |
| Lanham Green | Essex | 51.85°N 00.59°E | TL7921 |
| Lanivet | Cornwall | 50.44°N 04.77°W | SX0364 |
| Lanjeth | Cornwall | 50.33°N 04.85°W | SW9752 |
| Lanjew | Cornwall | 50.44°N 04.84°W | SW9864 |
| Lank | Cornwall | 50.54°N 04.71°W | SX0875 |
| Lanlivery | Cornwall | 50.39°N 04.71°W | SX0759 |
| Lanner | Cornwall | 50.20°N 05.21°W | SW7139 |
| Lanreath | Cornwall | 50.37°N 04.56°W | SX1856 |
| Lansallos | Cornwall | 50.33°N 04.57°W | SX1751 |
| Lansbury Park | Caerphilly | 51.57°N 03.21°W | ST1687 |
| Lansdown (Bath suburb) | Bath and North East Somerset | 51.39°N 02.37°W | ST7466 |
| Lansdown (Charlcombe, near Bath) | Bath and North East Somerset | 51.41°N 02.40°W | ST7268 |
| Lansdown | Gloucestershire | 51.88°N 02.10°W | SO9321 |
| Lanteglos-by-Camelford | Cornwall | 50.60°N 04.71°W | SX0882 |
| Lanteglos Highway | Cornwall | 50.34°N 04.61°W | SX1453 |
| Lanton | Scottish Borders | 55.48°N 02.60°W | NT6221 |
| Lantuel | Cornwall | 50.46°N 04.86°W | SW9767 |
| Lantyan | Cornwall | 50.38°N 04.67°W | SX1057 |

=== Lap–Laz ===
| Location | Locality | Coordinates (links to map & photo sources) | OS grid reference |
|---|---|---|---|
| Lapal | Dudley | 52.44°N 02.03°W | SO9883 |
| Lapford | Devon | 50.85°N 03.80°W | SS7308 |
| Lapford Cross | Devon | 50.84°N 03.81°W | SS7207 |
| Laphroaig | Argyll and Bute | 55.62°N 06.16°W | NR3845 |
| Lapley | Staffordshire | 52.70°N 02.19°W | SJ8712 |
| Lapworth | Warwickshire | 52.33°N 01.76°W | SP1671 |
| Larbert | Falkirk | 56.01°N 03.83°W | NS8682 |
| Larbreck | Lancashire | 53.85°N 02.91°W | SD4040 |
| Larches | Lancashire | 53.76°N 02.76°W | SD5030 |
| Larden Green | Cheshire | 53.05°N 02.62°W | SJ5851 |
| Largie | Aberdeenshire | 57.36°N 02.65°W | NJ6131 |
| Largiemore | Argyll and Bute | 56.02°N 05.30°W | NR9486 |
| Largoward | Fife | 56.25°N 02.87°W | NO4607 |
| Largs | North Ayrshire | 55.79°N 04.87°W | NS2059 |
| Largue | Aberdeenshire | 57.45°N 02.61°W | NJ6341 |
| Largybeg | North Ayrshire | 55.46°N 05.08°W | NS0523 |
| Largymeanoch | North Ayrshire | 55.47°N 05.10°W | NS0424 |
| Largymore | North Ayrshire | 55.47°N 05.10°W | NS0424 |
| Larkbeare | Devon | 50.76°N 03.33°W | SY0697 |
| Larkfield | Inverclyde | 55.93°N 04.83°W | NS2375 |
| Larkfield | Kent | 51.29°N 00.43°E | TQ7058 |
| Larkfield | Leeds | 53.84°N 01.68°W | SE2139 |
| Larkhall | Bath and North East Somerset | 51.39°N 02.36°W | ST7566 |
| Larkhall | South Lanarkshire | 55.72°N 03.97°W | NS7650 |
| Larkhill | Wiltshire | 51.19°N 01.82°W | SU1244 |
| Lark Hill | Wigan | 53.49°N 02.46°W | SD6900 |
| Larklands | Derbyshire | 52.96°N 01.30°W | SK4741 |
| Larks' Hill | Suffolk | 52.09°N 01.19°E | TM1949 |
| Larling | Norfolk | 52.46°N 00.91°E | TL9889 |
| Larport | Herefordshire | 52.03°N 02.62°W | SO5738 |
| Larrick | Cornwall | 50.57°N 04.40°W | SX3078 |
| Larriston | Scottish Borders | 55.23°N 02.72°W | NY5494 |
| Lartington | Durham | 54.54°N 01.98°W | NZ0117 |
| Lasborough | Gloucestershire | 51.64°N 02.26°W | ST8294 |
| Lasham | Hampshire | 51.17°N 01.04°W | SU6742 |
| Lashenden | Kent | 51.12°N 00.62°E | TQ8440 |
| Lask Edge | Staffordshire | 53.10°N 02.13°W | SJ9156 |
| Lassodie | Fife | 56.11°N 03.41°W | NT1292 |
| Lastingham | North Yorkshire | 54.30°N 00.89°W | SE7290 |
| Latcham | Somerset | 51.21°N 02.80°W | ST4447 |
| Latchbrook | Cornwall | 50.40°N 04.25°W | SX4059 |
| Latchford | Cheshire | 53.37°N 02.58°W | SJ6187 |
| Latchford | Hertfordshire | 51.86°N 00.01°E | TL3920 |
| Latchford | Oxfordshire | 51.70°N 01.06°W | SP6501 |
| Latchingdon | Essex | 51.66°N 00.71°E | TL8800 |
| Latchley | Cornwall | 50.53°N 04.25°W | SX4073 |
| Latchmere Green | Hampshire | 51.33°N 01.09°W | SU6360 |
| Latchmore Bank | Hertfordshire | 51.84°N 00.16°E | TL4918 |
| Lately Common | Wigan | 53.47°N 02.51°W | SJ6698 |
| Lathbury | Milton Keynes | 52.09°N 00.73°W | SP8745 |
| Latheron | Highland | 58.27°N 03.38°W | ND1933 |
| Latheronwheel | Highland | 58.26°N 03.38°W | ND1932 |
| Lathom | Lancashire | 53.58°N 02.83°W | SD4510 |
| Lathones | Fife | 56.26°N 02.85°W | NO4708 |
| Latimer | Buckinghamshire | 51.68°N 00.55°W | TQ0099 |
| Latteridge | South Gloucestershire | 51.55°N 02.49°W | ST6684 |
| Lattiford | Somerset | 51.03°N 02.44°W | ST6926 |
| Lattinford Hill | Suffolk | 51.98°N 01.01°E | TM0736 |
| Latton | Wiltshire | 51.65°N 01.87°W | SU0995 |
| Latton Bush | Essex | 51.75°N 00.11°E | TL4608 |
| Lauder | Scottish Borders | 55.71°N 02.76°W | NT5247 |
| Lauder Barns | Scottish Borders | 55.70°N 02.73°W | NT5446 |
| Laugharne | Carmarthenshire | 51.76°N 04.46°W | SN3010 |
| Laughern Hill | Worcestershire | 52.22°N 02.33°W | SO7758 |
| Laughterton | Lincolnshire | 53.26°N 00.75°W | SK8375 |
| Laughton | East Sussex | 50.89°N 00.13°E | TQ5013 |
| Laughton | Leicestershire | 52.49°N 01.04°W | SP6589 |
| Laughton (West Lindsey) | Lincolnshire | 53.46°N 00.73°W | SK8497 |
| Laughton (South Kesteven) | Lincolnshire | 52.86°N 00.41°W | TF0731 |
| Laughton Common | East Sussex | 50.90°N 00.11°E | TQ4914 |
| Laughton Common | Rotherham | 53.37°N 01.23°W | SK5187 |
| Laughton en le Morthen | Rotherham | 53.38°N 01.21°W | SK5288 |
| Launcells Cross | Cornwall | 50.82°N 04.47°W | SS2606 |
| Launceston | Cornwall | 50.63°N 04.36°W | SX3384 |
| Launcherley | Somerset | 51.18°N 02.65°W | ST5443 |
| Laund | Lancashire | 53.70°N 02.30°W | SD8023 |
| Launton | Oxfordshire | 51.89°N 01.12°W | SP6022 |
| Laurencekirk | Aberdeenshire | 56.83°N 02.47°W | NO7171 |
| Laurieston | Dumfries and Galloway | 54.95°N 04.06°W | NX6864 |
| Laurieston | Falkirk | 55.99°N 03.76°W | NS9079 |
| Lavendon | Milton Keynes | 52.16°N 00.67°W | SP9153 |
| Lavenham | Suffolk | 52.10°N 00.78°E | TL9149 |
| Laverlaw | Scottish Borders | 55.62°N 03.12°W | NT2937 |
| Laverley | Somerset | 51.14°N 02.63°W | ST5639 |
| Lavernock | The Vale Of Glamorgan | 51.40°N 03.18°W | ST1868 |
| Laversdale | Cumbria | 54.95°N 02.82°W | NY4762 |
| Laverstock | Wiltshire | 51.06°N 01.78°W | SU1530 |
| Laverstoke | Hampshire | 51.22°N 01.29°W | SU4948 |
| Laverton | Gloucestershire | 52.01°N 01.89°W | SP0735 |
| Laverton | North Yorkshire | 54.15°N 01.66°W | SE2273 |
| Laverton | Somerset | 51.27°N 02.33°W | ST7753 |
| Lavington Sands | Wiltshire | 51.29°N 02.00°W | SU0055 |
| Lavister | Wrexham | 53.11°N 02.94°W | SJ3758 |
| Lavrean | Cornwall | 50.38°N 04.77°W | SX0358 |
| Law | South Lanarkshire | 55.74°N 03.88°W | NS8252 |
| Lawers (Loch Tay) | Perth and Kinross | 56.52°N 04.16°W | NN6739 |
| Lawers (near Comrie) | Perth and Kinross | 56.37°N 03.96°W | NN7922 |
| Lawford | Essex | 51.93°N 01.03°E | TM0931 |
| Lawford | Somerset | 51.11°N 03.24°W | ST1336 |
| Lawford Heath | Warwickshire | 52.35°N 01.34°W | SP4573 |
| Law Hill | South Lanarkshire | 55.73°N 03.88°W | NS8251 |
| Lawhitton | Cornwall | 50.61°N 04.33°W | SX3582 |
| Lawkland | North Yorkshire | 54.08°N 02.35°W | SD7766 |
| Lawkland Green | North Yorkshire | 54.08°N 02.33°W | SD7865 |
| Lawley | Shropshire | 52.66°N 02.48°W | SJ6708 |
| Lawn | Swindon | 51.54°N 01.77°W | SU1683 |
| Lawnhead | Staffordshire | 52.81°N 02.25°W | SJ8324 |
| Lawns | Wakefield | 53.71°N 01.53°W | SE3124 |
| Lawnswood | Leeds | 53.83°N 01.60°W | SE2638 |
| Lawnt | Denbighshire | 53.17°N 03.43°W | SJ0465 |
| Lawrence Hill | City of Newport | 51.58°N 02.95°W | ST3488 |
| Lawrence Weston | City of Bristol | 51.49°N 02.66°W | ST5478 |
| Lawrenny | Pembrokeshire | 51.72°N 04.88°W | SN0107 |
| Lawrenny Quay | Pembrokeshire | 51.71°N 04.88°W | SN0106 |
| Lawshall | Suffolk | 52.15°N 00.71°E | TL8654 |
| Lawshall Green | Suffolk | 52.14°N 00.73°E | TL8753 |
| Lawton | Herefordshire | 52.22°N 02.82°W | SO4459 |
| Lawton | Shropshire | 52.44°N 02.72°W | SO5183 |
| Lawton-gate | Cheshire | 53.10°N 02.30°W | SJ8056 |
| Lawton Heath End | Cheshire | 53.10°N 02.31°W | SJ7956 |
| Laxey | Isle of Man | 54.22°N 04.41°W | SC4384 |
| Laxfield | Suffolk | 52.29°N 01.35°E | TM2972 |
| Laxfirth | Shetland Islands | 60.31°N 01.15°W | HU4759 |
| Laxford | Highland | 58.37°N 05.03°W | NC225473 |
| Laxo | Shetland Islands | 60.34°N 01.20°W | HU4463 |
| Laxobigging | Shetland Islands | 60.43°N 01.25°W | HU4173 |
| Laxton | East Riding of Yorkshire | 53.71°N 00.80°W | SE7925 |
| Laxton | Northamptonshire | 52.55°N 00.61°W | SP9496 |
| Laxton | Nottinghamshire | 53.19°N 00.92°W | SK7267 |
| Laycock | Bradford | 53.85°N 01.95°W | SE0340 |
| Layer Breton | Essex | 51.82°N 00.81°E | TL9418 |
| Layer de la Haye | Essex | 51.84°N 00.85°E | TL9720 |
| Layer Marney | Essex | 51.81°N 00.78°E | TL9217 |
| Layerthorpe | York | 53.95°N 01.07°W | SE6151 |
| Laymore | Dorset | 50.83°N 02.88°W | ST3804 |
| Layters Green | Buckinghamshire | 51.60°N 00.58°W | SU9890 |
| Laytham | East Riding of Yorkshire | 53.84°N 00.87°W | SE7439 |
| Layton | Lancashire | 53.81°N 03.03°W | SD3236 |
| Lazenby | Redcar and Cleveland | 54.56°N 01.11°W | NZ5719 |
| Lazonby | Cumbria | 54.74°N 02.71°W | NY5439 |
