= List of farms in Cornwall =

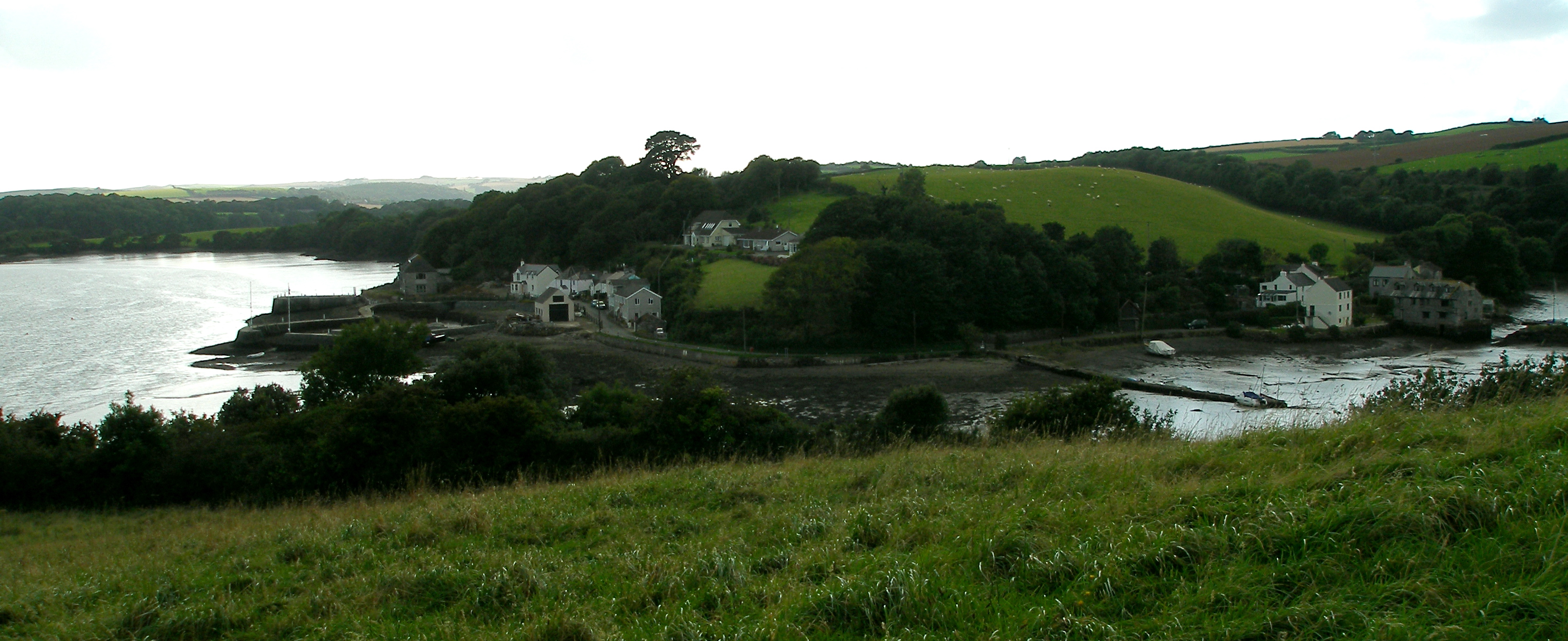
Churchtown Farm Wildlife Reserve

This is a list of farms in Cornwall. Cornwall is a ceremonial county and unitary authority area of England within the United Kingdom.

== Farms in Cornwall ==
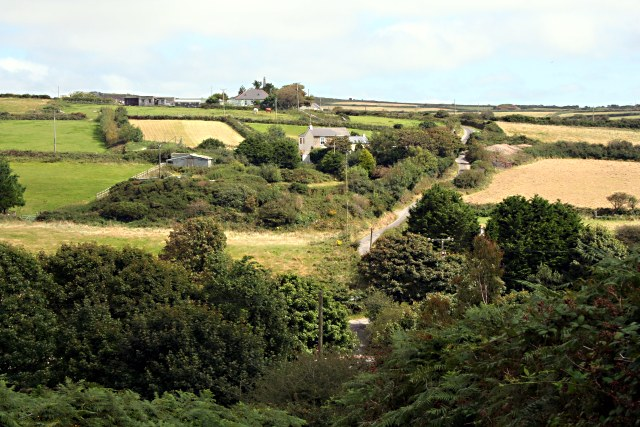
Looking over the Brea Valley to Carn Arthen

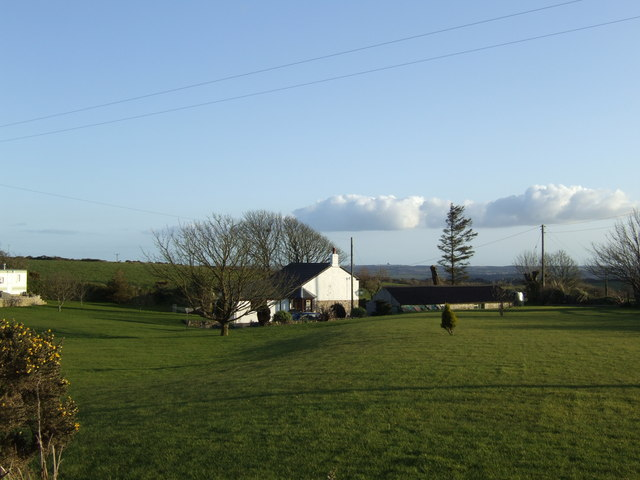
Little Carnebone

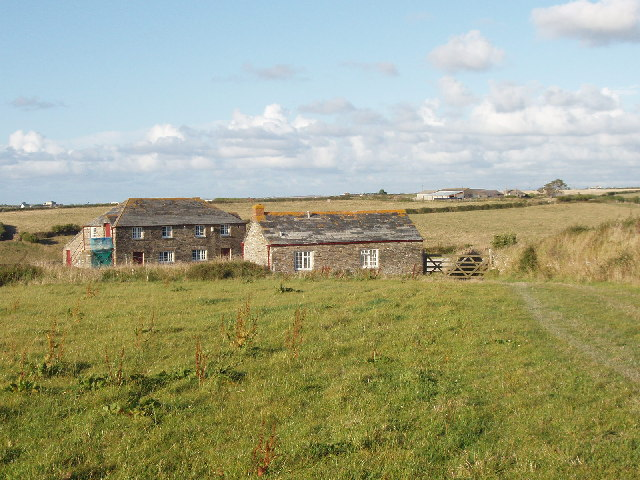
Pentire Farm

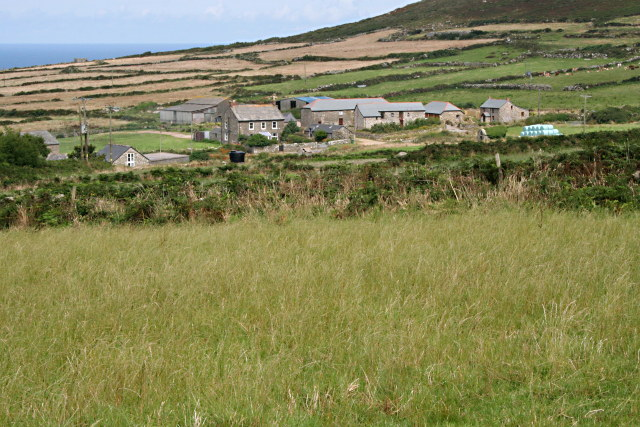
Trevowhan

- Arrallas
- Bodanna
- Bodgate
- Bodrean
- Carn Arthen
- Carnebone
- Churchtown Farm
- Cornish Cyder Farm
- Crossgate, Cornwall
- Dannonchapel
- Dizzard
- Duchy Farm
- Froxton
- Great Bosullow
- Halton Barton
- Hay, Cornwall
- Haye
- Hendra, Cornwall – the name of seven hamlets in Cornwall
- Hendraburnick
- Lanjew
- Lantuel
- Lezerea
- Lower Croan
- Mayon, Cornwall
- Menherion
- Nanceddan
- New Downs – near Camborne in Cornwall, England, UK.
- Penpoll
- Pentire, Cornwall
- Polgear
- Porthmeor
- Rescassa
- Rosevine
- Tregidden
- Tregolls
- Tregullon
- Trengale
- Trenoon
- Tresawson
- Treveal
- Trevilder
- Trevilla
- Trevowhan
- Troswell
- West Curry
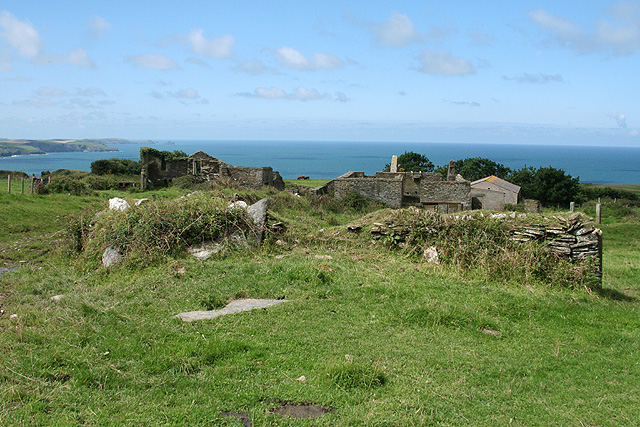
Dannonchapel

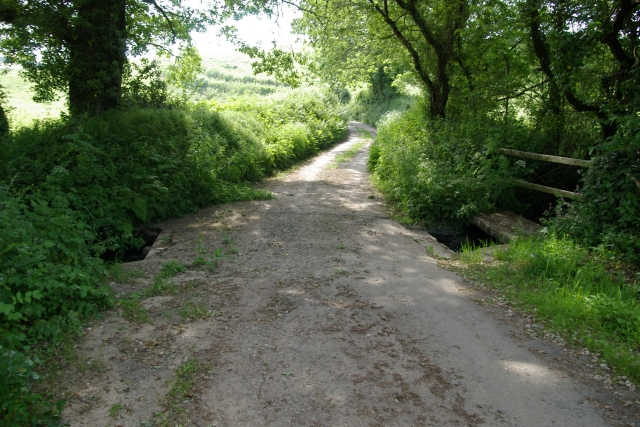
A dry ford, Hay Farm

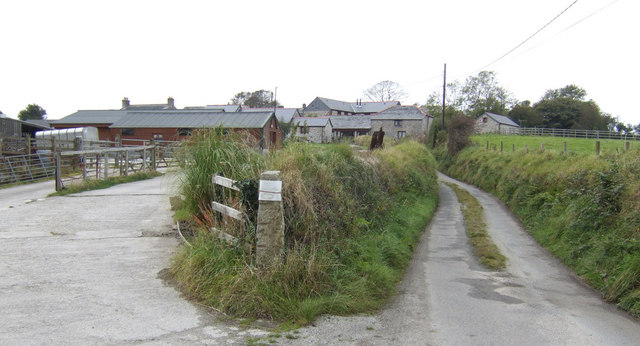
Higher Menadew Farm

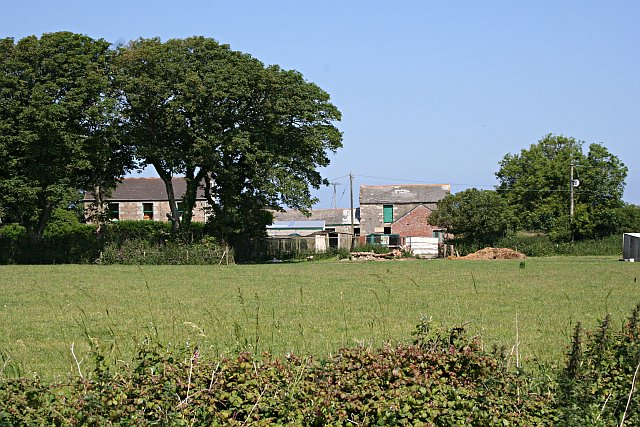
New Downs Farm

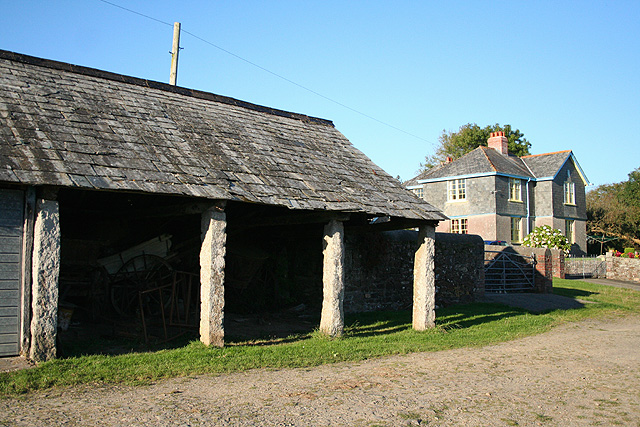
Linhay at Higher Troswell

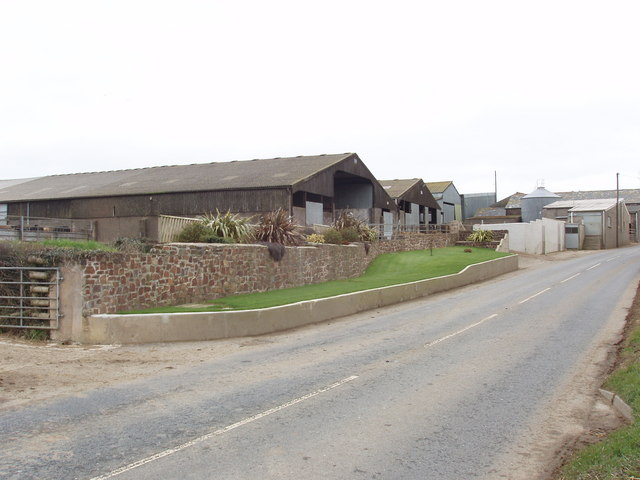
Buildings at Buttsbear Cross Farm

== See also ==
- Duchy College Rural Business School (Stoke Climsland and Rosewarne)
- List of museums in Cornwall
- List of places in Cornwall
- List of topics related to Cornwall
- List of windmills in Cornwall
- Places of Interest in Cornwall
- Visitor attractions in Cornwall
