= Buzza =

Buzza may refer to:

== People ==
- Alan Buzza (born 1966), English cricket player and rugby union player
- Nathan Buzza (born 1970), Australian entrepreneur and investor
- Wylie Buzza (born 1996), Australian rules football player

== Other ==
- Buzza Company Building, Minnesota, United States
- Buzza Tower, Isles of Scilly, United Kingdom
