= Places of interest in Cornwall =

This is a list of places of interest in Cornwall, England. Cornwall is a county on England's rugged southwestern tip. It forms a peninsula encompassing wild moorland and hundreds of sandy beaches, culminating at the promontory Land's End. The south coast, dubbed the Cornish Riviera, is home to picturesque harbour villages such as Fowey and Falmouth. The north coast is lined with towering cliffs and seaside resorts like Newquay, known for surfing.

See List of places in Cornwall for a list of settlements in the county.

== Places of interest ==
Key
| | Abbey/Priory/Cathedral |
| Accessible open space | Accessible open space |
| | Amusement/Theme Park |
| | Castle |
| Country Park | Country Park |
| | English Heritage |
| | Forestry Commission |
| Heritage railway | Heritage railway |
| Historic house | Historic House |
| Places of Worship | Places of Worship |
| Museum (free) Museum | Museum (free/not free) |
| National Trust | National Trust |
| | Theatre |
| | Zoo |

- Barbara Hepworth Museum
- Bodmin and Wenford Railway
- Bodmin Moor
- Bodmin Parish Church
- Cardinham Woods
- Carn Euny
- Carn Leskys
- Carrick Roads
- Castle An Dinas
- Cheesewring
- Chûn Castle
- Chûn Quoit
- Chysauster Ancient Village
- Commando Ridge, Bosigran
- Cornish Seal Sanctuary, Gweek
- Cotehele
- Ding Dong mines
- Eden Project
- Geevor Tin Mine
- Godrevy Island
- Goonhilly Downs
- Helston Railway Preservation Company
- The Hurlers
- Kynance Cove
- Land's End
- Lanhydrock House
- Lanyon Quoit
- Lappa Valley Steam Railway
- Levant Steam Engine
- Looe
- Looe Island
- Leach Pottery
- The Lizard
- Loe Pool
- Logan Rock
- Lost Gardens of Heligan
- Madron Well and Madron Well Chapel
- Mên-an-Tol
- Mevagissey
- Minack Theatre
- Mousehole
- Mullion Cove
- Newlyn Art Gallery
- National Maritime Museum Cornwall
- Paradise Park, Cornwall
- Pencarrow
- Pendennis Castle
- Penlee House
- Poldhu
- Polperro
- Museum of Submarine Telegraphy
- Restormel Castle
- River Fowey
- River Looe
- Roseland Peninsula
- Rough Tor
- Royal Cornwall Museum
- South Crofty
- South West Coast Path
- St Germans Priory
- St Mawes Castle
- St Michael's Mount
- Talland Bay
- Tate St. Ives
- Tehidy Country Park
- Tintagel Castle
- Trelissick Garden
- Trencrom Hill Fort
- Tresco Abbey Gardens
- Trinity House National Lighthouse Museum
- Truro Cathedral

== See also ==
- List of farms in Cornwall
- List of museums in Cornwall
- List of windmills in Cornwall
