= Bodanna =

Coordinates: 50.383°N 4.976°W

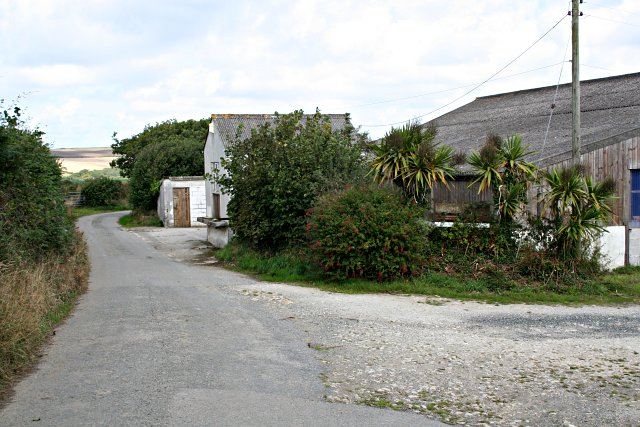
Bodanna farm

Bodanna is a farmstead in mid Cornwall, England, United Kingdom. It is situated in the civil parish of St Enoder north of the village of Summercourt about four miles (6.5 km) south-west of Newquay.

The nearest settlement is Trewinnion, half-a-mile to the south.

== See also ==
- List of farms in Cornwall
