= Polgear =

Coordinates: 50.186°N 5.240°W

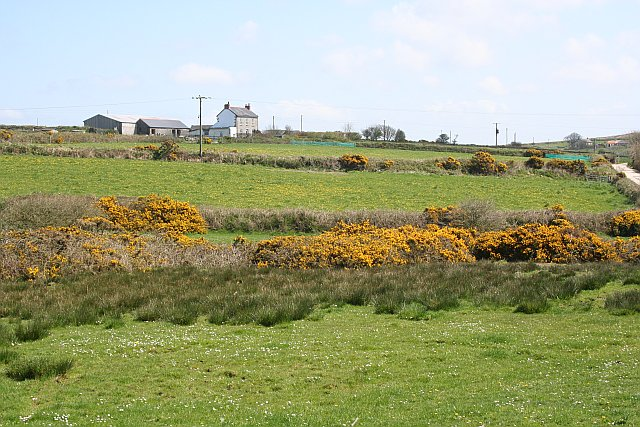
- Polgear Farm

- Location within Cornwall
- OS grid reference: SW688368
- Civil parish: Wendron
- Unitary authority: Cornwall
- Ceremonial county: Cornwall
- Region: South West
- Country: England
- Sovereign state: United Kingdom

Polgear is a group of farms south of Four Lanes in west Cornwall, England.

== See also ==
- List of farms in Cornwall
