= Menherion =

Farm and hamlet in Cornwall, England

Coordinates: 50.187°N 5.216°W

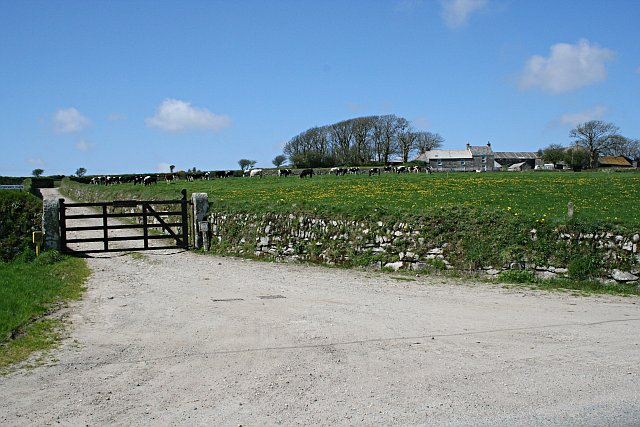
- Menherion

- Location within Cornwall
- OS grid reference: SW705368
- Civil parish: Stithians
- Unitary authority: Cornwall
- Ceremonial county: Cornwall
- Region: South West
- Country: England
- Sovereign state: United Kingdom

Menherion is a farm in the parish of Stithians in Cornwall, England. Menherion is west of Stithians churchtown. Menherion is also the name of a hamlet in Cornwall.

== See also ==
- List of farms in Cornwall
