= Churchtown Farm =

Community nature reserve in Cornwall, England

Coordinates: 50.3978°N 4.2277°W

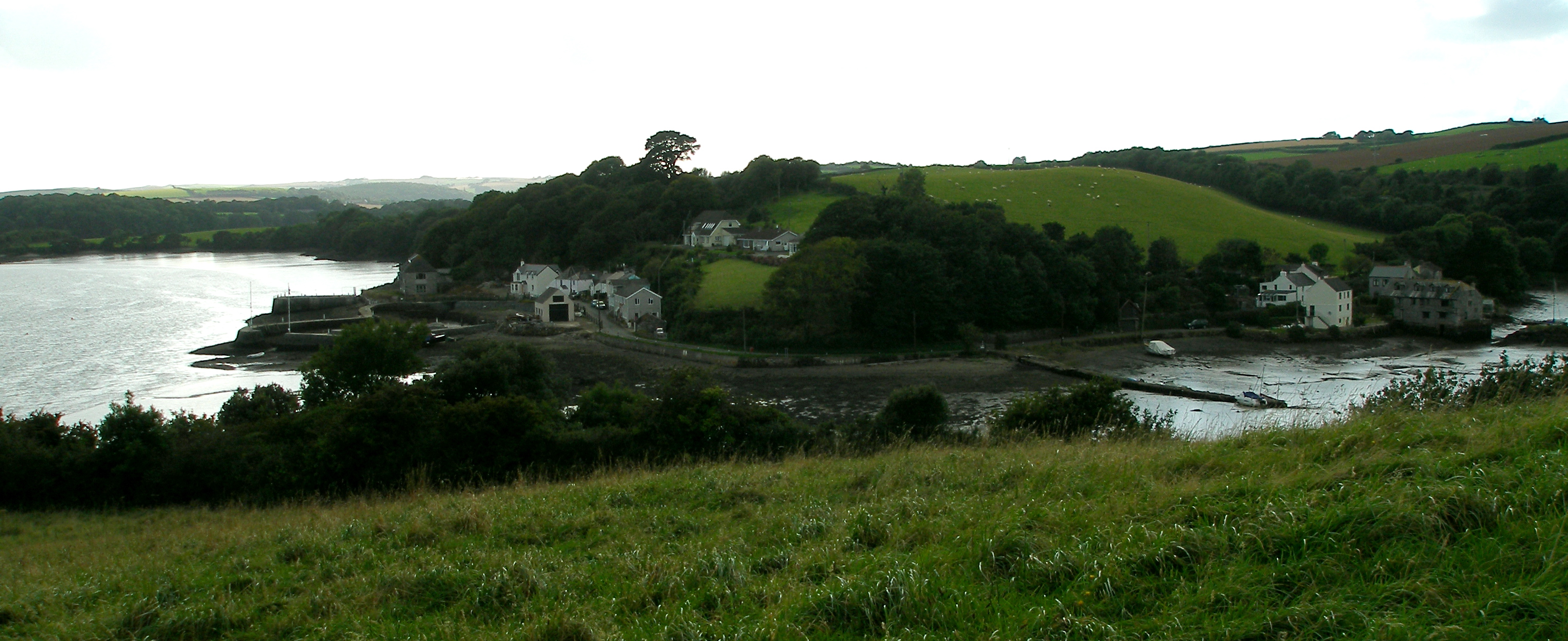
Churchtown Farm Wildlife Reserve.

Churchtown Farm is a community nature reserve one mile south of Saltash, Cornwall, England. It is leased from Antony Estate and managed by Cornwall Wildlife Trust, and includes diverse habitats such as grassland, estuarine mudflats, wetland, woodland, disused quarries and hedgerows.

Situated within the Tamar Valley AONB, and positioned between the rivers Tamar and Lynher as well as Forder Creek, the majority of the reserve is farmland. This includes hay meadows and arable fields. At 61 hectares, it is the third biggest reserve that the Cornwall Wildlife Trust owns.

The land on the reserve is being farmed in a way which reflects traditional Cornish farming, benefiting wildlife in many ways. Historically, Churchtown Farm was farmed for dairy and arable production. From the 1960s, most of the fields were intensively managed, being re-seeded with highly productive rye grass mixtures maintained by regular applications of chemical fertilisers and heavy grazing. This intensive management has artificially increased the soil nutrients and encouraged pastures with a very limited range of plant species and little structural variation. In such a field there is little insect, animal or bird life. In an attempt to encourage wildlife back to the farm, Cornwall Wildlife Trust are using a number of less intensive management techniques aimed at reducing the soil nutrient levels and increasing the number of plant species.

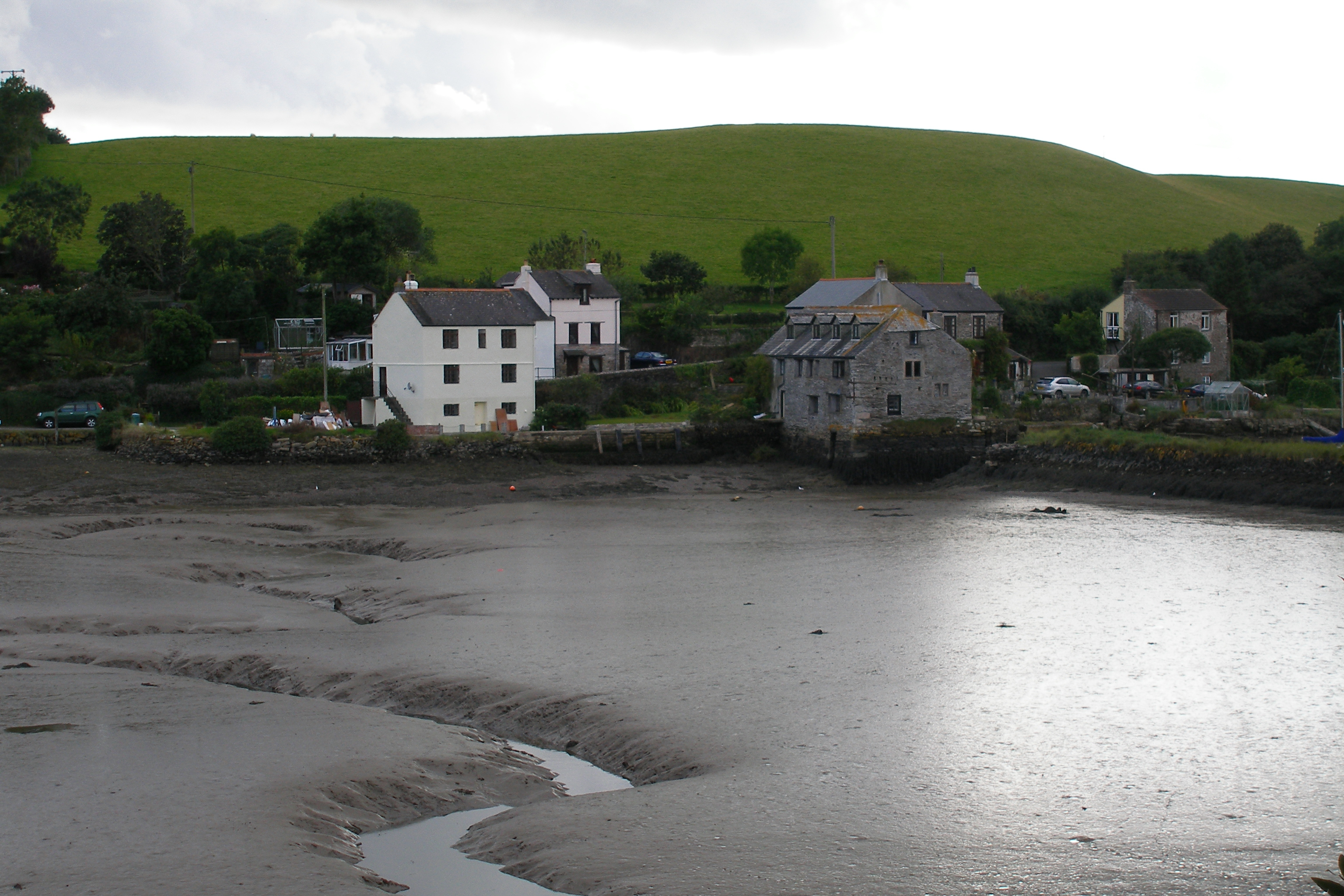
Forder Creek

The two disused quarries in the reserve, Forder and Lowhill, were quarried in the 19th century for roadstone. Lowhill closed in 1915. Hornblende-rich dolerite was quarried for use in road construction. Both quarries are now County Geology Sites.

Oystercatchers, Dunlins, Egrets, Avocets and Greenshank can all be seen on the mudflats.

== See also ==
- List of farms in Cornwall
