= Troswell =

Coordinates: 50.7009°N 4.4739°W

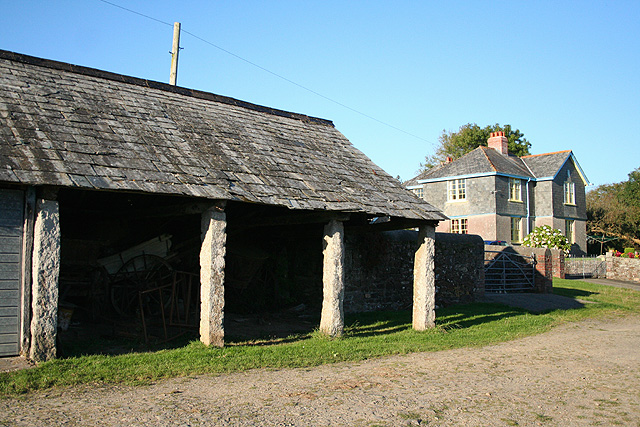
Linhay at Higher Troswell

Lower Troswell and Higher Troswell are two farms in the parish of North Petherwin, Cornwall, England, UK.

== See also ==
- List of farms in Cornwall
