= Bodgate =

Coordinates: 50.690°N 4.429°W

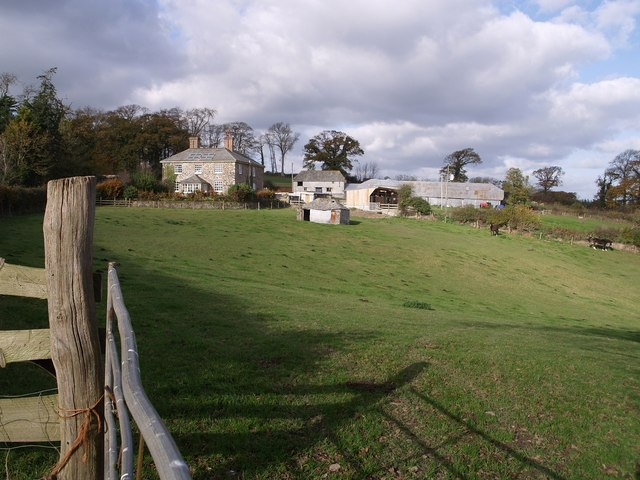
- Bodgate in 2007

General information
- Location: North Petherwin, Cornwall
- Country: England

Listed Building – Grade II
- Official name: Bodgate Farmhouse
- Designated: 11 January 1989
- Reference no.: 1310637

Listed Building – Grade II
- Official name: Stables and pound house 20 metres to north west of Bodgate Farmhouse
- Designated: 11 January 1989
- Reference no.: 1142925

Bodgate is a farmstead in east Cornwall, England, United Kingdom. It is situated in North Petherwin civil parish about 0.5 miles (0.80 km) south of North Petherwin village, five miles (8 km) north-west of Launceston. The parish was transferred from Devon to Cornwall in 1966.

== Etymology ==
The settlement was recorded as "Bodgat" in 1286. The name may have originated in Old English, but Richard Coates and Andrew Breeze tentatively suggested an origin in the Common Brittonic word bod ("settlement") or the word surviving in modern Welsh as baedd ("boar"), compounded with the word found in modern Welsh as coed ("wood").

== History ==
The settlement has long been held by the Hawke family. A 1618 transfer of land rights to a Nicholas Hawke refers to the "mansion house, barton and demesnes called Bodgate in North Petherwin" Tithe apportionments produced under the Tithe Commutation Act 1836 show the estate consisted of 326 acres c1840, held by a Richard Hawke.

Both the 19th century Bodgate farmhouse, and the nearby c. 17th century stable block are Grade II listed buildings.

== See also ==
- List of farms in Cornwall
