= Halton Barton =

Coordinates: 50.469°N 4.245°W

Halton Barton is a farm in the parish of St Dominic in Cornwall, England.

== See also ==
- List of farms in Cornwall
