= Engine house =

Building or structure that holds engines

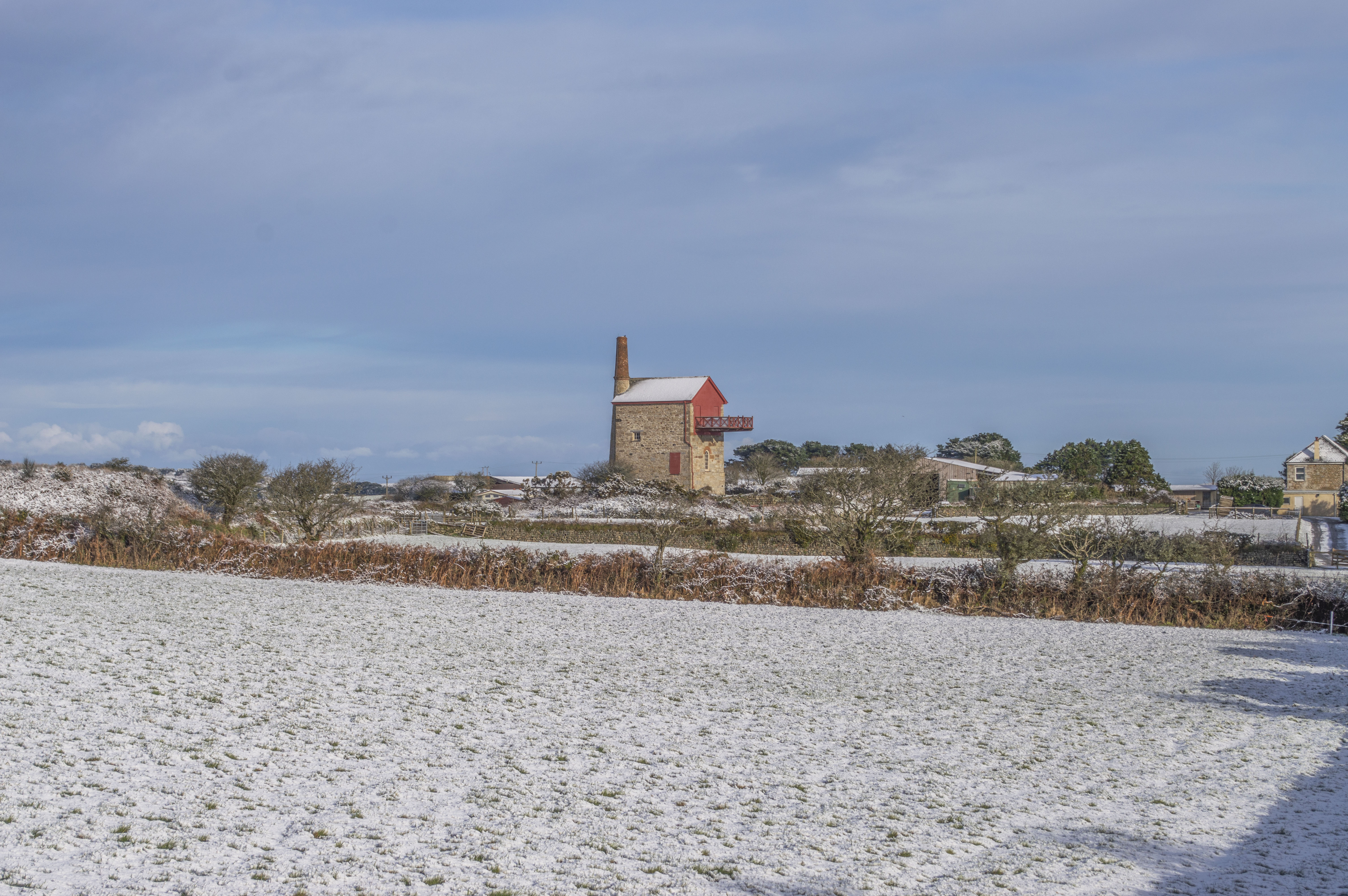
The Engine House of a Cornish tin mine (East Wheal Lovell).

An engine house is a building or other structure that holds one or more engines. It is often practical to bring engines together for common maintenance, as when train locomotives are brought together.

Types of engine houses include:

- motive power depots (MPD), where locomotives are stored and maintained
- Buildings that housed a steam engine on a mine, used for pumping, winding or stamping. Many of these have survived in Cornwall, England, for example at Crown Mines.
- Buildings that housed a pumping engine for an atmospheric railway
- House-built engines, where the engine is the house. A house-built engine is a large beam engine where the engine house itself forms the frame of the engine.

The term "engine house" is also used, widely in the United States and perhaps elsewhere, to mean:

- Fire station, which hold fire engine trucks.

== List of engine houses ==
Notable examples, not including fire stations, include:

in Australia

- More than 1,500 historic sites listed on the Victorian Heritage Register, as of September 2026

in England

- The South Devon Railway engine houses, built for Brunel's atmospheric railway
- The hydraulic engine house, Bristol Harbour, which provided power for lock gates, cranes, and other equipment
- The Tardebigge Engine House, a former canal-pumping engine house in Worcestershire, England
- Cobb's Engine House which housed a steam pump, in Rowley Regis, West Midlands, England
- "Engine House No. 2" housing the Markfield Beam Engine, Tottenham, London
- The Brunel Engine House in Rotherhithe, London, housing the Brunel Museum
- The Engine House, now a museum opened in 2008 at the Severn Valley Railway, which houses locomotives

in the United States

- Belt Railroad Engine House and Sandhouse, San Francisco, California
- Rockland Turntable and Engine House, Rockland, Maine
- Cleveland Mine Engine House Number 3, Ishpeming, Michigan
- Winona and St. Peter Engine House, Winona, Minnesota
- Gloucester City Water Works Engine House, Gloucester City, New Jersey
- Stewartstown Engine House, Stewartstown Railroad, Stewartstown, Pennsylvania

== See also ==
- List of fire stations
- List of pumping stations
