= Nanceddan =

Farm in Cornwall, England

Coordinates: 50.152°N 5.491°W

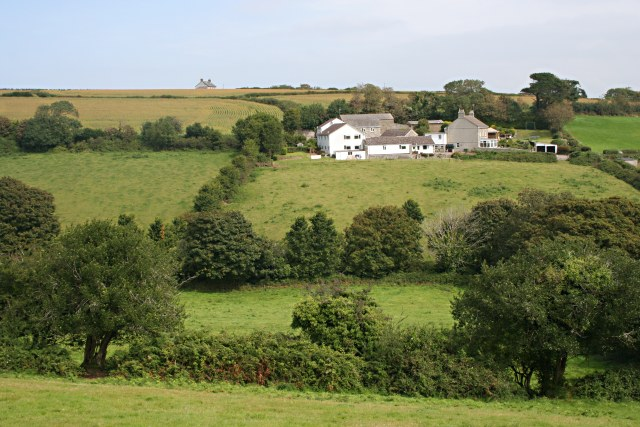
Nanceddan

Nanceddan is a farm north of Ludgvan in west Cornwall, England.

== See also ==
- List of farms in Cornwall
