= Lezerea =

Farm in Cornwall, England

Coordinates: 50.154°N 5.245°W

Lezerea: Cornish: Lysgre
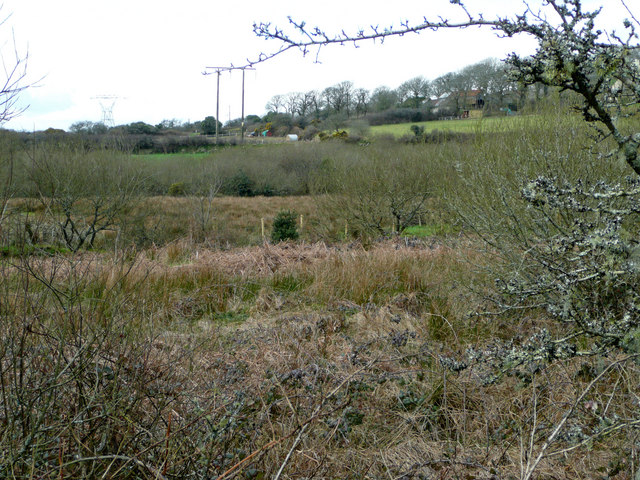
- Scrub land north of Porkellis (Lezerea Farm in the background)

- Location within Cornwall
- OS grid reference: SW683333
- Civil parish: Wendron
- Unitary authority: Cornwall
- Ceremonial county: Cornwall
- Region: South West
- Country: England
- Sovereign state: United Kingdom

Lezerea (Cornish: Lysgre, meaning herd's court) is a farmstead near Wendron in Cornwall, England, UK. Lezerea is in the civil parish of Wendron, situated approximately 7 miles (11 km) west of Falmouth.

== See also ==
- List of farms in Cornwall
