= Trevilla =

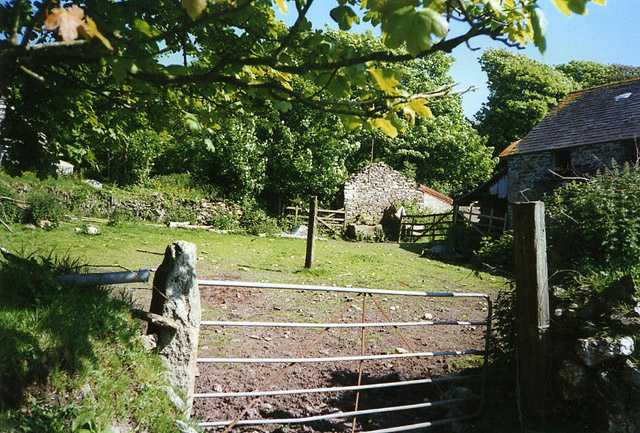
Farm buildings at Trevilla, St Juliot

Trevilla is a hamlet in the parish of Feock, Cornwall, England, United Kingdom.

Trevilla is also a farm in the parish of St Juliot, Cornwall.

== See also ==
- List of farms in Cornwall
