= Trengale =

Coordinates: 50.48174°N 4.522988°W

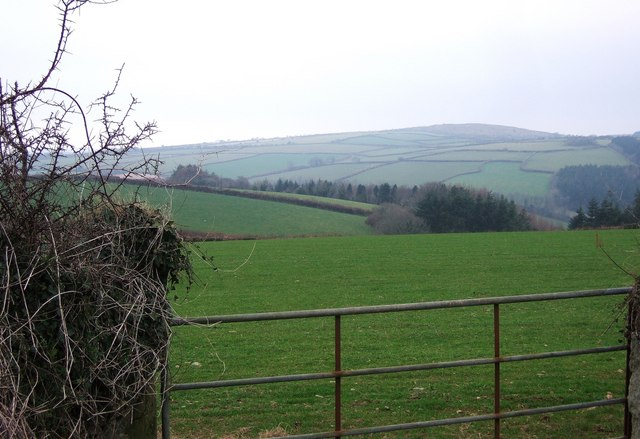
- Trengale Wood and the Fowey valley

- Location within Cornwall
- OS grid reference: SX2102667765
- Civil parish: St Cleer
- Shire county: Cornwall
- Region: South West
- Country: England
- Sovereign state: United Kingdom
- Police: Devon and Cornwall
- Fire: Cornwall
- Ambulance: South Western

Higher Trengale and Lower Trengale are two farming hamlets in the parish of St Cleer, Cornwall, England. It is located to the northwest of Liskeard. They are located between Dobwalls (to the south) and Draynes (to the north). The principal river in the area is the River Fowey, which flows to the north on the other side of Trengale Wood. Trengale is mentioned in Domesday Book. It documents a Richard holding Trengale, also referred to a Turgoil, from Saint Petroc in 1086. St Neot Lower Trengale Farm Holiday Cottages are rented out year round.

== See also ==
- List of farms in Cornwall
