= Rosevine =

Coordinates: 50.189°N 4.973°W

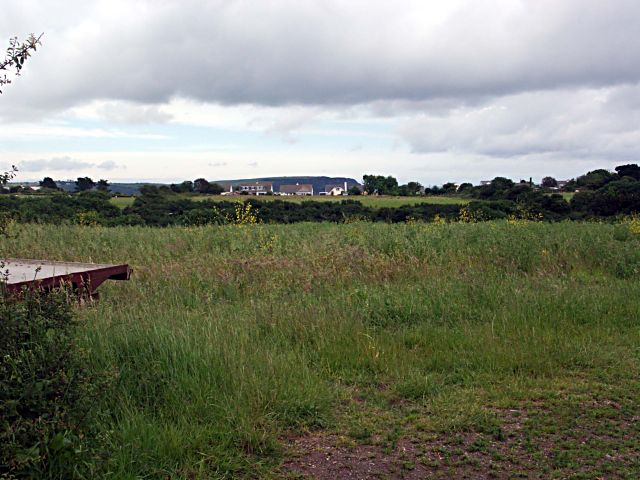
- A view across fields towards Rosevine

- Location within Cornwall
- OS grid reference: SW879363
- Unitary authority: Cornwall
- Ceremonial county: Cornwall
- Region: South West
- Country: England
- Sovereign state: United Kingdom

Rosevine is a farm in the parish of Gerrans in Cornwall, England.

== See also ==
- List of farms in Cornwall
