= Hendraburnick =

Coordinates: 50.659°N 4.650°W

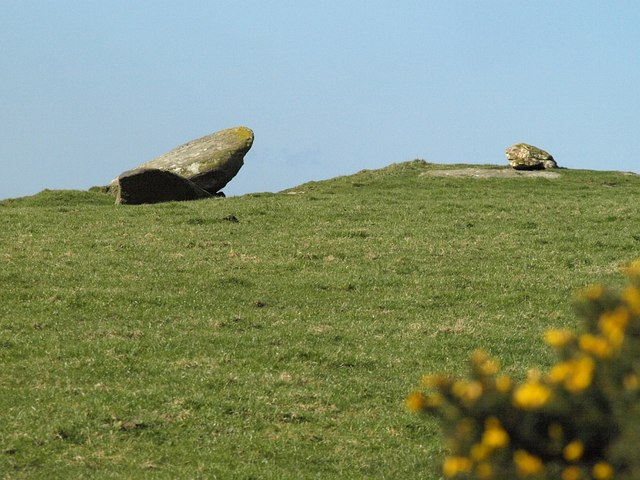
Hendraburnick Quoit

Hendraburnick (Cornish: Hendra Bronnik, meaning rushy home farm^{a}) is a farmstead near Davidstow, Cornwall, England. On Hendraburnick Down is the source of the River Camel.

In the medieval period, Hendraburnick was a manor held under Launceston Castle. Feet of fines records that in 1383 some land in the settlement of Hendraburnick was held by a Roger Knyght, reverting on his death to a John Lordman of Treleigh.

A 17th century farmhouse there is a grade II listed building.

Hendraburnick Quoit to the north east is a Late Neolithic dolmen, regarded as "the most decorated or deliberately marked stone in southern Britain".

== See also ==
- List of farms in Cornwall

== Notes ==
a. Historical alternative spellings include Hendrebrunnek, Hendrabunyck, Hendraburnycke, Hendraburneck, Hendraburnocke, Henderburnic, Hendrabornicke, and Henderburnick
