= List of museums in Cornwall =

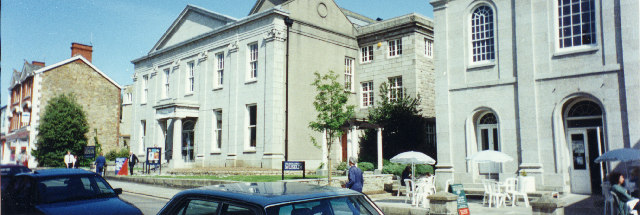
The Royal Cornwall Museum

This list of museums in Cornwall, England, in the United Kingdom, contains museums which are defined for this context as institutions (including nonprofit organizations, government entities, and private businesses) that collect and care for objects of cultural, artistic, scientific, or historical interest and make their collections or related exhibits available for public viewing. Also included are non-profit art galleries and university art galleries. Museums that exist only in cyberspace (i.e. virtual museums) are not included.

== Museums ==
Name	Image	Town/City	Region	Type	Summary
Antony House		Antony	Cornwall	Historic house	Operated by the National Trust, early 18th century estate with gardens, features fine collections of paintings, furniture and textiles
Barbara Hepworth Museum		St Ives	Cornwall	Art	Studio and works by 20th-century sculptor Barbara Hepworth
Bodmin Jail		Bodmin	Cornwall	Prison	Former jail and exhibits of local criminals
Bodmin Town Museum		Bodmin	Cornwall	Local	history, culture, industry, natural history, transport
Callington Heritage Centre		Callington	Cornwall	Local	history, culture, mining, agriculture
Camborne School of Mines Museum		Tremough	Cornwall	Mining	Mining and geology
The Castle, Bude		Bude	Cornwall	Multiple	history, culture, Bude Canal, maritime, railway, art exhibits; formerly the home of Victorian inventor Sir Goldsworthy Gurney. The Castle is accredited by Arts Council England. Free entry.
Charlestown Shipwreck & Heritage Centre		Charlestown	Cornwall	Maritime	history of diving, salvage and shipwrecks, also mining and minerals
Constantine Museum		Constantine	Cornwall	Local	history, culture, mining, agriculture
Cornish Mines and Engines		Pool	Cornwall	Mining	Collection of engine houses, beam engines and an industrial heritage discovery centre
Cornwall's Regimental Museum		Bodmin	Cornwall	Military	Duke of Cornwall's Light Infantry regimental artifacts and history
Cotehele		Calstock	Cornwall	Historic house	Operated by the National Trust, Tudor house featuring tapestries, textiles, arms and armour, pewter, brass and old oak furniture, gardens
Davidstow Airfield Cornwall at War Museum		Davidstow	Cornwall	Military	History of former WW II airfield, military life in region
Davidstow Moor RAF Memorial War Museum		Davidstow	Cornwall	Military	Housed in the former sergeants' shower block, pictorial history of the airfield's wartime years with local memorabilia
Elliott's Shop		Saltash	Cornwall	History	historic grocery store, operated by the Tamar Protection Society
The Exchange		Penzance	Cornwall	Art	Satellite location of Newlyn Art Gallery, contemporary art
Falmouth Art Gallery		Falmouth	Cornwall	Art	Features work by Old Masters, major Victorian artists, British Impressionists, maritime artists, children's book illustrators, automata, contemporary painters and printmakers
Fowey Museum		Fowey	Cornwall	Local	information, history, culture, shipping
Geevor Tin Mine		Pendeen	Cornwall	Mining	Former tin mine
Gerrans Parish Heritage Centre		Gerrans	Cornwall	Local	history, culture
Godolphin Estate		Godolphin Cross	Cornwall	Historic house	Operated by the National Trust, Tudor/Stuart mansion, complete with early formal gardens
Gwithi An Pystri - A Cabinet of Folklore and Magic		Falmouth	Cornwall	Local	Folklore and magic
Grampound with Creed Heritage Centre		Grampound	Cornwall	Local	history
Hayle Heritage Centre		Hayle	Cornwall	Local	operated by the Harvey’s Foundry Trust
Museum of Cornish Life		Helston	Cornwall	Local	History, culture, art, archaeology, mining, fishing, farming, costumes
Isles of Scilly Museum		Hugh Town, St Mary's	Cornwall	Local	as of 2023 "Museum on the Move" as former building has been condemned; new Cultural Centre and Museum under development
Jamaica Inn		Bolventor	Cornwall	Multiple	Features a museum with exhibits on smuggling in the area and the inn's role, and author Daphne du Maurier
John Betjeman Centre		Wadebridge	Cornwall	Biographical	works and memorabilia of poet and author John Betjeman, located in the Wadebridge railway station
King Edward Mine Museum		Camborne	Cornwall	Mining	Former tin mine
Lanhydrock		Helston	Cornwall	Historic house	Operated by the National Trust, high Victorian style country estate with gardens
Launceston Steam Railway		Launceston	Cornwall	Railway	Heritage railway with museum of vintage transport and machinery in station
Lawrence House Museum		Launceston	Cornwall	Local	1753 Georgian house with displays about local history
Leach Pottery		St Ives	Cornwall	Art	20th century studio art pottery
Levant Mine and Beam Engine		Trewellard	Cornwall	Mining	Visitor center for former copper and tin mine, working steam-powered beam engine
Liskeard and District Museum		Liskeard	Cornwall	Local	local history, mining interpretation, tin toys, plastics and the environment
Lizard Lighthouse Heritage Centre		Lizard Point	Cornwall	Maritime	History and role of the lighthouse
Looe Museum		Looe	Cornwall	Local	information, 15th-century guildhall and prison, exhibits on history, culture, fishing, mining
Lostwithiel Museum		Lostwithiel	Cornwall	Local	information, history, culture, mining
Luxulyan Museum and Heritage Centre		Luxulyan	Cornwall	Local	information, history, culture
Marazion Museum		Marazion	Cornwall	Local	history, culture, mining, agriculture
Mary Newman's Cottage		Saltash	Cornwall	Historic house	17th century period Elizabethan cottage, reputedly the home of explorer Sir Francis Drake's first wife, operated by the Tamar Protection Society
Mevagissey Museum		Mevagissey	Cornwall	Local	history, culture, fishing, shipping, smuggling
Moseley Industrial Narrow Gauge Tramway and Toy Museum		Tolgus Mount	Cornwall	Toy, Railroad	open by appointment, vintage toys, model trail layouts, railroad memorabilia, narrow gauge train rides
Mount Edgcumbe House		Cremyll	Cornwall	Historic house	16th century great house restored to 18th century period, with art, tapestries, porcelain, gardens,
Museum of Witchcraft		Boscastle	Cornwall	History	Witchcraft and Wiccan artifacts
National Maritime Museum Cornwall		Falmouth	Cornwall	Maritime	Home of the National Small Boat Collection, exhibitions on Cornwall's maritime history, boat conservation and experimental boat building. Also houses the Bartlett Library of books and archives, particularly relating to Falmouth's maritime history.
Newlyn Art Gallery		Newlyn	Cornwall	Art	Contemporary art
Newquay Heritage Archive & Museum		Newquay	Cornwall	Local	operated by the Newquay Old Cornwall Society
North Cornwall Museum and Art Gallery (closed)		Camelford	Cornwall	Multiple	Local history, art, agriculture and household items, Cornish and Devonshire pottery, industrial and tradesmen's tools
Padstow Museum		Padstow	Cornwall	Local	history, culture, maritime
Pencarrow		Bodmin	Cornwall	Historic house	18th-century mansion and gardens
Pendennis Castle		Falmouth	Cornwall	Military	Fortress built by Henry VIII, displays through WW II
Penlee House		Penzance	Cornwall	Art	Paintings by members of the Newlyn School
Penryn Museum		Penryn	Cornwall	Local	information, history, culture
Perranzabuloe Museum		Perranporth	Cornwall	Local	history, culture, mining, fishing, farming
PK Porthcurno, Museum of Global Communications		Porthcurno	Cornwall	Technology	History, technology, WW II
Poldark Mine		Wendron	Cornwall	Mining	Former tin mine
Polperro Heritage Museum of Smuggling and Fishing		Polperro	Cornwall	Maritime	
Port Eliot		St Germans	Cornwall	Historic house	Country mansion estate, gardens, museum of folklore
Porthcurno Telegraph Museum		Porthcurno	Cornwall	Technology	History of telegraph cables
Prideaux Place		Padstow	Cornwall	Historic house	Country mansion with royal and family portraits, fine furniture, the Prideaux Porcelain Collection, gardens
Redruth Old Cornwall Society Museum		Redruth	Cornwall	Local	information, history, culture, mining, household items
Cornwall Museum and Art Gallery		Truro	Cornwall	Multiple	Art, archaeology, local history, natural history, geology, decorative arts, coins, Egyptian and world culture artifacts
Saltash Museum		Saltash	Cornwall	Local	operated by Saltash Heritage, local history, culture, records, photographic and document archive, archeology unit
Shire Horse Farm and Carriage Museum		Redruth	Cornwall	Transportation	working horse farm and collection of horse-drawn carriages
Sir Richard Francis Burton Museum		St Ives	Cornwall	Local	Life story of Sir Richard Francis Burton
St Agnes Museum		St Agnes	Cornwall	Local	history, culture, mining, minerals, maritime
St Hilary Heritage Centre		St Hilary	Cornwall	Local	Located in the parish church,
St Ives Museum		St Ives	Cornwall	Local	information, history, culture, mining, fishing, agriculture
St Michael's Mount		St Michael's Mount	Cornwall	Historic house	Operated by the National Trust, tours of the island castle
Stuart House		Liskeard	Cornwall	Local	late medieval town house, exhibits about the English Civil War
Tate St Ives		St Ives	Cornwall	Art	Work by modern British artists, including work of the St Ives School
Tintagel Old Post Office		Tintagel	Cornwall	Philatelic	Operated by the National Trust, 19th century period post office in a 14th-century yeoman's farmhouse
Tolgus Tin Mill		Tolgus Mount	Cornwall	Mining	working tin mill, also hosts the Redruth Old Cornwall Society Town Museum
Trerice		Newquay	Cornwall	Historic house	Operated by the National Trust, Elizabethan manor house, orchard, lawn mower collection
Valhalla Museum		Tresco	Cornwall	Maritime	Outdoor exhibits including figureheads, name-boards and other decorative carvings from the days of sail
Wheal Martyn China Clay Country Park		Treverbyn	Cornwall	Industry	china clay mining industry, local clay communities and the modern china clay industry

== Defunct museums ==
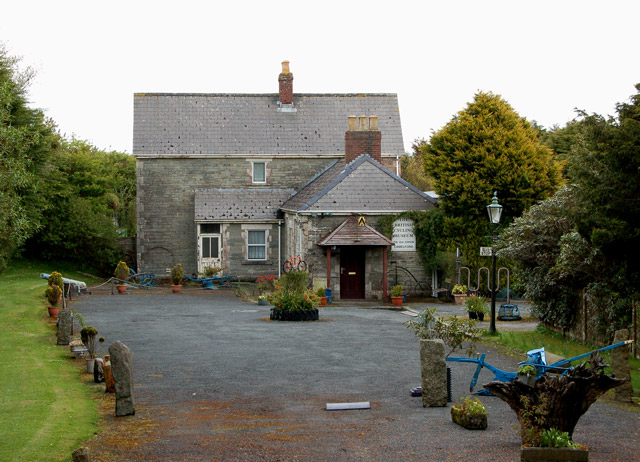
The former British Cycling Museum at Camelford Station

- Barnes Museum of Cinematography, St Ives
- British Cycling Museum, Camelford Station, Camelford
- Cornwall Geological Museum, Penzance
- Flambards Experience, Helston, Cornwall
- Heartlands, Pool, Cornwall. Regeneration of former mining land
- Trevarno. Closed in 2012. Included National Museum of Gardening, gardens, woodland walks, a sub-tropical conservatory
- Trinity House National Lighthouse Museum, Penzance
- Wayside Folk Museum, Zennor, Cornwall

== See also ==
- List of farms in Cornwall
- List of places in Cornwall
- List of windmills in Cornwall
- Visitor attractions in Cornwall
