= Trenoon =

Farm in Cornwall, England

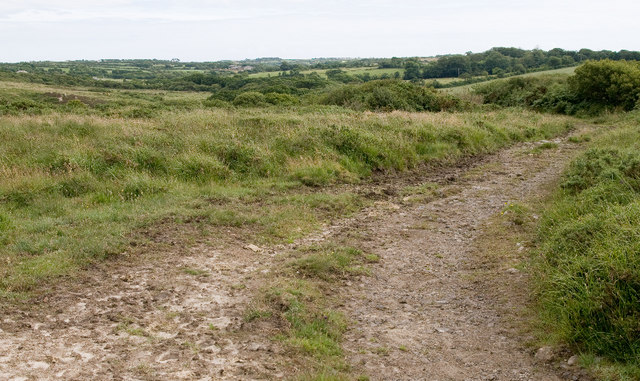
Bridleway near Trenoon

Trenoon is a farm and former medieval settlement in the parish of Grade-Ruan, Cornwall, England, UK. It is on the edge of Goonhilly Downs.

Prior to the merger of the parishes of Grade, Ruan Major and Ruan Minor, Trenoon lay in Ruan Major. Despite this the entire tithe belonged to the St Grada and Holy Cross Church, Grade.

== See also ==
- List of farms in Cornwall
