= Bodrean =

Hamlet in Cornwall, England

Coordinates: 50.292°N 5.022°W

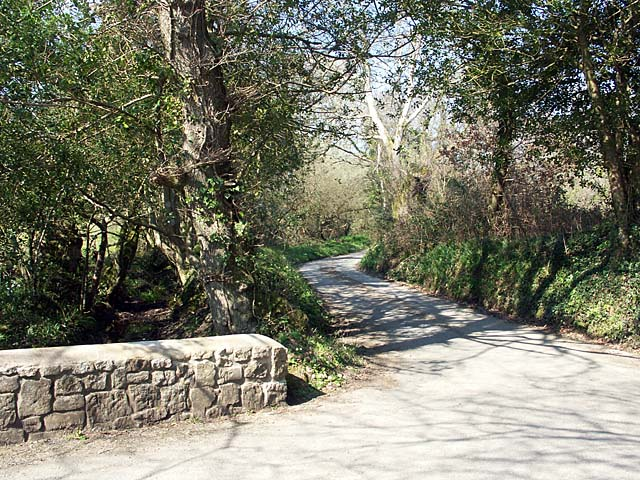
The bridge across the Trevella Stream at Frogmore

Bodrean (Cornish: Bosrian) and Frogmore are farmstead settlements in Cornwall, England, United Kingdom, situated two miles (3.5 kilometres) north-northeast of Truro.

Bodrean Manor Farm is located at grid reference SW 850 480 on high ground overlooking the Trevella Stream. The farm specialises in Aberdeen Angus cattle and also provides holiday accommodation. The name means 'dwelling of Rian'.

Frogmore is located at grid reference SW 856 483 where a lane crosses the Trevella Stream, a tributary of the Truro River, on a stone bridge.

== See also ==
- List of farms in Cornwall
