= Trevowhan =

Hamlet in Cornwall, England

Coordinates: 50.162503°N 5.628551°W

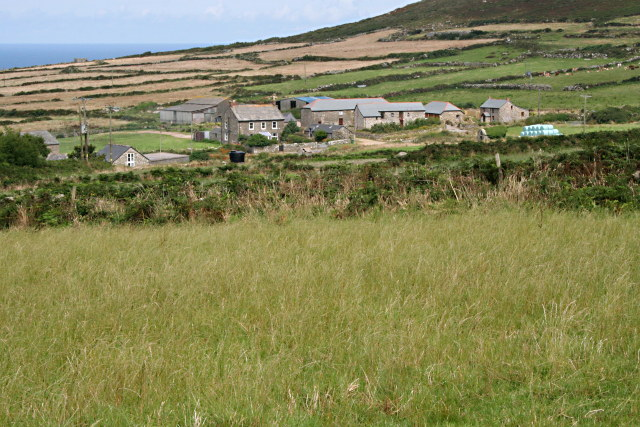
Trevowhan

Trevowhan is a hamlet in the parish of Morvah, Cornwall, England, UK, and lies 0.5 miles east of the village of Morvah.

A terrace of a house and two cottages in the hamlet is a Grade II listed building.

In 1427 dwelling houses and surrounding land there was recorded as being held by a John Trevaygnon, but it was not known which Lord he was in the service of. In 1882 there were two farms there consisting of 82.5 acres.

On 10 July 1745 John Wesley visited the hamlet and preached a sermon, during which a constable read the Riot Act.

Trevowhan has a bus service which is used by visitors to nearby Chun Quoit.

== See also ==
- List of farms in Cornwall
