= Carn Arthen =

Farmstead in Cornwall, England

Coordinates: 50.212°N 5.267°W

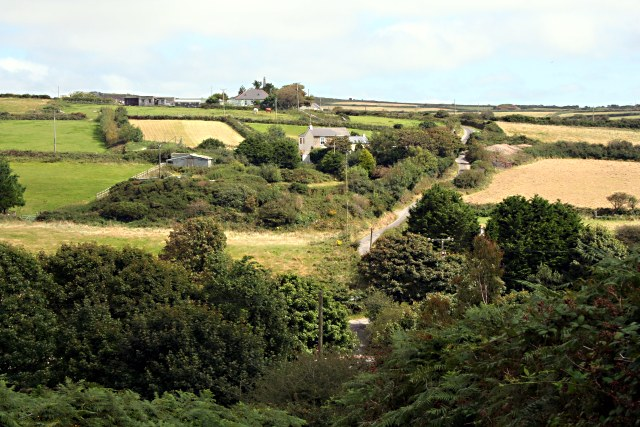
Looking over the Brea Valley to Carn Arthen

Carn Arthen (Cornish: Karn Arthur, meaning Arthur's rock-pile) is farmstead 1.7 miles (2.7 km) south-east of Camborne near to Tuckingmill in Cornwall, England.

== See also ==
- List of farms in Cornwall
