= Tregolls =

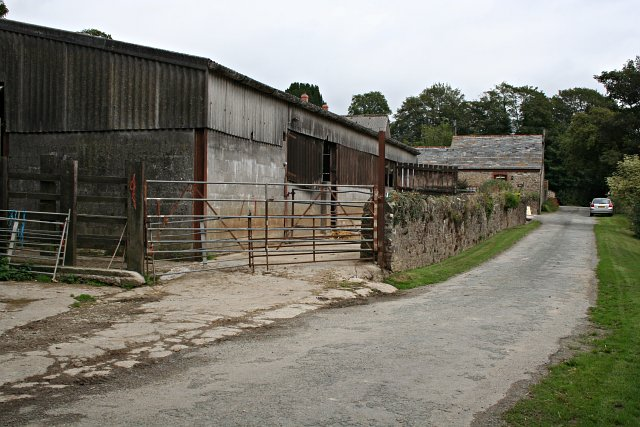
Tregolls

Tregolls is a farm in the parish of St Wenn and one mile northeast of the village of St Wenn in mid Cornwall, England, UK.

== See also ==
- List of farms in Cornwall
