= Pentire, Cornwall =

Coordinates: 50.411°N 5.114°W

Pentire: Cornish: Pentir
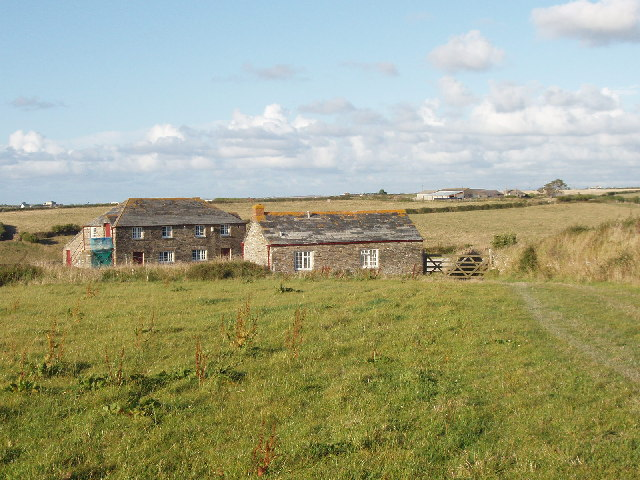
- Pentire Farm

- Location within Cornwall
- Unitary authority: Cornwall
- Ceremonial county: Cornwall
- Region: South West
- Country: England
- Sovereign state: United Kingdom
- Police: Devon and Cornwall
- Fire: Cornwall
- Ambulance: South Western

Pentire (Cornish: Pentir, meaning promontory) is a farm near St Eval in Cornwall, England. On the coast nearby is Pentire Steps.

It should not be confused with Pentire, a western suburb of Newquay (grid ref. SW7961).

== See also ==
- List of farms in Cornwall
