= New Downs =

Farm in Cornwall, England

Coordinates: 50.467°N 4.780°W

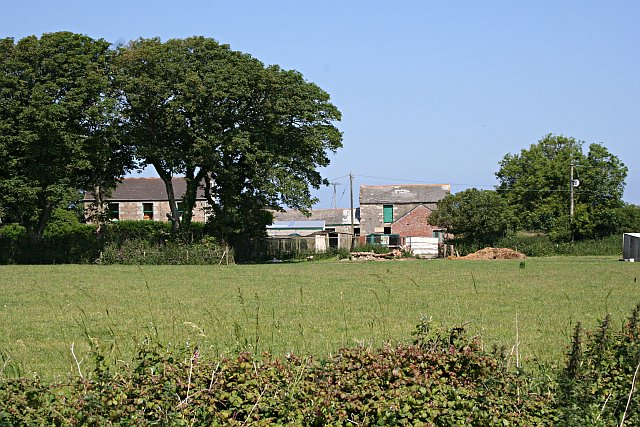
New Downs Farm

New Downs is a farm near Camborne and St Agnes in Cornwall, England.

== History ==
The location has been known as New Down or New Downs since at least 1768. In 1864, a ploughman on the New Downs, which was a parcel of the inner Goonbrey tenement, turned up a Roman coin picturing the Emperor Valentinian. Other archaeological finds have been made at this site.

== See also ==
- List of farms in Cornwall
