= Dannonchapel =

Coordinates: 50.607°N 4.773°W

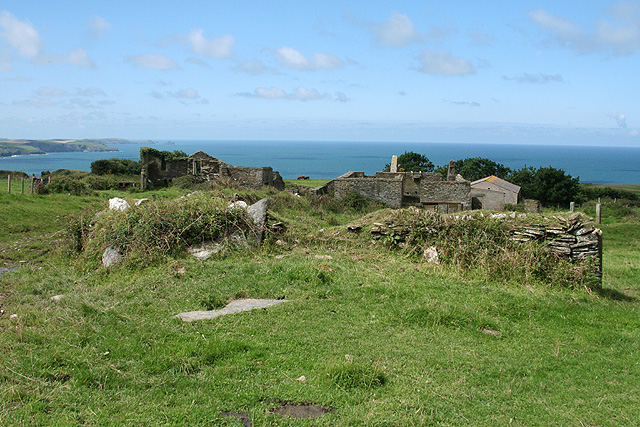
Dannonchapel

Dannonchapel is a ruined farm in Cornwall, England. It is about two miles southwest of Delabole. Dannonchapel was a farm in Domesday Book (1086) occupied by one villein and 4 serfs, and held by Blohin from Robert, Count of Mortain. Its value was reduced to 15 shillings (in the reign of King Edward it was 25 shillings i.e. £1-25).

== See also ==
- List of farms in Cornwall
