= Hay, Cornwall =

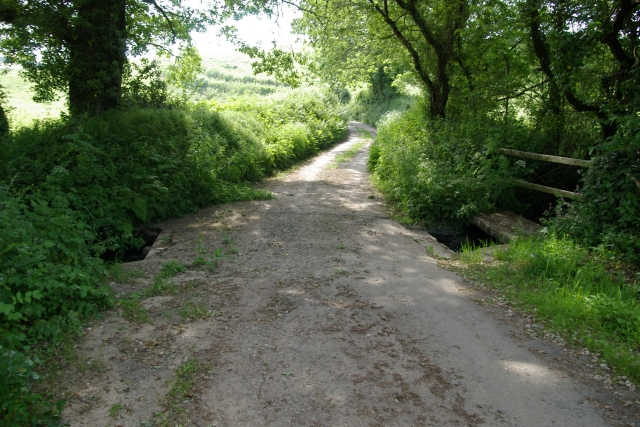
A dry ford, Hay Farm

Hay is a farm near Quethiock in Cornwall, England.

== See also ==
- List of farms in Cornwall
