= Lantuel =

Konok

Coordinates: 50.471°N 4.852°W

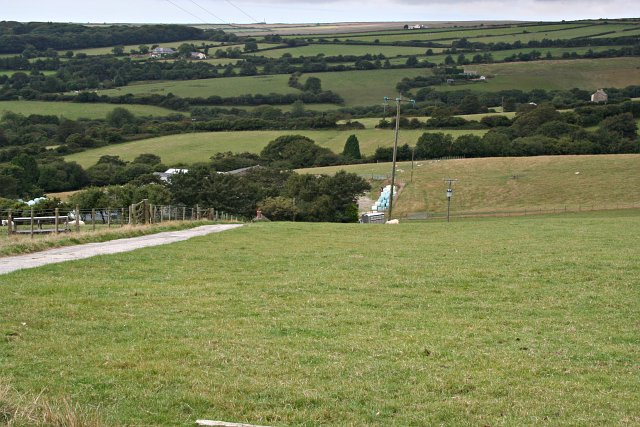
Land around Lantuel Farm

Lantuel is a farmstead in the parish of Withiel, Cornwall, England.

== See also ==
- List of farms in Cornwall
