= Lavrean =

Coordinates: 50.393°N 4.773°W

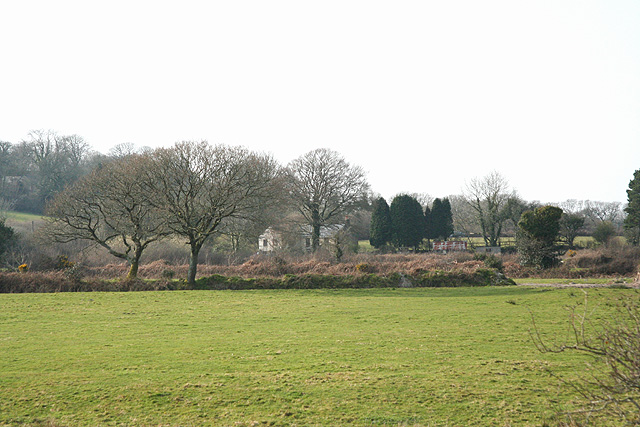
- Landscape near Lavrean, seen from an excursion train between Luxulyan and Goonbarrow Junction on the Newquay branch

- Location within Cornwall
- OS grid reference: SX030585
- Civil parish: Luxulyan
- Unitary authority: Cornwall
- Ceremonial county: Cornwall
- Region: South West
- Country: England
- Sovereign state: United Kingdom
- Post town: St Austell
- Postcode district: PL26

Lavrean is a hamlet in the parish of Luxulyan, Cornwall, England. It is in the civil parish of Treverbyn
