= Lane-end =

Hamlet in Cornwall, England

Coordinates: 50°29′20″N 4°45′56″W

Lane-end is a hamlet in the parish of Egloshayle, Cornwall, England. It is in the civil parish of St Mabyn
