= Lambourne, Cornwall =

Hamlet in Cornwall, England

Coordinates: 50.323°N 5.138°W

Lambourne is a farm and hamlet in Cornwall, England. It lies west of the A3075 about a quarter of a mile (400m) south-west of Perranzabuloe.
