= Tresawson =

Coordinates: 50.379°N 4.550°W

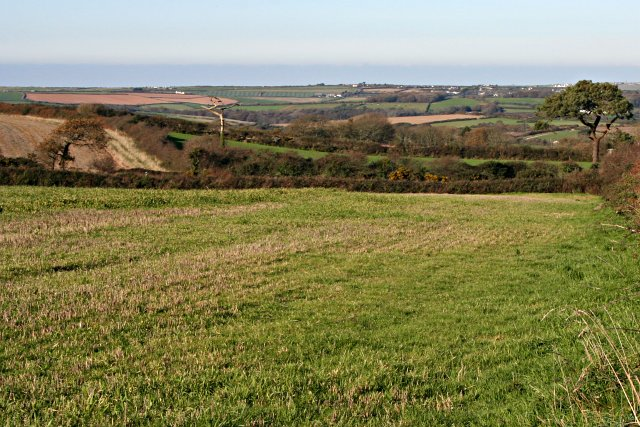
Farmland near Tresawsen

Tresawson is a farm in the parish of Lanreath, Cornwall, England, UK. There are two other places with similar names: Tresawsan in the parish of Merther and Tresawsen in the parish of Perranzabuloe. The meaning of all three is "Englishmen's farm".
