= Lanescot =

Village in Cornwall, England

Coordinates: 50.367°N 4.700°W

Lanescot (Cornish: Lysnestek) is a village in Cornwall, England, United Kingdom. It is in a former mining area, about four miles (6 km) east-northeast of St Austell and four miles (6 km) west-northwest of Fowey. The Saints' Way long-distance footpath passes through Lanescot.

== History ==
Lanescot is recorded in the Domesday Book (1086) as Lisnestoch. The manor was held by Richard from Robert, Count of Mortain. There was land for 5 ploughs. There were 2 ploughs, 2 serfs, 4 smallholders, 1 acre of woodland, 20 acres of pasture, 4 cattle, 2 pigs, 40 sheep and 12 goats. The value of the manor was 10 shillings though it had formerly been worth 15 shillings.

A company to work the Fowey Consols Mine was formed in 1813. It was purchased in 1822 by J. T. Treffry and others; they also purchased the Lanescot Mine in 1836. By the 1840s 1,800 workers were employed and the mine had seven large engines and 13 waterwheels supplied with water from Molinnis Moors more than 4 miles to the northwest by a leat and Treffry's aqueduct at Luxulyan. By 1867 the working of the mine had finished; at its peak it had 17 waterwheels. As of 1972 suggestions had been made that the engine house built for the 80 in pumping engine should be preserved. The Fowey Consols Mine was the 3rd greatest copper mine in Cornwall; together with the Lanescot mine it produced 382,910 tonnes of ore from 1822 to 1867.
