= List of windmills in Cornwall =

A list of windmills in Cornwall, including those in the Isles of Scilly.

== Cornwall ==
Location	Name of mill and grid reference	Type	Maps	First mention or built	Last mention or demise	Photograph
Budock	Arwenack Manor	Sunk post				
Budock	Arwenack Manor	Post		1580	1580	
Budock	Pendennis Castle		1693	1660s	Ruin by 1715	
Callington	Kit Hill Mill			1848	1848	
Fowey		Post		1296	1314, later replaced by tower mill	
Fowey	Treffry's Mill; Treffy Mill; SX 119 519	Tower	1675; 1690; 1748	1564	Converted to folly 19th century Windmill World	
Fowey	Coombe Mill	Post		1314	1314, later replaced by a tower mill	
Fowey	Coombe Mill	Tower	1690	1690	1690	
Gerrans	Tregassa Mill		1748	1588	1748	
Gerrans	Rostreage Mill				Demolished c. 1824	
Gwinear	Relistian Mill			1686	Mentioned in a letter from George Bere junior to Sir John Arundell, dated 29 Nov 1686, Relistian windmill is burnt to the ground, supposed to take fire of itself in working with a very strong wind.	
Landewednack	Landewednack Mill; Mount Herman Mill; SW 693 152	Tower		1695	Windmill World	
Lanteglos by Fowey				1322	In ruins by 1349	
Lanteglos by Fowey				1576	Demolished by 1594	
Lanteglos by Fowey				1594	1702	
Launcells	Raggett Mill			1684	1809	
Launceston				1391	1393, possibly survived as late as 1512	
Looe					Derelict by 1823	
Madron	Ding Dong Mine			1797		
Maker	Empacombe Mill; SX 445 529	Tower		1729	Windmill World	
Manaccan					Demolished c. 1816	
Marazion				1342	1342	
Marazion	Mounts Bay			c. 1820	c. 1820	
Morwenstow	Tonacombe		1748	1727	1748	
Padstow	Trevone Mill; SX 897 749	Tower		17th century	Converted to water tower 20th century Windmill World	
Padstow				1455	1458	
Padstow			1675; 1748	1537	1748	
Par	Trenython, Par Station	Two Titt iron wind engines		1894		
Philleigh	Treworthal Mill		1675; 1748	1654	1753	
St Agnes				1824	1824	
St Austell				1752	1752	
St Columb Minor	Trenance			1696	1696	
St Gennys			1748	1649	1748	
St Ives	Eathorne's Mill			1732	1883	
St Just in Penwith	Wheal Whidden	Vertical axle mill		1849	1849	
St Just in Penwith	Bollowall Farm	Wind wheel			1910, gone by 1920	
St Just in Roseland	Trevennal Mill	Post		1560	1695	
St Just in Roseland	Trevennal Mill	Tower	1810	1695		
St Mawgan in Meneage	Cruge Weith			1585	1585	
St Merryn	Trehemborne Farm	Tower		Mid-17th century		
St Minver	Shalders' Mill	Tower		1833	1840	
St Minver	Carlyon Hill Mill; SW 958 754	Tower	1748; 1813; 1827	c. 1690	Windmill World	
Week St Mary	Creddacott			1305	1305	
Wendron				1690s	1690s	

== Isles of Scilly ==
Location	Name of mill and grid reference	Type	Maps	First mention or built	Last mention or demise	Photograph
Scilly	Mill belonging to Ranulf Blanchminster, lord of the manor of Scilly				In ruins by 1348	
St Mary's	Star Castle (two mills)	Tower		1593	In ruins by 1732	
St Mary's	Penninis Head	Tower		1726	1783, out of use by 1796, later converted to observation tower - "Rowel's Tower"	
St Mary's	Spanish Mill	Tower		1820	Working late 19th century	

== Maps ==
- 1675 John Ogilby
- 1690 Collins
- 1693 Collins
- 1748 Martyn
- 1810 Ordnance Survey
- 1827 C & J Greenwood

== See also ==
- List of farms in Cornwall

== Notes ==
Mills in bold are still standing, known building dates are indicated in bold. Text in italics denotes indicates that the information is not confirmed, but is likely to be the case stated.

== Sources ==
Unless otherwise stated, the source for all entries is Douch, H L. Cornish Windmills. Truro: Oscar Blackford Ltd.
