= Arrallas =

Coordinates: 50.3476°N 4.9786°W

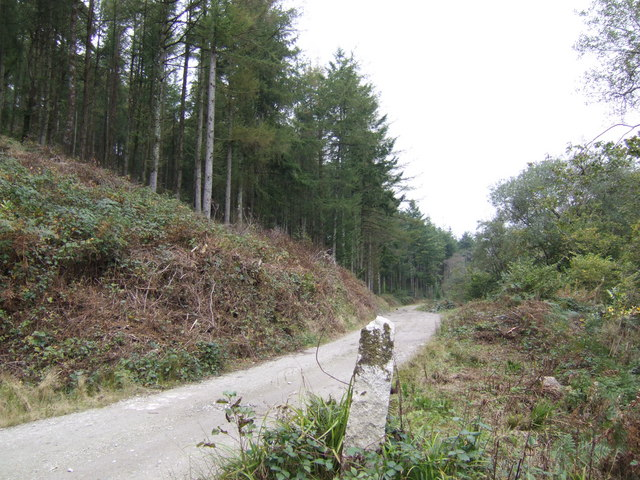
The menhir by the track to Arrallas

Arrallas (also Argallez and Argalles) was a manorial settlement recorded in the Domesday Book, which, in 1086, it had seven households and three ploughlands. It is located in the parish of St Enoder in Cornwall, England. Its name derives from the Cornish language words arghans and lys meaning "silver court", with the lys likely denoting a site of royal importance.

In the fourth year of the reign of Edward I (c. 1276) a jury in the Hundred of Powdershire held that Robert de Cardinan had held the fee in chief of Henry III, but this was alienated by Isolda de Cardinan and was then now held by a Mauger de St. Albin. When a Guy St Aubyn's widow Alice Sergeaux married Richard de Vere, 11th Earl of Oxford it passed to the earl, before returning to the St Aubyn family. In the fifteenth century becoming vested in the crown it was granted to George Plantagenet, Duke of Clarence c. 1462. In 1492 the manor was granted to John de Vere, 13th Earl of Oxford, who forfeited it and whence it came to the Duke of Gloucester. It later passed to the Vyvyan baronets and Rashleigh family.

Arrallas Farm is now part of the 2,215 acre Arrallas Estate acquired by the Duchy of Cornwall in 1952. The 18th century farmhouse is a Grade II listed building, as is a range of associated farm buildings.
