= Nathan Buzza =

Australian businessman (born 1970)

- Born: 26 November 1970 (age 55); Perth, Australia
- Education: Scotch College; Curtin University
- Occupations: entrepreneur, investor

Nathan Buzza (born 26 November 1970) is an Australian entrepreneur, investor and the founder of CommtechWireless. He received Ernst & Young "Entrepreneur of the Year" in 2005 and the Western Australia IT&T "Lifetime achievement award" for contributions to the Australian IT Community in 2006. Aged 14, he had developed computer games Qubert and Q-Zar.

== Early life and career ==
Buzza was born in Perth, Australia. After completing schooling from Scotch College, he joined Curtin University for Bachelor of Business degree program. Since childhood, he had a keen interest in entrepreneurship and to fulfill his dreams, he dropped out of University in between before completing his business degree. In 1992, Buzza along with his childhood friend Zane Lewis co-founded CommtechWireless to supply middleware clinical workflow software solutions to the healthcare companies. The company received R&D start grant from the government to develop software solutions for mid-clinical healthcare companies. The company saw an early success and expanded its locations in Denmark, Hong Kong, Sydney and Jacksonville with headquarter in Perth. By 2005, the company installed their middleware health solutions in 60 countries and was named as one of the fastest growing businesses by BRW Magazine and Deloitte Touche Tohmatsu.

In 2008, Amcom Software acquired CommtechWireless, for an undisclosed sum and Buzza remained with the company for 18 months as a general manager. Business News awarded Buzza with "First Amongst Equals" 40 under 40 Award.

In 2011, Buzza established a Private Equity firm, Allure Capital offering seed capital to firms in the healthcare and technology industry. In 2012, he joined Austco, a subsidiary of Azure Healthcare Limited (ASX:AZV) as a management consultant and remained with company until April 2014. Currently, he serves an advisory board member of the NiQ Healthcare, General Partner in Future Health and Company Director at Alcidion Corporation.

== Accolades ==
- 2002 Ernst & Young, Entrepreneur of the Year (Young)
- 2003 Business News, 1st Amongst Equals (40 Under 40 Awards)
