= Lamberhurst Quarter =

Hamlet in Kent, England

Coordinates: 51°7′19.6″N 0°21′56.76″E

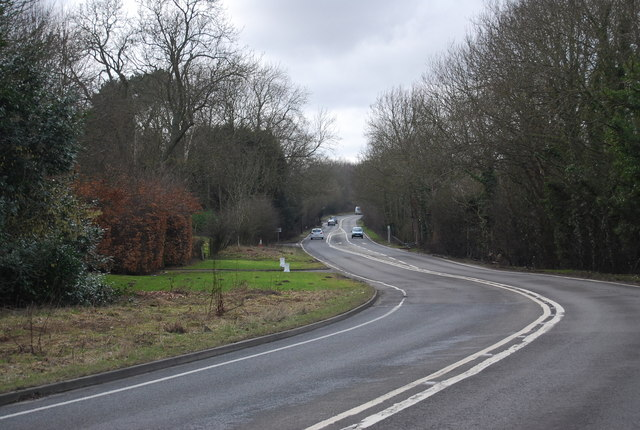
- The A21 passing through Lamberhurst Quarter

- Location within Kent
- Civil parish: Lamberhurst
- District: Tunbridge Wells
- Shire county: Kent
- Region: South East
- Country: England
- Sovereign state: United Kingdom
- Post town: Tunbridge Wells
- Postcode district: TN3
- Police: Kent
- Fire: Kent
- Ambulance: South East Coast
- UK Parliament: Tunbridge Wells

Lamberhurst Quarter is a hamlet on the A21 road, in the civil parish of Lamberhurst, in the Tunbridge Wells district, in the county of Kent, England. It is near the village of Lamberhurst.
