= Lanehead =

Hamlet in County Durham, England

Coordinates: 54.77°N 2.24°W

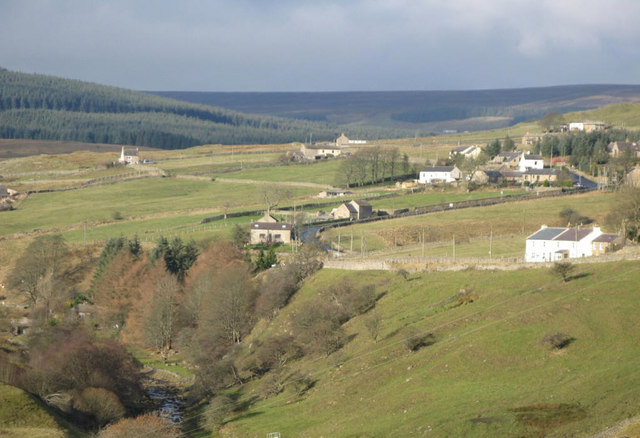
- Cornriggs and Lanehead

- Location within County Durham
- Population: 40 (2001 census)
- Civil parish: Stanhope
- Unitary authority: County Durham
- Ceremonial county: County Durham
- Region: North East
- Country: England
- Sovereign state: United Kingdom

Lanehead is a hamlet in the civil parish of Stanhope, in County Durham, England. It lies at the head of Weardale, approximately 2 km west of Cowshill. It is also located near to Killhope, and the boundary of the county of Cumbria. In the 2001 census Lanehead had a population of 40.

The primary industry in the area is farming, and the River Wear runs through the area. It is the first village encountered when entering County Durham from the West, from Alston.
