= Lanjew =

Coordinates: 50.449°N 4.840°W

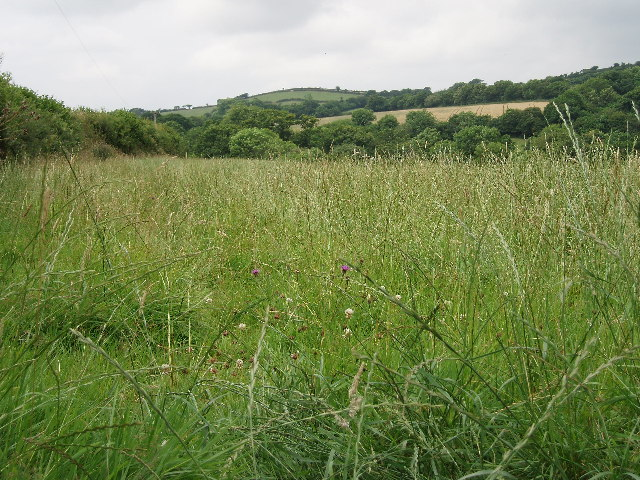
A hay meadow by Lanjew Farm

Lanjew (Cornish: Lendu, meaning dark strip of land) is a farm in the parish of Withiel in Cornwall, England.

== See also ==
- List of farms in Cornwall
