= Trewinnion =

Hamlet in Cornwall, England

Coordinates: 50.3768°N 4.9816°W

- Location within Cornwall
- OS grid reference: SW881573
- Civil parish: St Enoder
- Unitary authority: Cornwall
- Ceremonial county: Cornwall
- Region: South West
- Country: England
- Sovereign state: United Kingdom
- Post town: NEWQUAY
- Postcode district: TR8
- Dialling code: 01872
- Police: Devon and Cornwall
- Fire: Cornwall
- Ambulance: South Western
- UK Parliament: North Cornwall

Trewinnion is a hamlet in mid Cornwall, England, United Kingdom. It is situated north of the village of Summercourt about four miles (6.5 km) south-west of Newquay. The settlement consists of a large farmstead and several cottages. Trewinnion was formerly a manor in the ancient parish of St Enoder which was mortgaged in the 1850s by the Mohun family.

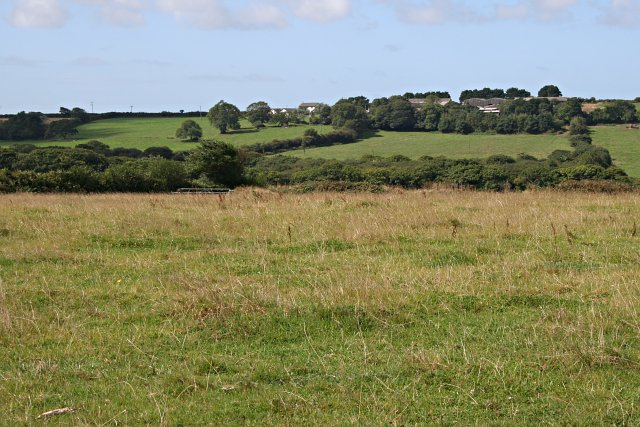
Trewinnion seen across the fields(image courtesy of Geograph )
