= Buzza Tower =

Tower in St. Mary's, Isles of Scilly, England

Spanish Mill Buzza Tower
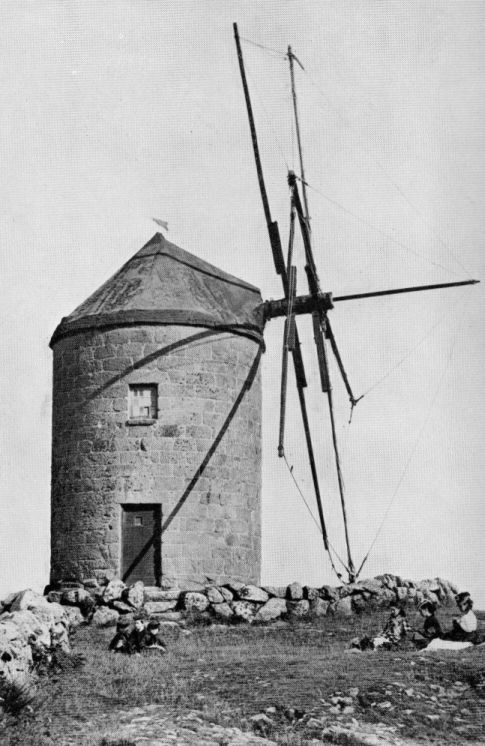
- Interactive map of Spanish Mill; Buzza Tower

Origin
- Mill location: St Mary's, Isles of Scilly
- Grid reference: SV 906 103
- Coordinates: 49°54′48″N 6°18′39″W
- Year built: 1821

Information
- Type: Tower mill
- Storeys: Three storey tower
- No. of sails: Eight
- Type of sails: Jib sails
- Windshaft: Wood
- Winding: Internal winch
- Other information: Also known as the King Edward Memorial Tower; Grade II listed building #1291886

Buzza Tower is a Grade II listed structure on St Mary's, Isles of Scilly. Formerly a windmill, it was later converted to a camera obscura.

== History ==
The tower was built in 1821 as a windmill. It was the fourth and last windmill to be built in the Isles of Scilly. One of the first millers was Thomas Wetherall, who leased the mill for 5s per annum. George Davis was the miller in 1856. He was followed by William Watt. The mill was called the Spanish Mill when it was a working windmill.

It was restored in 1912 as a memorial to King Edward VII when the exterior was provided with sheltered seating. The mill was listed as Grade II on 14 December 1992.

Between 2012 and 2014 the tower was restored and a camera obscura was installed which opened to the public in 2014. The obscura closed during the COVID-19 pandemic, and has not re-opened.

== Description ==
The mill is a three storey tower mill. The mill had a wooden windshaft which carried eight jib sails, similar to those found on windmills in countries bordering the Mediterranean Sea. The cap would have been winded by an internal winch.
