= Bolitho (surname) =

Bolitho is a surname of Cornish origin, derived from Bolitho in west Cornwall. Notable people with the surname include:

- Bob Bolitho (born 1952), Canadian soccer player
- Edward Bolitho (born 1955), British Army officer
- Edward Hoblyn Warren Bolitho (1882–1969), Cornish landowner and politician
- Harold Bolitho (1939–2010), Australian academic and expert on Japan at Harvard University
- Hector Bolitho (1897–1974), New Zealand author and novelist
- John Bolitho (1930–2005), bard of the Cornish Gorsedd
- Thomas Bedford Bolitho (1835–1915), Liberal Unionist MP for St Ives, 1887 to 1900
- Thomas Robins Bolitho (1840–1925), English banker
- William Bolitho (cricketer) (1862–1919), English cricketer, banker and British Army officer
- William Bolitho Ryall (1891–1930), South African writer and biographer, who published under the name of William Bolitho
- Bolitho family, Cornish family

Bolitho is also a fictional surname:

- Richard Bolitho and Adam Bolitho, Royal Navy officers created by British author Alexander Kent
