= Maddern =

Maddern is a surname. Notable people with the surname include:

- Anne Maddern (born 1955), Australian politician
- Barry Maddern (1937–1994), Australian barrister and jurist
- Clarence Maddern (1921–1986), American baseball player
- Philippa Maddern (1952–2014), Australian historian
- Rebecca Maddern (born 1977), Australian television presenter and journalist
- Victor Maddern (1928–1993), English actor
- Richard John Maddern-Williams, music teacher and organist

== See also ==
- St Maddern's Church, Madron
- Madron (saint)
