= Alexander Daniell =

- Born: 12 December 1599; Middelburg, Walcheren
- Died: 12 April 1668 (aged 68); Larigan, Cornwall
- Resting place: Madron, Cornwall
- Other names: Alexander Daniel
- Children: ten

Alexander Daniell (12 December 1599 – 12 April 1668) was the sole proprietor of the Manor of Alverton, Cornwall from 1630 until his death in 1668.

He was born in Middelburg in Walcheren, the son of Richard Daniel, clothier and citizen of London, and on coming to Cornwall in 1632, lived in rented accommodation until 1639, when a new house was built at Larigan, between Penzance and Newlyn. His notebook gives his income and expenditure (actual years not stated in The Cornishman article). In the first year his income is £43 and expenditure £156; the following year his income was £206 and he spends £246; and in the third year income was £181 and expenditure £219. It appears that excess of expenditure over income was the norm. He was interested in the history of the manor and made copies of rent-rolls preserving information on the parishes of Madron, St Buryan, and St Levan as well as Alverton. One of Daniell's manuscripts, known as the Rawlinson MSS, class C No 789 is preserved in the Bodleian Library, Oxford.

He died at his residence on 12 April 1668 and is buried at Madron. The following is inscribed on his tomb:–

Belgia me Birth, Britain me Breeding gave,
Cornwall a wife, ten children, and a grave.

Daniel's tomb, along with members of his family, is in the churchyard at Madron.
