= William Bolitho =

William Bolitho may refer to:

- William Bolitho Ryall (1891–1930), South African journalist, writer and biographer
- William Bolitho (cricketer) (1862–1919), English cricketer, banker and British Army officer
