= Madron Well and Madron Well Chapel =

Ruined medieval chapel in England

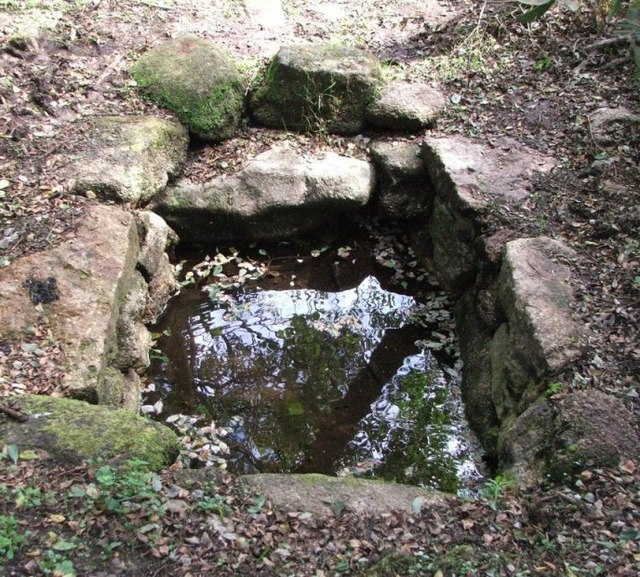
- Madron Well

- Location within Southwest Cornwall
- 50°08′23″N 5°34′33″W
- Type: Chapel and well
- Periods: Medieval
- Location: Cornwall

Site notes
- Owner: Bolitho Estate
- Public access: Yes

Scheduled monument
- Official name: Holy well called Madron Well
- Designated: 19 March 1970
- Reference no.: 1004310

Scheduled monument
- Official name: Medieval chapel known as Madron Well Chapel associated with Madron holy well
- Designated: 30 November 1926
- Reference no.: 1006728

Listed Building – Grade II
- Official name: Baptistry Chapel of St Madern's Well at SW 446327
- Designated: 10 June 1954
- Reference no.: 1143608

Madron Well and Madron Well Chapel (known to Christians in Cornish as Fenten Vadern ha Chapel Fenten Vadern; known to Celtic neopagans as Fenten Vodron ha Chapel Fenten Vodron) is a scheduled Ancient Monument in the civil parish of Madron, Cornwall, UK.

Madron Well Chapel (grid reference SW446328) is the ruin of a 12th- or 14th-century chapel dedicated to St Madern and occupies the site of a much older Celtic structure. Madron Well (grid reference SW445327) is a spring 200 m to the west. Clouties, or offerings, can be seen on the path to the chapel, near the holy well.

== Location ==
The chapel and well are 1 mile (1,600 m) to the north-west of the village of Madron and is within the civil parish of the same name. The Bolitho estate owns the monument.

== History and description ==
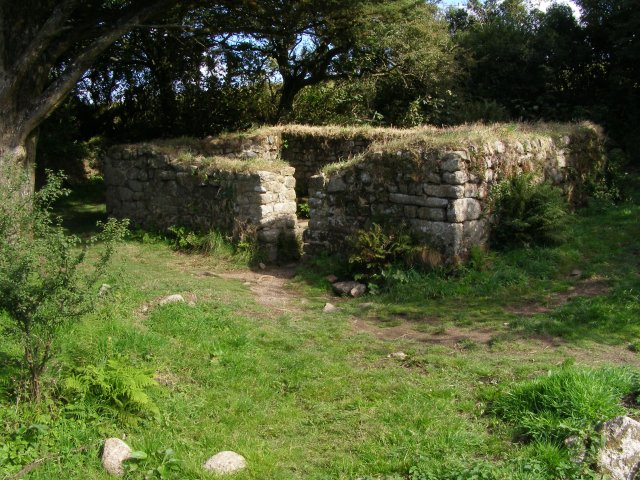
The remains of Madron Well Chapel

The altar stone in the chapel with neopagan offerings to Modron

In 1846 the building's measurements were published in The Archaeological Journal and the roofless building's internal measurements were 20 feet (6.1 m) long by 10 feet (3.0 m) wide, and the walls are 2 feet (61 cm) thick and 8 or 9 feet (2.4 or 2.7 m) high. Measurements published in The Cornishman newspaper of 15 May 1879 gave the external length as 25 feet by 16 feet breadth (7.6 × 4.9 m) and the walls 2 feet (61 cm) thick. The granite altar stone is 5 ft 10 in (178 cm) long, 2 ft 7 in (79 cm) wide and stands 2 ft 10 in (86 cm) above the floor. There is a depression of 9 by 8 inches (23 by 20 centimetres) to contain the portable mensa for the celebration of mass. The altar appears to date from the first half or middle of the 12th century as do the stone seats and chancel. There is no evidence for any part of the structure being older but the existing structure does suggest an early Christian foundation.

The building was partially destroyed by Major Ceely, during the English Civil War. At the 1886 annual meeting of the Penzance Natural History and Antiquarian Society, concern was shown for the removal of stone from here, as well as Kenidjack Castle and Chûn Castle.

A stream flows through the building and until the 18th century the well and stream were the only source of water for Madron and Penzance. The stream's course dictates the unusual placing of the entrance which is on the north wall instead of the normal, west of centre.

The chapel was first scheduled on 30 November 1926; it is currently scheduled under the Ancient Monuments and Archaeological Areas Act 1979 and is considered to be of national importance.

It is a classic site for the nationally scarce Cornish moneywort (Sibthorpia europaea), first reported here in 1824. The Penzance Natural History and Antiquarian Society visited the well and chapel in August 1888 and the members were shown two insectiferous plants; pale butterwort (Pinguicula lusitanica) and round-leaved sundew (Drosera rotundifolia). The members were told plants had been sent to Charles Darwin from this site.

== Well ==
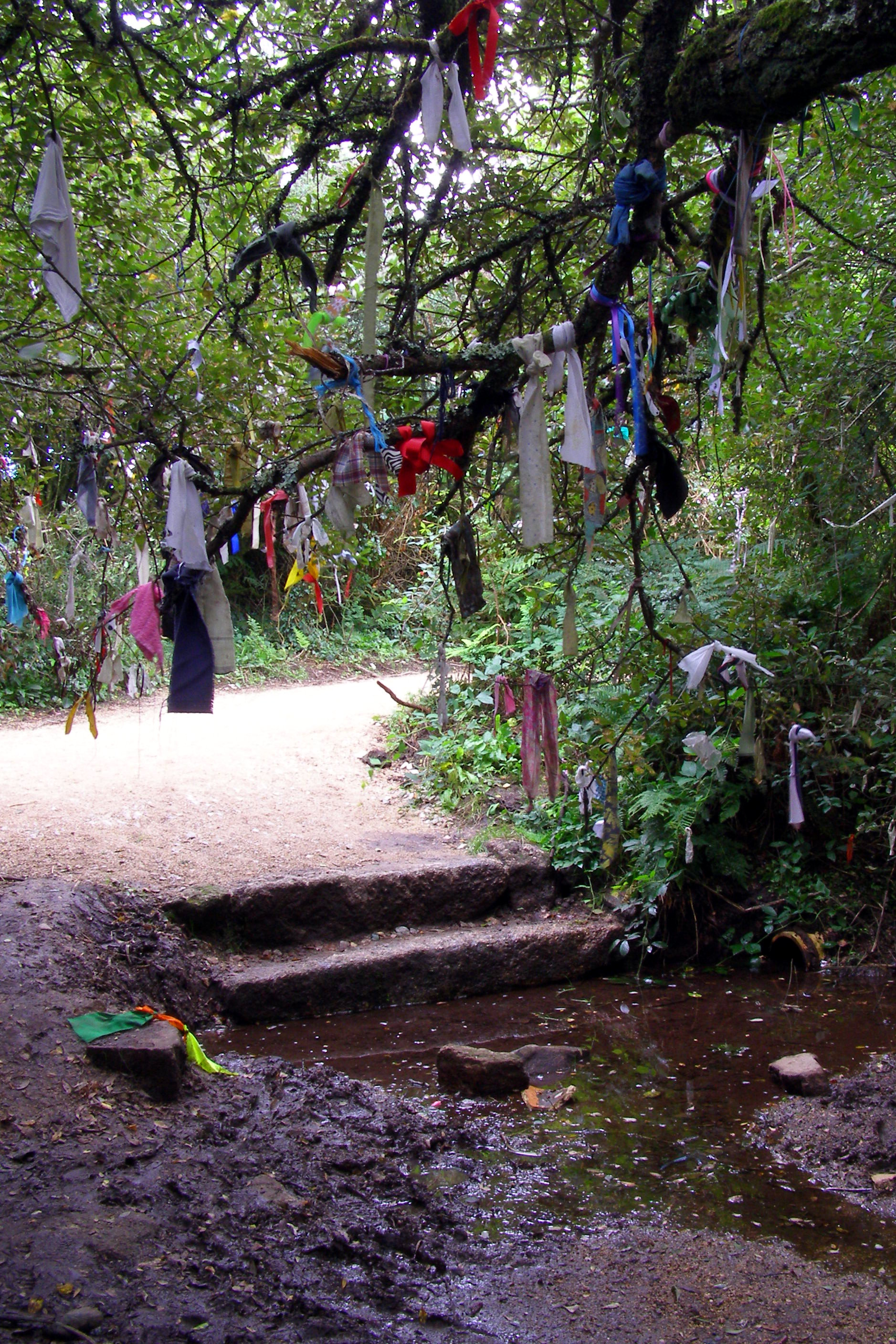
Clouties tied to a tree near Madron Well

The nearby Madron Well, which is now concealed in shrubs and undergrowth, is an example of a Cornish Celtic sacred site and is a ground level natural spring. The well is said to have healing properties and a 17th-century written account tells how, before 1641, John Trelille, a poor cripple, was cured here when he bathed in the water, then slept on a grassy hillock. The hillock was remade every year and was called St Maderne's bed. An old May Day tradition, which was still being observed in 1879, was for many young folks (mainly girls) to head from Penzance before sunrise, to perform a ceremony, to learn the number of years they have to wait before they get married. Two grass stems or straw, each about an inch long were fastened together with a pin and dropped into the water. Any rising bubbles denote the number of years before they get married. The ceremony was no longer held on May Day, but on a Sunday, because the girls work during the week. A tradition at this site persists to this day whereby people attach pieces of rag (clouties) to the nearby bushes as a symbol of appeasement to the spirits within the well (see also Clootie well) – according to a contemporary report in The Cornishman newspaper that tradition was no longer carried out in 1879.

In 1882 there was a proposal to pipe water from the well to Madron Churchtown at a cost of £150, Mr T S Bolitho offered to contribute to the cost.
