= Thomas Bolitho =

Thomas Bolitho may refer to:

- Thomas Bedford Bolitho (1835–1915), Cornish banker, industrialist and politician
- Thomas Robins Bolitho (1840–1925), English banker and landowner
