= Andrew Ketcham Barnett =

British geologist

- Born: 1852; Chacewater, Cornwall, UK
- Died: 1914 (aged 61–62)
- Known for: Inorganic chemistry, mineralogy
- Scientific career
- Fields: mineral collector and Chemist
- Workplaces: Mineralogical Society, Royal Geological Society of Cornwall

Andrew Ketcham Barnett (1852–1914) was a mineral collector and dealer in Penzance, Cornwall, in the United Kingdom. He was Principal of the Penzance School of Mines (now part of the Camborne School of Mines), lectured on mining, and helped to build their mineral collection. He also served as Mayor of Penzance on seven occasions from 1906 to 1913.

Cooper writes of him:

"Barnett was born in Chacewater, Cornwall in 1852. He was an original member of the Mineralogical Society, a Fellow of the Geological Society from 1875, and President of the Royal Geological Society of Cornwall 1907–08, having been awarded their Bolitho Medal in 1906. His classes on mineralogy in 1873 led to the establishment of the Mining and Science School at Penzance of which he became Principal. He was mayor of Penzance seven times from 1906 to 1913. Active as a mineral dealer from at least 1876 to 1887 at Chyandour, Penzance, he specialized in local specimens and occasionally sold minerals brought back from Australia by "Cousin Jack." In the 1881 Census he described himself as an assayer. He is the author of the now-rare Elementary Inorganic Chemistry; lecture notes, ca. 1900."
