= Bolitho, Cornwall =

Coordinates: 50.1647°N 5.2647°W

Bolitho: Cornish: Bosleythow
- Location within Cornwall
- OS grid reference: SW6634
- Civil parish: Crowan
- Shire county: Cornwall
- Region: South West
- Country: England
- Sovereign state: United Kingdom
- Post town: Camborne
- Postcode district: TR14
- Police: Devon and Cornwall
- Fire: Cornwall
- Ambulance: South Western

Bolitho (/bəˈlaɪθoʊ/ bə-LY-thoh, Cornish: Bosleythow) is a village in west Cornwall, and a Cornish surname. The Bolitho Family own large estates in west Cornwall, United Kingdom.

The name Bolitho comes from the Cornish language words bos, meaning 'dwelling', and Leythow, a personal name.

There is also a place called Bolitho in the civil parish of Menheniot.

== Bolitho family ==
The surname Bolitho derives from this place. Some of the Bolithos were ″merchant princes″, the Bolitho family's growth to prominence started with Thomas Bolitho (1765–1868). The family were initially tanners, who moved into lime-burning and tin smelting before becoming bankers. The Bolitho Bank eventually merged with Barclays in 1905, with William Bolitho becoming the director of Barclays. The arms of Bolitho are "Ermine on a plain chevron five bezants between two chevronels engrailed and three fleurs–de–lis Sable", with the motto "Re deu". The Paschal lamb in the borough arms of Penzance derives from the tin smelting mark used by the Bolithos of Gulval.

The Old Inn, a public house in Gulval Churchtown, was given to the Coldstream Guards Association in memory of Capt. Michael Lempriere Bolitho and renamed "The Coldstreamer" (Capt. Bolitho was killed on HMS Walney, a Royal Navy sloop; her task was to crash through the boom at the entrance to Oran Harbour in Operation Torch on 8 November 1942).

Sergeant Richard Bolitho, born 19 January 1920, was a gunner in World War II and was one of the famous Dambusters of No. 617 Squadron RAF which carried out the raids on the German dams. Bolitho was killed, along with the rest of the crew, when their Avro Lancaster bomber crashed on the outward journey.

An independent school at Polwithen House in Penzance, Bolitho School, closed in 2017. It is now the Frances Bolitho Care Home.
