= George Boscawen, 9th Viscount Falmouth =

Lord-Lieutenant of Cornwall (1919–2022)

The Right Honourable The Viscount Falmouth DL

Member of the House of Lords Lord Temporal
- In office 18 February 1962 – 11 November 1999 as a hereditary peer
- Preceded by: The 8th Viscount Falmouth
- Succeeded by: Seat abolished

Personal details
- Born: George Hugh Boscawen; 31 October 1919
- Died: 7 March 2022 (aged 102)
- Party: Conservative
- Spouse: Elizabeth Price Browne (m. 1953; died 2007)
- Parent(s): Evelyn Hugh John Boscawen; Mary Margaret Desiree Meynell
- Education: Eton College
- Alma mater: Trinity College, Cambridge
- Military career
- Allegiance: United Kingdom
- Branch: British Army
- Service years: 1939–1946
- Rank: Captain
- Unit: Coldstream Guards
- Conflicts: Second World War; Italian Campaign
- Awards: Mentioned in dispatches

George Hugh Boscawen, 9th Viscount Falmouth, DL (31 October 1919 – 7 March 2022), was a British peer and landowner. His subsidiary titles were 9th Baron Boscawen-Rose and 16th Baron le Despencer (created in 1264 in the Peerage of England). An officer in the Coldstream Guards, he was Lord Lieutenant of Cornwall from 1977 to 1994.

== Life ==
Boscawen was the second son of Evelyn Hugh John Boscawen, 8th Viscount Falmouth, by his marriage to Mary Margaret Desiree, daughter of Hon. Frederick George Lindley Meynell (née Wood; in 1905 he assumed part of the married name of his sister, Emily Meynell Ingram, on inheriting estates from her), High Sheriff of Staffordshire in 1910, son of the politician Charles Wood, 1st Viscount Halifax. Mary's mother, Lady Mary Susan Felice, was a daughter of the art collector and historian Alexander Lindsay, 25th Earl of Crawford.

Like his younger brother Robert, he was educated at Eton and Trinity College, Cambridge, and from 1939 to 1946 served in the Coldstream Guards. Commissioned a second lieutenant on 2 November 1940, he was promoted war-substantive lieutenant on 2 May 1942. On 21 May 1940, Boscawen's elder brother, Hon. Evelyn Frederick Vere Boscawen, also a Coldstream Guards officer, was killed in action, leaving him as heir to the family titles and estates. During the Second World War he saw active service in Italy, for which he was mentioned in dispatches.

In 1962, he succeeded as Viscount Falmouth on the death of his father. In 1968, he was appointed a Deputy Lieutenant for Cornwall, then in 1977 became the county's Lord Lieutenant, retiring in 1994 on reaching the age of seventy-five.

In 1982, as chairman of the governing body of Truro Cathedral School, Falmouth took the decision to close the school, because of "deteriorating finances". In a letter to parents he stated that this decision had been taken "with very great reluctance, after exploring all possible alternatives".

In 1986 he served as Master of the Worshipful Company of Clockmakers, a position his father had held in 1959.

He died on 7 March 2022 at the age of 102. His funeral took place at Truro Cathedral.

== Family ==
Boscawen married Elizabeth Price Browne (1925 – 28 July 2007), who was a Deputy Lieutenant for Cornwall and an Officer of the Most Excellent Order of the British Empire; on 9 May 1953. They had four sons:

- Evelyn Arthur Hugh Boscawen, 10th Viscount Falmouth, etc. (13 May 1955). He married Lucia Vivian-Neal on 23 July 1977 and they were divorced in 1995. They have two children and two grandsons. He remarried Katharine Helen Maley on 7 October 1995. They have three children.
- Hon. Nicholas John Boscawen (14 January 1957). He married Virginia Mary Rose Beare, daughter of Robin Beare, in 1985. They have two daughters.
- Hon. Charles Richard Boscawen (10 October 1958). He married Frances Diana Rous, daughter of Major Hon. George Nathaniel Rous, in 1985. They have three children.
- Hon. Vere George Boscawen (18 September 1964). He married Catharine Halliday on 11 May 1991. They have three children.

Boscawen was succeeded by his oldest son, the Hon. Evelyn George Boscawen. All three generations, paternal grandfather, father and son, are Etonians and lived or live on and manage the Tregothnan Estate.

== Notes ==
Honorary titles
Preceded by Sir John Carew Pole	Lord Lieutenant of Cornwall; 1977–1994	Succeeded by Lady Mary Holborow
Peerage of Great Britain
Preceded by Evelyn Boscawen	Viscount Falmouth; 1962–2022; Member of the House of Lords (1962–1999)	Succeeded by Evelyn Boscawen
