= Manor of Alverton =

Former manorial estate in England

The Manor of Alverton was a former manorial estate located in the hundred of Penwith, west Cornwall, England, United Kingdom.

== History ==
The first historical details of the manor were recorded in the Domesday Book which stated that before the Norman Conquest the manor was owned by a Saxon lord known as Alward. There were 3 hides of land but Alward had paid tax only for 2 hides. There was land for 16 ploughs of which 5 were owned by the lord who had 7 serfs. 15 villeins and 25 smallholders held the rest of the land and had 8 ploughs. There was 60 acres (240,000 m^{2}) of woodland and 300 acres (1.2 km^{2}) of pasture. The livestock was 4 wild mares, 10 cattle and 180 sheep. The annual value was £20 but it had formerly paid £8. Following the conquest lordship of the manor passed to Robert, Count of Mortain, the half brother of William the Conqueror. In 1230 the manor was granted by Richard, 1st Earl of Cornwall (younger brother of King Henry III) to Henry le Tyes. The manor remained the property of the Le Tyes family until 1322 when Henry Lord Tyes took part in the revolt against King Edward II and was executed, his estate passing to his sister Alice Lisle.

Between this date and 1563 the manor passed between a number of members of the Lisle family and the crown. In 1611 the manor was sold to George and Thomas Whitmore who in turn sold it to Richard Daniell (George's wife's stepfather), a Truro merchant. By 1663 ownership of Alverton had changed hands again and was in the hands of William Keigwin whose family held Alverton until 1716 when Uriah Tonkin took up the title. In fact the Tonkin family then held on to the title of Alverton for a very long time, for almost two and a half centuries. James Jenkins (died 1710), the Cornish scholar, lived at Alverton.

When Robert Edmund Tonkin died in October 1935, his sole heir, John Franklin Tonkin, acquired the Lord of the Manors of St. Buryan and Alverton. In 1960 J F Tonkin died in New Zealand and left the Lords of the Manors of St. Buryan and Alverton to his daughter, Gillian Green. Gillian Green held these to her death in 2004 when the title of The Lord of the Manor of Alverton was passed onto her daughter Sue Bedford. In 2005 Sue Bedford died and passed the title onto Fleur Carpenter (her daughter). For a complete list of known Lords of the Manor of Alverton see below.

The manor estate itself was located largely within, and near to, the current civil parish of Penzance and included much of the settlements of Newlyn, Mousehole and Madron.

=== Relationship with Penzance ===
The manor of Alverton was influential in the history and development of Penzance; the lords of the manor secured its first charters and maintained its early harbour and market before the town received borough status in 1614. The manor of Alverton was also the owner of the site of the Penzance market house for which its titular lord continued to receive rent until 1936. The early period of Penzance's history was also defined by ongoing disputes between Penzance Town Council and the manor of Alverton including a dispute over the right to dry nets on the 'Western Green' (now Penzance promenade) and the right to grind grain within the borough boundaries.

== Lords of the Manor of Alverton ==
Below is a partial list of the holders of the title Lord of the Manor of Alverton. The dates (before 1974) are mentioned in historical documents formerly held by Penzance Borough Council and do not reflect length of ownership.

- Until 1066 Alward (a Saxon lord)
- From 1066 to 1095 Robert, Count of Mortain
- Between 1095 and 1230 vested in the ownership of the Earl of Cornwall
- After 1230 Henry Le Tyes
- Held by the Le Tyes family until 1322 when Sir Henry Tyes was hung.
- 1322 – 23 February 1327, held by the Crown.
- 1327 Alice De Lisle (sister of Sir Henry Tyes, hung in 1322.)
- 1379 – 1399 Robert, Lord Lisle
- Before 1611 James I
- 1611 – 1614 George Whitmore
- 1614 Richard Daniell
- 1635 Alexander Daniell
- 1649 Richard Daniell
- 1663 William Keigwin
- Held by the Keigwin family until 1726
- 1726 George Veale
- c. 1780 Mr. Hitchens/Capt Cuthbert Baines/Mr. Jenkin
- c. 1815 James Halse
- Later held by Uriah Tonkin
- 1936 Richard Edmund Tonkin
- 1936 – 1960 John Franklin Tonkin
- 1960 – 2004 Gillian Green
- 2004 – 2005 Sue Bedford
- 2005 – Fleur Carpenter
