= Lady Mary Holborow =

British magistrate (1936–2017)

Lady Mary Holborow DCVO

Lord Lieutenant of Cornwall
- In office 1994 – 19 September 2011
- Monarch: Elizabeth II
- Preceded by: The Viscount Falmouth
- Succeeded by: Edward Bolitho

Personal details
- Born: 19 September 1936
- Died: 9 June 2017 (aged 80)
- Spouse: Geoffrey Jermyn Holborow
- Relations: Patrick Stopford, 9th Earl of Courtown, brother
- Children: 1 daughter, 1 son

Lady Mary Christina Holborow DCVO (née Stopford; 19 September 1936 – 9 June 2017) was a British magistrate who was Lord Lieutenant of Cornwall. She was a daughter of the 8th Earl of Courtown.

On retirement as a magistrate (justice of the peace) she became the Lord Lieutenant of Cornwall and then a trustee of Cornwall Rural Community Council, the South West Lakes Trust, the National Maritime Museum, Falmouth and the TR14ers Community Dance Team Team based in Camborne. Lady Mary served as Commissioner for St John Ambulance Cornwall from 1982 until 1987, being made DStJ (1987).

In addition she was a governor of University College Falmouth, vice president of St Loye's Foundation, and president of Cornwall County Scout Council. She was also patron of the Citizens Advice Bureau Cornwall. Her work and chairmanship of the Cornwall chapter of Macmillan Cancer Relief was longstanding and especially relevant to her personal commitment to the hospice movement and health services within the county. Soon after the establishment of the Hypatia Trust, Penzance, Cornwall in 1996, she became a supportive member of its Council of Trusted Friends. She was made a bard of Gorsedh Kernow in 2012 at Camelford under the bardic name Gweresores Egloslasek/TheHelper of Ladoc. Lady Mary was appointed Dame Commander of the Royal Victorian Order (DCVO) in the 2010 Birthday Honours. She died in Cornwall on 9 June 2017.

== Family ==
On 8 August 1959, Lady Mary married Geoffrey Jermyn Holborow (died 11 August 2015); they had two children, Katherine Mary (born 1961) and Crispin (born 1963).

Honorary titles
Preceded by The Viscount Falmouth	Lord Lieutenant of Cornwall; 1994–2011	Succeeded by Edward Bolitho
