= John Robyns =

Royal Marines general (1780-1857)

Major-General John Robyns KH
- Born: 13 May 1780; Madron, Cornwall
- Died: 22 March 1857 (aged 76); Madron, Cornwall
- Military career
- Allegiance: United Kingdom
- Branch: Royal Marines
- Service years: 1796–1835
- Rank: Major-General
- Conflicts: Napoleonic Wars; Invasion of Martinique; War of 1812; Battle of Bladensburg; Burning of Washington; Battle of Baltimore; Battle of New Orleans
- Awards: Knight of the Royal Guelphic Order

Major-General John Robyns, KH (13 May 1780 – 22 March 1857) was a senior officer of the Royal Marines who served during the French Revolutionary Wars and earned historically noteworthy military distinctions on the North America and West Indies Station during the Napoleonic Wars and the War of 1812. As a battalion commander of Royal Marines, Captain John Robyns faced enemy forces which included his counterparts of the United States Marines at Bladensburg, Washington, Baltimore, and New Orleans. In his later years Robyns served one term as Mayor of Penzance (1840–41) in his native Cornwall.

== Early life and career ==
John Robyns, the son of Thomas Robyns, was christened in the Parish of Madron, in West Cornwall, on 13 May 1780. The private christening, performed by a midwife, probably occurred soon after his birth, if not on the actual day of birth.

It may be assumed that young Robyns received an adequate common school education that was sufficient to prepare him for a commission. He may have served in the Royal Navy or British Army prior to 1796. It is difficult to document this period of his life with precision.

Robyns received his commission as a second lieutenant of His Majesty's Marine Forces in 1796. Soon afterwards he was ordered to the East Indies where he remained on station nearly five years, earning his promotion to first lieutenant in 1799. Following his return, shortly prior to the Treaty of Amiens, he was sent to Ireland where he remained on station until his promotion to captain in 1807. John Robyns was thus still a subaltern when H.M. Corps of Marine Forces was elevated to the dignity of Royal Marines on 29 April 1802. In 1808 Captain Robyns of the Marines sailed for Barbados as part of the expedition under Vice Admiral Alexander Cochrane and Lieutenant General George Beckwith.

== Invasion of Martinique ==
In 1809 Captain John Robyns participated in the British Invasion of Martinique, a highly successful amphibious operation. Captain John Robyns remained on the Leeward Islands Station until about 1811, well after the seizure of Guadeloupe by the British forces under Cochrane and Beckwith.

== Chesapeake Campaign ==
Still a Marine captain, Robyns rejoined Vice Admiral Alexander Cochrane's command in 1813, as the Officer Commanding the detachment of Marines aboard HMS Albion. He was among the handful of Royal Marines company-grade officers chosen to command a battalion ashore during the War of 1812. Robyns commanded a 400-strong composite battalion of Royal Marines and Royal Navy personnel in the Battle of Bladensburg, the Burning of Washington, and in the Battle of Baltimore. At Baltimore Robyns was severely wounded while leading his battalion on 12 September 1814. The British Army commander, Major General Robert Ross, was killed in the same action.

Writing from HMS Tonnant, to the Admiralty Lords on 17 September 1814, Vice Admiral Alexander Cochrane singled out the "frequently gallant conduct" of Robyns as worthy of special "favour and protection".

== Battle of New Orleans ==
Following the defeat at Baltimore, Robyns was brevetted a major on the British Army List.

Though still recovering from a wound described as "severe," he accompanied the British expeditionary force which was sent to engage in the Battle of New Orleans. Once again charged with a composite command, he commanded a company in the "composite battalion" of 100 Marines commanded by his senior, Brevet Major Thomas Benjamin Adair (1783–1849), of the Royal Marines. Adair's 100 Royal Marines and a similar-sized party of Edward Nicolls' Red Sticks were brigaded with Colonel William Thornton (British Army officer)'s 85th Regiment of Foot (Bucks Volunteers). Thornton's Brigade performed laudably at New Orleans, overwhelming the American line on the west bank of the Mississippi. The brigade's small triumph, however, was not enough to counterbalance the British disaster of 8 January 1815.

Royal Marines also contributed to the subsequent orderly withdrawal by the British forces.

== Peacetime establishment and later years ==
In spite of the award of a pension for wounds received, Robyns escaped the officer reductions in the Royal Marines establishment of 1814 and 1816. Robyns married Miss Wilmot John (1787–1867), the second daughter of George John, of Penzance, at Madron on 18 July 1815.

Routine duties and assignments followed until his retirement in 1835. He was promoted to the substantive rank of major in the Royal Marines on 16 April 1832, thus finally attaining the permanent status of "General and Field Officer (G & FO)", Royal Marines.

In 1840 he served one term as Mayor of Penzance, a largely honorary public function.

Robyns died in Cornwall on 22 March 1857. He was buried in Madron on 27 March 1857.

== Promotions and awards ==
- Second Lieutenant, (H.M. Marine Forces) 13 March 1796.
- First Lieutenant, (H.M. Marine Forces) 1 January 1799.
- Captain, Royal Marines 19 June 1807.
  - Brevet Major, (Army List) 27 October 1814.

28 December 1815 Awarded a pension for wounds.

- Major, Royal Marines 16 April 1832.

Allowed to retire from the Royal Marines as a major with full pay in 1835.

- Knight of the Royal Guelphic Order 25 January 1836.
- 3 November 1840 War Office brevet of lieutenant colonel, on the British Army List as a "late Major" of the Royal Marines, to date from 10 January 1837. This belated and honorary brevet on the Army List occurred at the same time as that of Colonel James Home of the Royal Marines, and Lieutenant Colonel Edward Nicolls.
- 1842 Awarded a good-service pension.
- 1848/1849 Naval General Service Medal (1847) with Clasp for Invasion of Martinique (1809).
  - Colonel, (Army List) 11 November 1851.
  - Major General, (Army List) 20 June 1855.

== See also ==
- Royal Marines Battalions (Napoleonic Wars)
- Corps of Colonial Marines
- List of Mayors of Penzance
