= Lord Lieutenant of Cornwall =

Civil post in Cornwall, England

This is a list of people who have served as Lord Lieutenant of Cornwall. Since 1742, all the Lords Lieutenant have also been Custos Rotulorum of Cornwall.

== Lord Lieutenants ==
- John Russell, 1st Earl of Bedford 1552–1554
- John Bourchier, 2nd Earl of Bath 1556–?
- Francis Russell, 2nd Earl of Bedford 1584 – 28 July 1585
- jointly held: 8 August 1586 – 7 December 1587
  - Sir Francis Godolphin
  - Sir William Mohun
  - Peter Edgcumbe
  - Richard Carew
- Sir Walter Raleigh 7 December 1587 – 24 March 1603
- William Herbert, 3rd Earl of Pembroke 21 May 1604 – 10 April 1630
- Philip Herbert, 4th Earl of Pembroke 17 August 1630 – 1642
- John Robartes, 1st Earl of Radnor 1642 (Parliamentarian)
- Interregnum
- John Granville, 1st Earl of Bath 1 October 1660 – April 1696 jointly with
  - Charles Granville, 2nd Baron Granville 6 May 1691 – March 1693
- Charles Robartes, 2nd Earl of Radnor 24 April 1696 – 1702
- John Granville, 1st Baron Granville 18 June 1702 – 1705
- Sidney Godolphin, 1st Earl of Godolphin 16 April 1705 – 1710
- Laurence Hyde, 1st Earl of Rochester 15 April 1710 – 2 May 1711
- Henry Hyde, 2nd Earl of Rochester 25 October 1711 – September 1714
- Charles Robartes, 2nd Earl of Radnor 13 November 1714 – 3 August 1723
- vacant
- Richard Edgcumbe, 1st Baron Edgcumbe 29 July 1742 – 22 November 1758
- Richard Edgcumbe, 2nd Baron Edgcumbe 5 March 1759 – 10 May 1761
- George Edgcumbe, 1st Earl of Mount Edgcumbe 22 June 1761 – 4 February 1795
- Richard Edgcumbe, 2nd Earl of Mount Edgcumbe 17 April 1795 – 26 September 1839
- Sir William Salusbury-Trelawny, 8th Baronet 30 December 1839 – 15 November 1856
- Charles Vivian, 2nd Baron Vivian 17 December 1856 – 1877
- William Edgcumbe, 4th Earl of Mount Edgcumbe 6 November 1877 – 25 September 1917
- John Charles Williams 24 January 1918 – 1936
- Sir Edward Hoblyn Warren Bolitho 17 February 1936 – 1962
- Sir John Gawen Carew Pole, 12th Baronet 29 August 1962 – 1977
- George Boscawen, 9th Viscount Falmouth 1977–1994
- Lady Mary Holborow 10 November 1994 – 19 September 2011
- Colonel Sir Edward Bolitho 19 September 2011 – present

== Deputy lieutenants ==
A deputy lieutenant of Cornwall is commissioned by the Lord Lieutenant of Cornwall. Deputy lieutenants support the work of the lord-lieutenant. There can be several deputy lieutenants at any time, depending on the population of the county. Their appointment does not terminate with the changing of the lord-lieutenant, but they usually retire at age 75.

=== 18th-century ===
- 11 December 1792: John Thomas
- 11 December 1792: John Lemon
- 11 December 1792: David Howell
- 11 December 1792: George Bickford
- 11 December 1792: Walter Raleigh Gilbert
- 11 December 1792: Edward Archer
- 11 December 1792: John Penhallow Peters
- 11 December 1792: William Clode
- 15 February 1793: John Trevenen
- 15 February 1793: Thomas Bennett
- 15 February 1793: Arthur Kempe

=== 19th-century ===
- 27 May 1840: Carteret John Williams Ellis. Esq
- 29 March 1848: Edward Archer
- 1876 William Maskell
