= Tregavarah =

Hamlet in west Cornwall, England

Coordinates: 50°06′47″N 5°34′31″W

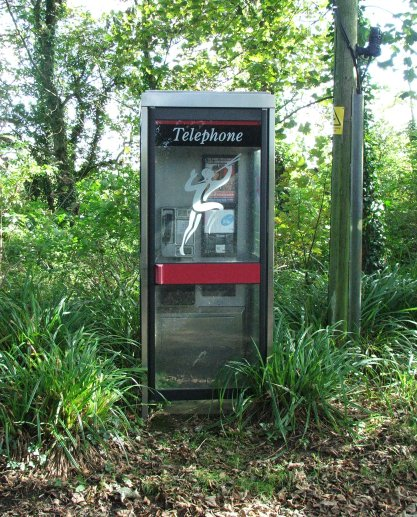
Tregavarah phonebox

Tregavarah (Cornish: Tregenvorow) (grid reference SW445298) is a small hamlet in the parish of Madron in west Cornwall, England, U K. It is approximately 2 miles west of Penzance. Tregavarah Downs is nearby.

== Toponymy ==
Previous spellings of the name include Tregeuvoro (in 1262 and 1327), Tregouvoro (1316), Tregovarra (1316 and 1384), Tregewore (1345), Tregufora (1386), Tregevora (1451), Tregovara (1688) and Tregavara from the Tithe Apportionment. The spelling of the name remained Tregavara in The Cornishman newspaper which reported on the re-opening services of the Wesleyan chapel on 22 August 1880. In June 1886 over £80 was raised in a bazaar, which provided a new harmonium and the balance going towards the fund for enlarging the vestry.
