= List of mayors of Penzance =

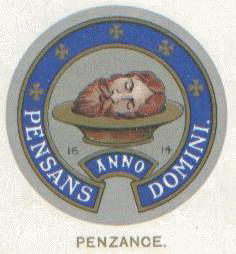
Penzance Borough Arms, 1614–1934 (used on the Civic Regalia of the Mayor of Penzance)

The office of Mayor of Penzance was established under the Penzance Charter of incorporation of 1614 granted by James I. This charter allowed for the appointment of 12 assistants and eight aldermen to govern the town one of whom who would be chosen as Mayor at the start of each civic year. Under the charter the Mayor of Penzance was the Chief Executive of the town as well as its chief magistrate. In 1832 this arrangement was abolished under the Municipal Corporations Act 1835 the role of Mayor at this time was largely reduced to 'first citizen' and Chairman of the Town Council the executive functions being passed to the Town clerk. In 1974 following the abolition of Penzance Borough Council under the Local Government Act 1972 the position of Mayor become a purely ceremonial one, the Mayor being chosen from Penzance members of the newly created Penwith District Council, this was further altered in 1980 when the Penzance Town Council was created. The Penzance current civic year and Mayoral term of office is from May to May the following year.

This list is taken from Peter A. S. Pool's History of the Borough of Penzance and from information held by Penzance Town Council.

== Mayors of the Original Borough of Penzance 1614–1836 ==
- 1614 John Madern (details of his memorial at Madron church )
- 1615 John Clies (details of his memorial at Madron church )
- 1616–1619 (no records)
- 1620–1621 Roger Polkinhorne
- 1622 No record
- 1623 James Bonithon
- 1624 Thomas Millard
- 1625–1629 (no records)
- 1630 William Norsworthy
- 1631 Nicholas Madren
- 1632 (no record)
- 1633 Roger Polkinghorne
- 1634 (no record)
- 1635 William Madderne
- 1636 Nicholas Shearme
- 1637–1638 (no records)
- 1639 William Norsworthy
- 1640 Robert Feny
- 1641–1642 (no record)
- 1643–1644 Nicholas Shearme
- 1645 Anthony Gubbes
- 1646 John Games
- 1647 Nicholas Shearme
- 1648–1659 (no records)
- 1650 Philip Lanyon
- 1651–1652 Joseph Gubbes
- 1653 Thomas Grosse
- 1654 Thomas Games
- 1655 John Tremenheere
- 1656 Anthony Gubbes
- 1657 Nicholas John
- 1658 Walter Fynny
- 1659 Joseph Gubbs
- 1660 Nicholas Shearme
- 1661 Thomas Grosse
- 1662 Martin Maddren
- 1663 John Keigwin
- 1664 Thomas Benmer
- 1665 John Loase
- 1666 Richard Veale
- 1667 Thomas Chirgwin
- 1668 Nicholas Shearme
- 1669 Thomas Grosse
- 1670 Martin Maddern and John Keigwin
- 1671 Thomas Benmer
- 1672 Robert Harry
- 1673 James Loase
- 1674 Henry Tremenheere
- 1675 James Penhallow
- 1676 Thomas Grosse
- 1677 Thomas Grosse, jun.
- 1678 Robert Harry
- 1679 Thomas Benmer
- 1680 James Lose
- 1681 John Trevethan
- 1682 Henry Tremenheere
- 1683 William Pearce
- 1684 John Grosse
- 1685 Peter Jenkin
- 1686 John Tremenheere
- 1687 Richard Usticke
- 1688 James Lose
- 1689 Richard Pearce
- 1690 John Tremenheere
- 1691 Peter Jenkin
- 1692 George Richards
- 1693 Thomas Eaistlake
- 1694 Richard Pearce
- 1695 John Grosse
- 1696 John Pellow
- 1697 John Tremenheere
- 1698–1699 Daniel Hawkey
- 1700 Samuel Williams
- 1701 John Pellowe
- 1702 Daniel Hawkey
- 1703 John Carveth (disputed election)
- 1706 William Tonkin; (died in Office) from October, Daniel Hawkey
- 1707 John Pellow
- 1708 William Tonkin
- 1709 Samuel Williams
- 1710 Daniel Hawkey
- 1711 John Pellowe
- 1712 William Tonkin
- 1713 Samuel Williams
- 1714 Daniel Hawkey
- 1715 John Pellowe
- 1716 William Tonkin
- 1717 James Hawkey
- 1718 Thomas Pellowe
- 1719 Samuel Williams
- 1720 John Pellowe
- 1721 William Tonkin
- 1722 Uriah Tonkin
- 1723 James Hawkey
- 1724 Thomas Pellowe
- 1725 Samuel Williams
- 1726 William Tonkin
- 1727 Uriah Tonkin
- 1728 Thomas Pellowe
- 1729 George Treweeke
- 1730 William John
- 1731 James Tremenheere
- 1732 George Borlase
- 1733 Henry Hichens
- 1734 Uriah Tonkin
- 1735 Thomas Pellowe
- 1736 George Treweeke
- 1737 William John
- 1738 George Borlase
- 1739 James Tremenheere
- 1740 Henry Hichens
- 1741 Uriah Tonkin
- 1742 George Treweeke
- 1743 William John
- 1744 George Borlase
- 1745 Henry Hichens
- 1746 William Veale
- 1747 Christopher Pender
- 1748 Uriah Tonkin
- 1749 George Treweeke
- 1750 George Borlase
- 1751 Henry Hichens
- 1752 William Veale
- 1753 James Tonkin
- 1754 William John
- 1755 George Treweeke, jun.
- 1756 Walter Borlase
- 1757 Uriah Tonkin
- 1758 George Borlase
- 1759 Henry Hichens
- 1760 John Tonkin
- 1761 William John
- 1762 George Treweeke
- 1763 Uriah Tonkin
- 1764 George Borlase
- 1765 Walter Borlase
- 1766 George Treweeke
- 1767 James Tonkin
- 1768 John Price
- 1769 John Pender
- 1770 John Tonkin (convicted for smuggling during his mayoral year)
- 1771 George Treweeke
- 1772 James Tonkin
- 1773 John Pender
- 1774 John Tonkin
- 1775 John Price
- 1776 John Beard
- 1777 George Treweeke
- 1778 James Tonkin
- 1779 John Price
- 1780 John Tonkin
- 1781 George Treweeke
- 1782 Thomas Giddy
- 1783 James Tonkin
- 1784 John Beard
- 1785 Thomas Giddy
- 1786 Thomas John
- 1787 John Tonkin
- 1788 John Price
- 1789 John Batten
- 1790 Thomas Giddy
- 1791 John Tremenheere
- 1792 Thomas Giddy
- 1793 John Batten
- 1794 John Beard
- 1795 John Batten
- 1796 Thomas Giddy
- 1797 John Tremenheere
- 1798 John Batten
- 1799 John Beard
- 1800 John Batten, jun.
- 1801 Thomas Giddy
- 1802 John Batten
- 1803 John Batten, jun.
- 1804 John Giddy
- 1805 Thomas Giddy
- 1806 Richard Jewell Ferris
- 1807 John Batten, jun.
- 1808 Thomas Giddy
- 1809 Benjamin Carne Branwell
- 1810 John Bingham Borlase
- 1811 Thomas Giddy
- 1812 George John
- 1813 John Batten
- 1814 Richard Jewell Ferris
- 1815 Thomas Giddy
- 1816 Henry Boase
- 1817 Henry Penneck
- 1818 George John
- 1819 Edward Collins Giddy
- 1820 John Jones Pearce
- 1821 Edward Collins Giddy
- 1822 John Jones Pearce
- 1823 Edward Collins Giddy
- 1824 John Batten
- 1825 Edward Collins Giddy
- 1826 Henry Penneck
- 1827 Edward Collins Giddy
- 1828 Joseph Nichols
- 1829 Edward Collins Giddy
- 1830 Robert Richards
- 1831 Edward Collins Giddy
- 1832 John Batten
- 1833 Robert Richards
- 1834 Richard Jewell Ferris
- 1835 Richard Jewell Ferris, to 1 January

== Mayors of the reformed borough of Penzance 1836–1932 ==
- 1836 William Davy, from 1 January to 9 November (due to change in dates of the Civic Year); kinsman of Sir Humphry Davy
- 1836 John Batten, elected 9 November
- 1837 Richard Pearce
- 1838 Richard Moyle
- 1839 John Batten
- 1840 John Robyns
- 1841 Richard Longfield Davies
- 1842 Richard Pearce
- 1843 John Batten
- 1844 Samuel Pidwell
- 1845 Edward Bolitho
- 1846 Thomas Simon Bolitho
- 1847 Richard Pearce
- 1848 John Nicholas Richards Millett
- 1849 Samuel Pidwell
- 1850 Robert Branwell
- 1851 Richard Pearce
- 1852 Thomas Simon Bolithio
- 1853 Samuel Higgs
- 1854 Delbœuf Baker Bedford
- 1855 Walter Borlase
- 1856 Thomas Coulson
- 1857 William Davies Mathews
- 1858 Richard Pearce
- 1859 Francis Boase
- 1860 Samuel Higgs
- 1861 William Davies Mathews
- 1862 Rowland Augustus Griffiths Davies
- 1863 Rowland Augustus Griffiths Davies and William Davies Mathews (unknown details of election)
- 1864 Francis Boase
- 1865 John Richards Branwell
- 1866–1867 Francis Boase
- 1868 John Richards Branwell
- 1869 Nicholas Berriman Downing
- 1870 Francis Boase
- 1871 John Richards Branwell
- 1872 Henry Coulson York
- 1873 Francis Boase
- 1874–1875 William Henry Rodd
- 1876 Francis Boase
- 1877–1879 Charles Campbell Ross
- 1880 Francis Boase
- 1881 Charles Campbell Ross
- 1882 Richard Victor
- 1883 Charles Campbell Ross (also MP for the St Ives (UK Parliament constituency) )
- 1884 R. R. Victor
- 1885–1886 Wellington Dale
- 1887 Robert Hawker Preston
- 1888 Walter Borlase
- 1889 William Rowe
- 1890 Henry Michell
- 1891 James Caldwell
- 1892–1894 William Julyan
- 1895 William Bazeley
- 1896 Thomas Reynolds
- 1897 W. H. Julyan
- 1898–1899 Richard Pearce Couch
- 1900 James Herbet Tonking
- 1901 William Colenso (nephew of William Colenso and cousin to John William Colenso)
- 1902 Joseph Vivian Thomas (Liberal)
- 1903 John Banfield
- 1904–1905 James Henry Bennetts
- 1906–1910 Andrew Ketcham Barnett
- 1911 Howell Mabbott
- 1912–1913 Andrew Ketcham Barnett (died in office)
- 1913–1919 George Poole
- 1920 Charles Venning
- 1921 Howell Mabbott
- 1922–1924 Clement Stuchbery
- 1925 William Lane
- 1926 Clement Stuchbery
- 1927 Howell Mabbott
- 1926 Clement Stuchbery
- 1928–1929 William George Goodfellow
- 1930–1931 Richard Hall
- 1932 Joseph Walter Meek

== Mayors of the enlarged Borough 1932–1974 ==
(Penzance borough from this period includes, Heamoor, Gulval, Newlyn, and Mousehole.)

- 1932–1934 Joseph Walter Meek
- 1935–1936 Robert Thomas
- 1937–1939 John Birch
- 1940 Robert Thomas
- 1941–1942 Edward Charles Harvey
- 1943–1945 Robert Thomas
- 1946–1949 James Thomas Trezise (until May 1949)
- 1949–George Edwards
- 1950 – Thurston Lane
- 1951–1952 Frederick George Ford
- 1953–1954 John Stanley Stephens
- 1955 – Agatha Ursula Chirgwin (first female mayor of Penzance)
- 1956 – J. F. W. Bennett
- 1957–1959 Samuel Tucker Peak
- 1960–1961 Richard Charles Matthews
- 1962–1963 Lillian Garstin
- 1964–1966 Alfred Beckerleg
- 1967–1968 John Raymond Nicholas
- 1969–1970 John Cyril Mann
- 1971 – Dr Wilfrid John Turney
- 1972–1974 David Pooley (last Borough Mayor)

== Charter Trustee Mayors 1974–1980 and Penzance Town Mayors 1981 onwards ==
Charter Trustee Mayors

- 1974–1975 H. L. Richardson
- 1975–1976 J. B. Batten
- 1976–1978 R. A. Berryman
- 1978–1979 L. Spargo
- 1979–1980 J. B. Batten

Penzance Town Mayors

- 1980–1982 J. C. Laity (last Borough Deputy Mayor and first Town Mayor)
- 1981–1983 Tim Richards
- 1983–1985 M. H. T. Beckerleg
- 1984–1986 Major Ron Pearce
- 1986–1988 Michael Richard Cotton – Independent
- 1988–1989 Jeremy Drew – Independent
- 1989–1991 Brian J. Speigelhalter – Liberal Democrat
- 1991–1993 Jack H. Dixon – Liberal Democrat
- 1993–1994 Geoff Venn – Conservative
- 1994–1996 Primrose May – Independent
- 1996–1998 Caroline A. C. White – Liberal Democrat
- 1999–2001 William John Aitken – Independent
- 2001–2002 Michael Richard Cotton – Independent
- 2002–2003 Sylvia Ruth Simpson – Labour Party
- 2003–2005 Simon John Reed – Liberal Democrat
- 2005–2007 Dennis John Axford – Liberal Democrat
- 2007–2008 Frank Granger – Mebyon Kernow
- 2008–2010 Roy Mann – Independent
- 2010–2012 Jan Ruhrmund – Liberal Democrat
- 2012–2014 Phil Rendle – Mebyon Kernow
- 2014–2016 David Nebesnuick – Independent
- 2016–2017 Michael Lovegrove – Independent
- 2017–2019 Richard Cliffe – Independent
- 2019–2021 Nicole Broadhurst – Labour Party
- 2021-2023 Jonathan How - Green Party
- 2023 - 2026 Stephen Reynolds - Independent
- 2026 - Present Andy Law - Liberal Democrat
