= Trengwainton Garden =

National Trust garden in Cornwall, England

- Trengwenton (Cornish)
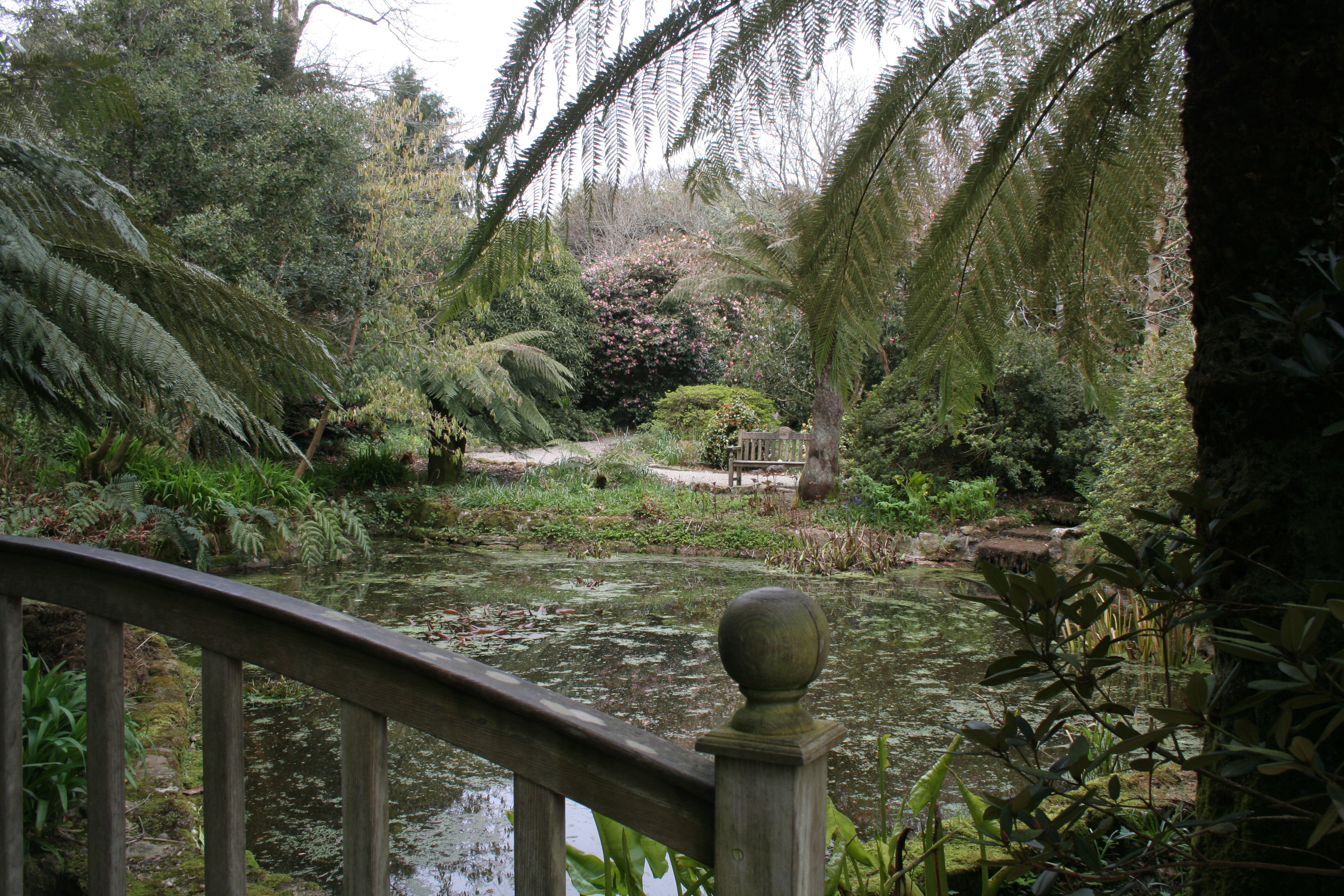

- Location within Cornwall
- 50.1285°N 5.5745°W
- Location: Madron, Cornwall, England

Site notes
- Owner: Colonel Sir Edward Bolitho (house); National Trust (garden)

National Register of Historic Parks and Gardens
- Official name: Trengwainton
- Designated: 11 June 1987
- Reference no.: 1000657

Listed Building – Grade II
- Official name: Trengwainton House
- Designated: 7 September 1988
- Reference no.: 1136818

Trengwainton (Cornish: Trengwenton, meaning farmstead of the springtime) is a garden situated in Madron, near Penzance, Cornwall, England, UK, which has been in the ownership of the National Trust since 1961. The garden is noted for its collection of exotic trees and shrubs and offers views over Mount's Bay and The Lizard. The house is not open to the public.

== History ==
First mentioned in 1319 as Trethigwaynton, the name comes from the Cornish language gwenton (springtime). The current dwelling has been on the site since at least the 16th century and was altered and extended in the 18th and 19th centuries. The house is a grade II listed building. The walled garden, which was built in Elizabethan times, seems to have been constructed as a response to the period of persistently cooler weather known as the Maunder Minimum. The wall prevented warm air from escaping from the garden on cool nights, thereby allowing frost-sensitive fruit trees to survive, despite the cooling climate.

In 1814 the estate was bought by Rose Price the son of a Jamaican sugar plantation owner. Trengwainton was sold following the loss of income resulting from the 1833 Emancipation Act which freed slaves on the family's Worthy Estate in Jamaica. In 1867 the property was bought by Thomas Simon Bolitho. In 1877 it was inherited by his son Thomas Robins Bolitho. He extended it with several rooms in 1880; and in 1925 he bequeathed it to his nephew, Edward Hoblyn Warren Bolitho. Rose Price planted trees and built the walled gardens, which are said to be based on the dimensions of Noah's Ark, and in 1925 Edward Bolitho and his head gardener Alfred Creek continued the development of the garden. They were opened to the public, for the first time, in 1931. The Victoria Medal of Honour for Horticulture was awarded to Edward in 1961 and in the same year he donated 98 acres to the National Trust, who also acquired the house, "with provision for the family to remain in residence"

== Speed Hill Climb ==
Held bi-annually, each Easter Monday and August Bank Holiday, from 1946 until 1974, the Trengwainton Speed Hill Climb (grid reference SW443311) was an event organised by the West Cornwall Motor Club. The aim of the climb was for a car, motorbike, or a motorbike and sidecar to ascend the twisting course, from a standing start, as quickly as possible. Fastest times recorded include 21.79 seconds by Roy Opie of Stithians on an Ariel 500 and 22.34 seconds by WC Cuff in a Cooper-Daimler. The event regularly attracted 2,000 spectators.
