= Madron (saint) =

Saint Madron or Maddern was a Pre-Congregational Saint, monk and hermit.

== Life ==
He is honoured in Cornwall at St Maddern's Church in the village of Madron. He also has a Holy well, noted for its healing powers.

Madron was born in Cornwall and was a disciple of Saint Ciarán of Saigir. Very little is known of him except that many miracles were attributed to him. He died c.545 AD near Land's End, Cornwall, and is remembered in Madron Parish Church (Madron Village) and his Feast Day is 17 May.

== Identification ==
Some have suggested that the saint's life is a retelling of the story of St. Madrun, a daughter of Vortimer, a king of Gwent.

== Gallery ==
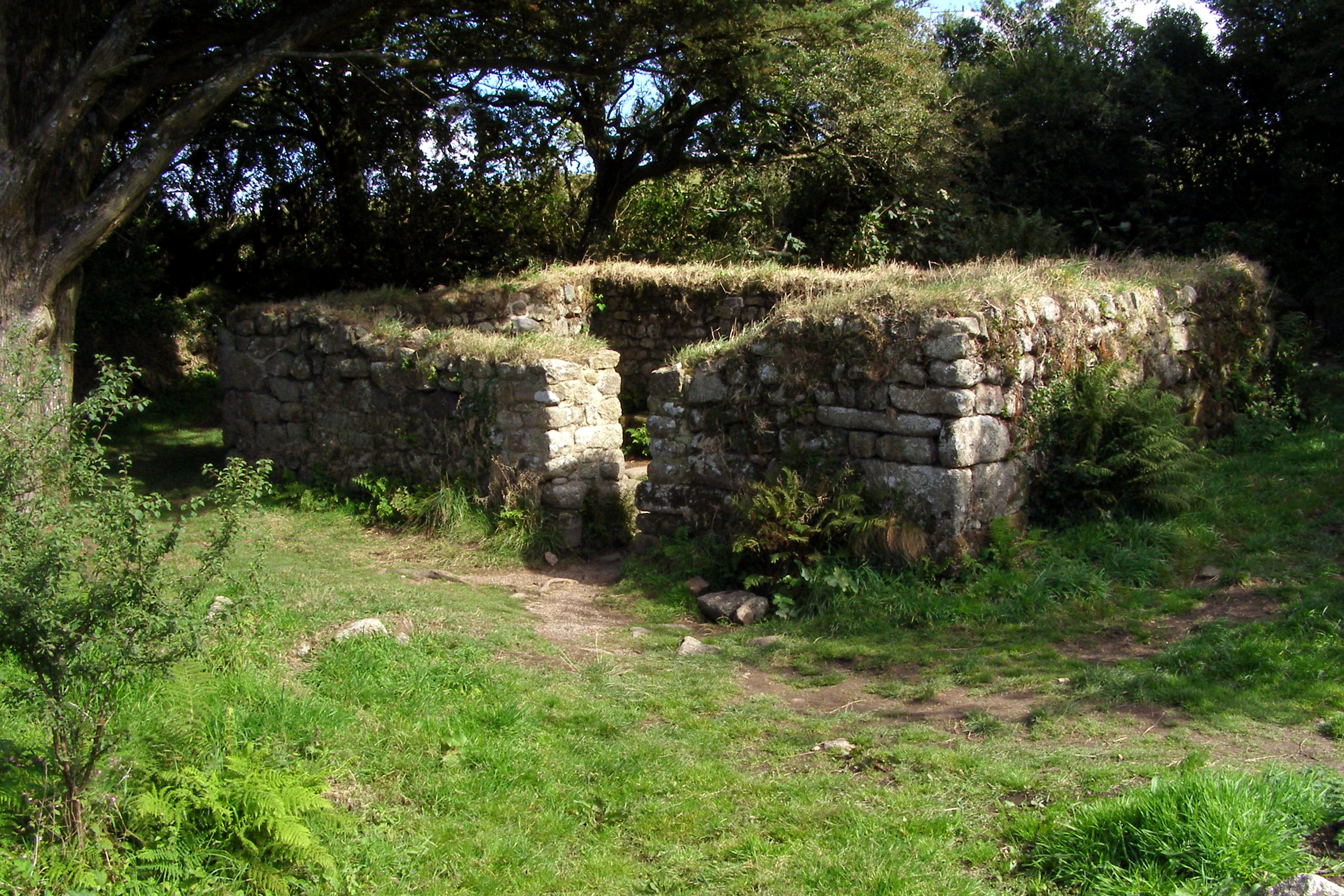
The baptistry near Madron Well

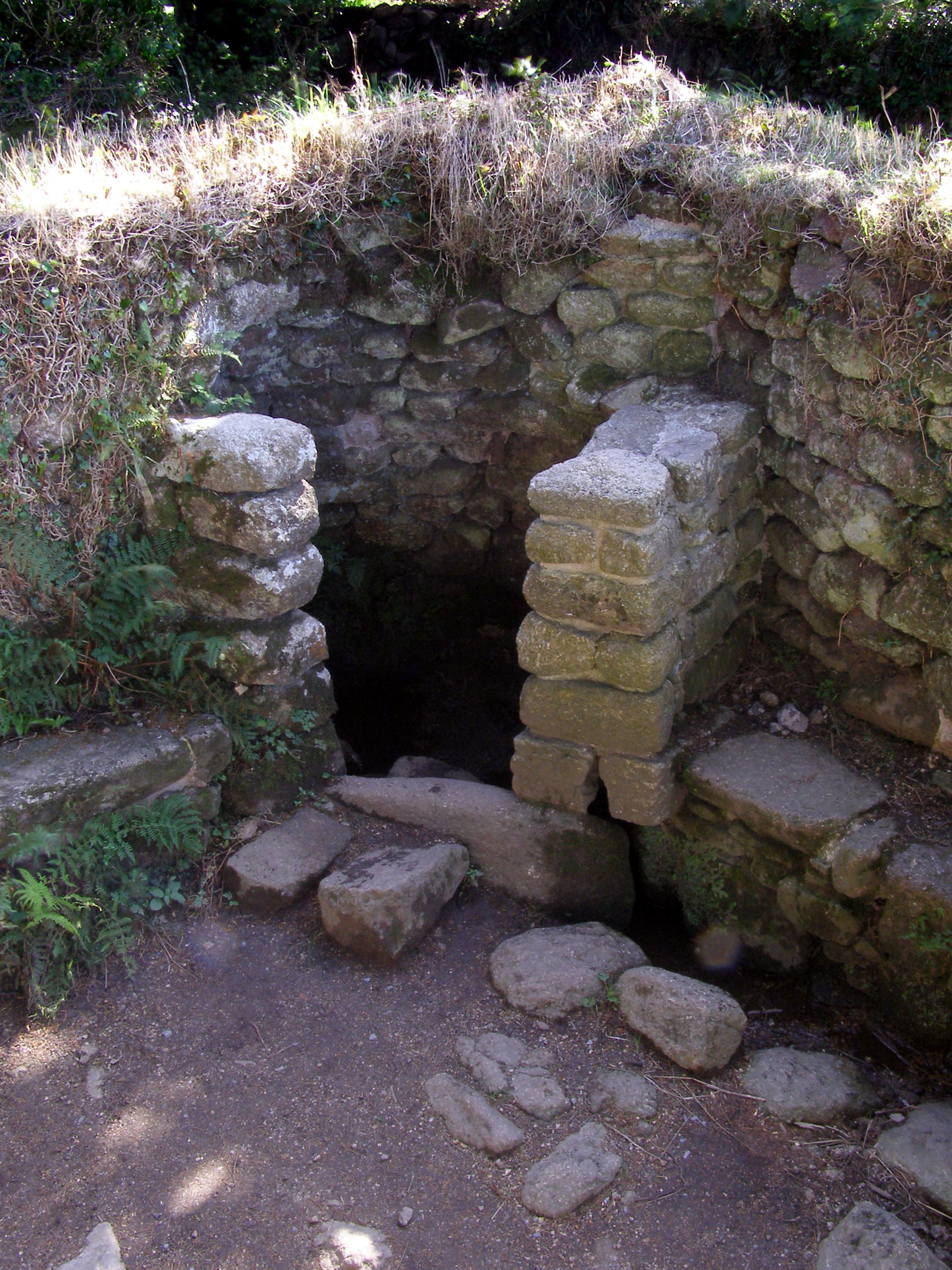
Basin in the south-west corner of the baptistry

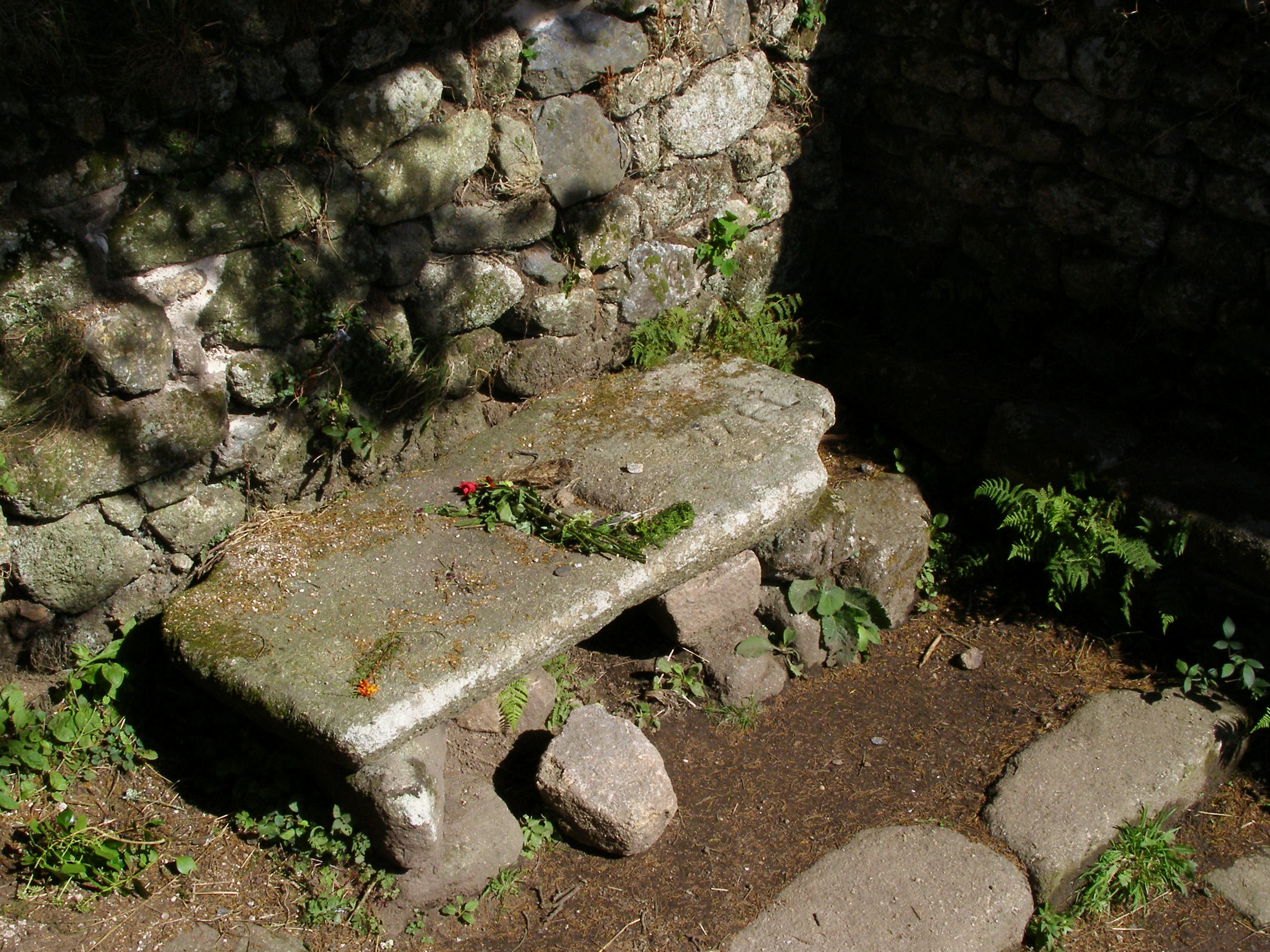
The altar at the eastern end of the baptistry

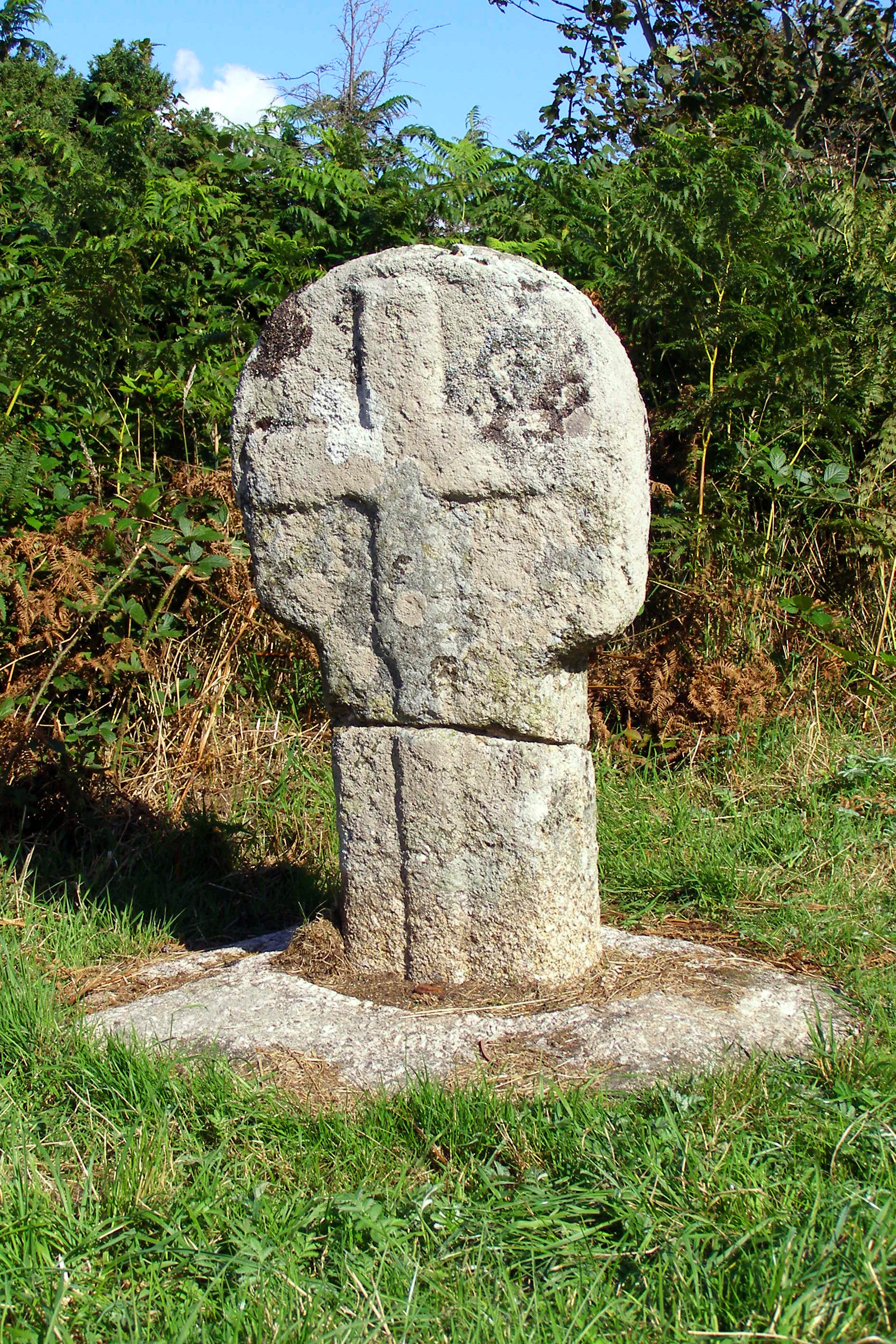
A wayside cross, Boswarthen (near Madron Well)
