= St Maddern's Church, Madron =

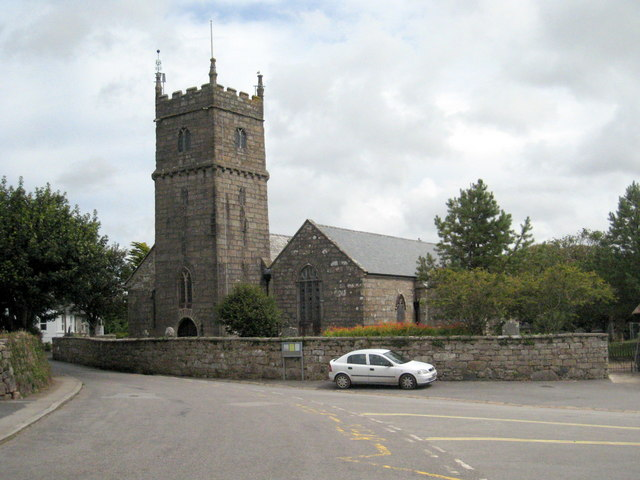
- St Maddern's Church, Madron
- 50°7′53.81″N 5°33′53.59″W
- OS grid reference: SW 45343 31813
- Location: Madron
- Country: England
- Denomination: Church of England
- Churchmanship: Broad Church

History
- Dedication: St Maddern
- Consecrated: 1336

Administration
- Province: Canterbury
- Diocese: Truro
- Archdeaconry: Cornwall
- Deanery: Penwith
- Parish: Madron
- Location within Cornwall

Listed Building – Grade I
- Official name: Church of St Maddern
- Designated: 10 June 1954
- Reference no.: 1312533

St Maddern's Church is the parish church of Madron, near Penzance in Cornwall and was once the mother church of Morvah and Penzance. It is a Grade I listed building.

== Architecture ==
The church is a large building of the 15th century; however it retains some 14th century work in the chancel. The font bowl (disused) is said to be Norman and there are a few old bench ends.

== History ==
Early history In the 12th century the church and estate of Landithy (no doubt formerly a Celtic monastery) were given by one of the Pomeroys to the Knights Hospitallers. A vicarage was established in 1278.

The consecration of Madron Church was performed by the Bishop of Exeter who travelled from Exeter with two archdeacons, the chancellor of the cathedral and the Lord Prior of the Knights of St. John in London; with them also travelled an entourage of clergymen, knights, grooms and servants. This was not a specific journey to Madron by the Bishop, he had 14 other churches to consecrate on that summer tour in 1336. as well as a quiet word with some rebellious parishioners in St Buryan. (The dedication is sometimes given as a male saint, Madernus.)

Early Tudor period The church was not finished until 1500 by which time the vicar Benedict Tregos was probably worrying about having backed Perkin Warbeck when he landed at Whitesand Bay, Sennen in 1497 proclaiming himself Richard IV. Warbeck came to a traitor's end and Tregos avoided the wrath of Henry VII and the charge of treason by paying for the north aisle himself, decorating the church in Tudor roses and placing the king's arms on expensive panelling. He succeeded and died peacefully many years later. The church contains the brass of John Clies and family, 1623.

Restoration A list of the cost of repairing pews in 1837 illustrates the point that persons of substance in the parish had their own personal pews while one must assume that the general populace stood at the rear. By 1855 it was decided "that it is most desirable that an effort be made to restore Madron Church to a condition worthy of the sacred purpose for which it was built." To do this all the old pews were removed and uniform pews set in their place. Heating and lighting were added and the chancel re-floored. By 1889 the church emerged looking much as it does today.

=== Church bells ===
The set of bells that punctuate life around the church, were first mounted in the church tower in the early 18th century. At that time there were only three bells, however, in 1761 the village decided to sell these three bells and invest in a new peal of five bells. These were ordered from the Bayley foundry in Bridgwater. The third bell caused much trouble and was sent back to be re-cast. It still was not right and was re-cast again in Helston, and yet again in Loughborough. A further two others were still unsatisfactory and were re-cast at Hayle Foundry in 1823. This situation prevailed until 1898 when it was decided that they needed renovation. By happenstance this coincided with Queen Victoria’s diamond jubilee and a sixth bell, a treble was added. The seventh and eighth bells were added in 1950 and the entire peal re-dedicated on 3 March 1951. The peal that rings out over Madron today is:

Bell Specifications
| | weight | inscription | founded |
| | (cwts, qtrs, lbs) | | |
|---|---|---|---|
| 1 | 3-2-19 = 411 pounds (186 kg) | “In memory of John Kemp White, 1867–1947, Choirmaster and organist. His children’s gift” | 1950 |
| 2 | 4-0-0 = 448 pounds (203 kg) | “The gift of the Truro Diocesan Guild of Ringers. In memory of John Symons MRCS.” | 1950 |
| 3 | 4-0-5 = 453 pounds (205 kg) | “God save our Queen and church. William Borlase Tremenheere, vicar.” | 1898 |
| 4 | 4-2-23 = 527 pounds (239 kg) | “Number 3” | 1761 |
| 5 | 4-2-27 = 531 pounds (241 kg) | "Rev. Michael Nowell Peters (vicar), P. Kempe (churchwarden)." | Recast Loughborough 1842 |
| 6 | 4-3-3 = 535 pounds (243 kg) | “Rev. W. Tremenheere (vicar), Jas. Glasson (churchwarden).” | Re-cast Hayle 1823 |
| 7 | 6-3-15 = 771 pounds (350 kg) | “Number 2.” | Re-cast Hayle 1823 |
| 8 | 9-2-8 = 1,072 pounds (486 kg) | “Walter Borlase (vicar), Thos. Jenkin (churchwarden).” | 1761 |

=== Organ ===
The church contains a two manual pipe organ by Hele and Co. A specification of the organ can be found on the National Pipe Organ Register.

== Churchyard ==
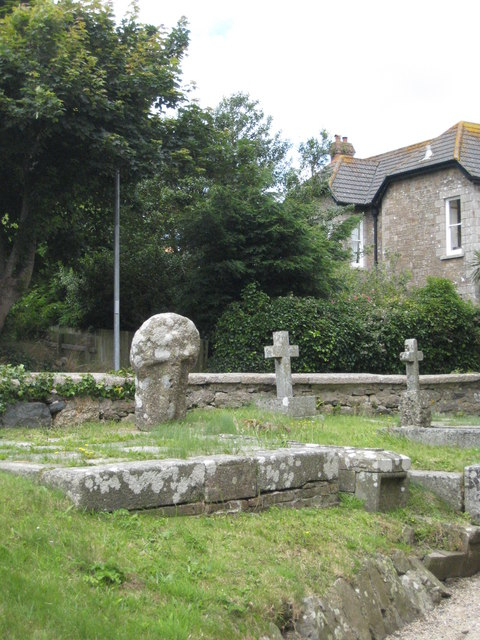
A Cornish cross in the churchyard

By 1820, the circular acre around the church had filled with the remains of deceased parishioners and it was decided that the churchyard would need to be extended. The work that this involved was extensive and involved extending to the north which in turn involved demolishing a cottage and compensating the leaseholder, diverting the stream from Madron Well and raising the ground level 6 feet to meet the general level. It was not until 1828 that this work was completed and the new burial ground consecrated by the Bishop of Exeter. The total cost of this was £369 11s 6d. Ironically the churchyard was full again by 1878 and the church side of Madron cemetery consecrated the following year by Edward White Benson, the Bishop of the new diocese of Truro. The architect Edmund Sedding is buried here.

=== Rose-Price mausoleum ===
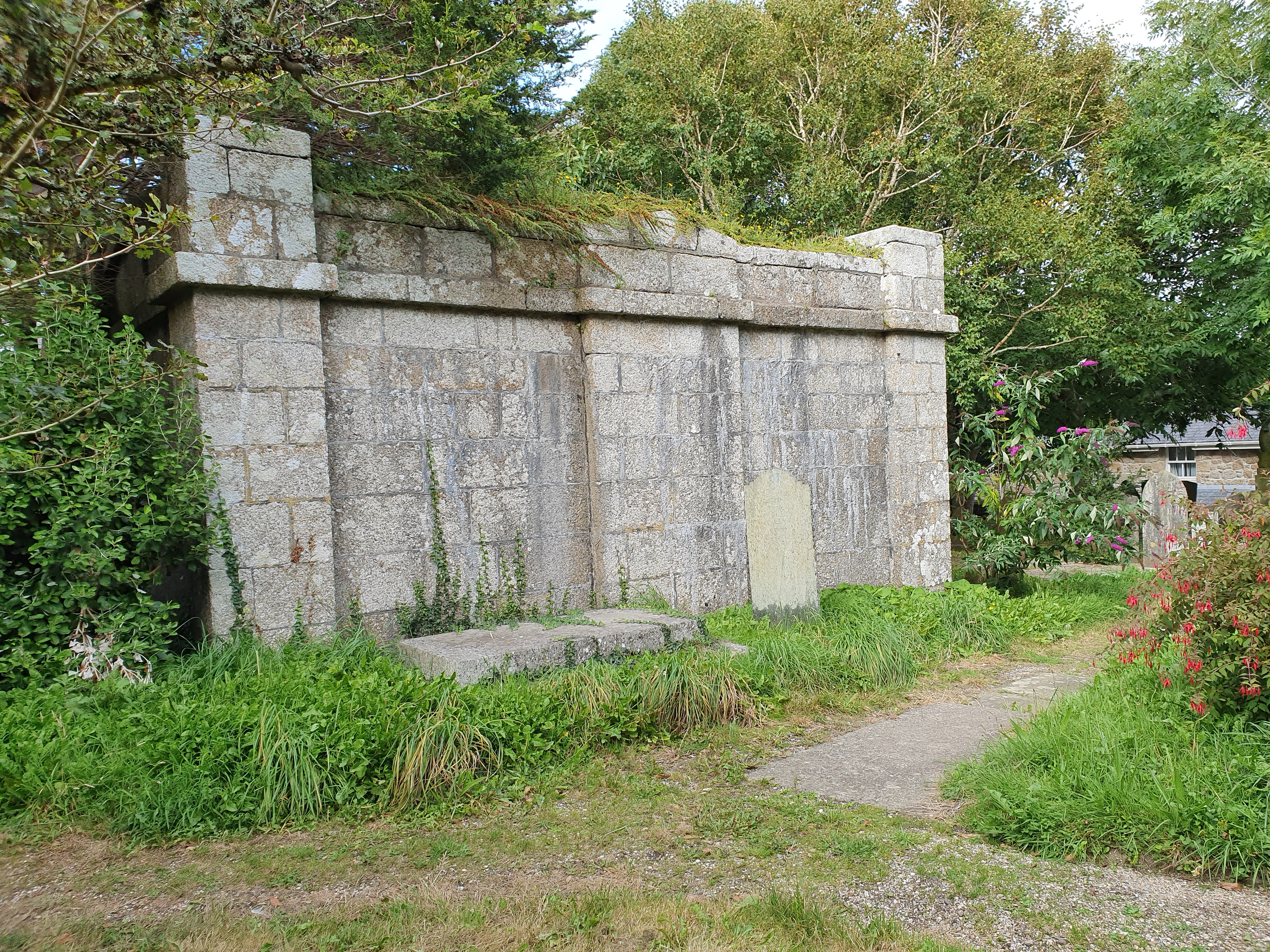
The Rose-Price mausoleum from the south

To the north-east of the church is the grade II listed granite ashlar mausoleum for the Rose-Price family of Trengwainton. The mausoleum was reopened, for the first time in nearly half-a-century, on 30 January 1881 for the burial of Mrs Louisa Douglas Nugent (22 December 1814 – 18 December 1881), 12th child (of 14) and 5th daughter of the first baron. A report in The Cornishman newspaper describes the ″.... gloomy-looking huge mausoleum ... was once more opened, block by block on Friday; the oaken panels inside it were unlocked (the bright key turning in the wards quite easily, though the edges and some other parts of this stalwart door shew marks of decay;) the iron bar which rests against the interior of the oak defence was raised; ...″. Inside there are slabs of ″Yorkshire stone″ with room for eighteen coffins below a brick-lined dome, and a vault with room for another six. Engraved on a granite block was ″Sir Rose Price, Bart., erected this tomb Anno 1827.″ Buried within is Sir Rose Price (1834), his wife Lady Price, eldest son, Rose Lambert Price (1799–1824), his wife Catherine, Countess of Desard (died 16 January 1826) and Louisa Douglas Nugent.
