= Thomas Robins Bolitho =

Cornish banker and landowner

- Born: 13 September 1840; Penzance, Cornwall, England
- Died: 28 September 1925 (aged 85); Penzance, Cornwall, England
- Education: Harrow School
- Alma mater: Corpus Christi College, Oxford
- Occupations: Banker; High Sheriff of Cornwall (1890)
- Organisation: Barclays Bank
- Relatives: Thomas Bedford Bolitho (cousin); Edward Hoblyn Warren Bolitho (nephew)

Thomas Robins Bolitho JP DL (13 September 1840 – 28 September 1925) was a Cornish banker and landowner who served as High Sheriff of Cornwall in 1890.

== Early life and education ==
Bolitho was born on 13 September 1840 in Penzance, the son of Thomas Simon Bolitho (1808–1877) and Elizabeth Robins. The Bolithos were an old Cornish family from Madron that found its fortune in trading and banking. By 1885, they were known as the "merchant princes" of Cornwall. He was educated at Harrow School and at Corpus Christi College, Oxford.

== Career ==
He joined his family's banking company, Robins, Foster, Coode and Bolitho Co., in 1880, and was a director from 1887; when that company was taken over by Barclays Bank in 1905, he became a director of the latter.

He was married to Augusta Jane Wilson on 30 June 1870, in Westminster. In 1877, he inherited Trengwainton, a country house near Penzance, from his father.

He served as the High Sheriff of Cornwall in 1890.

Bolitho retired from Barclays in 1918 and died on 28 September 1925, without issue. He left Trengwainton to his nephew, Edward Hoblyn Warren Bolitho. (Note: Since 1961 Trengwainton has been in the ownership of the National Trust for England, "with provision for the family to remain in residence")

His cousin, Thomas Bedford Bolitho (1835–1915), a Liberal Unionist, was MP for St. Ives from 1887 to 1900. (Note: Thomas Bedford Bolitho's father, Edward Bolitho (1804–1890) was the brother of Thomas Simon Bolitho (1808–1877).)

== Legacy ==
The Thomas Simon Bolitho Institute was established in Landithy some time between 1909 and 1920.

The Great Western Railway's 'Saint' class locomotive number 173 (later 2973), was named Robins Bolitho upon its creation in March 1905, in his honour.

An etching of a painting of Bolitho on his horse by Alfred Munnings, titled Thomas Robins Bolitho On Barum. Master of The Western Fox Hounds Since 1864, it has been in the collection of Penlee House. A study for the work, comprising three portrait sketches of Bolitho, also survives.

A "Robins Bolitho Challenge Shield" was presented to the GWR's Truro Ambulance Team in 1921, and, by "Mrs. Robins Bolitho", to their Penzance (No. 1) team in 1927.
