= Edward Hoblyn Warren Bolitho =

Cornish landowner and politician

Bolitho in 1931.

Sir Edward Hoblyn Warren Bolitho KBE CB DSO (20 April 1882 – 18 December 1969) was a Cornish landowner and politician. He was Chairman of Cornwall County Council from 1941 to 1952 and Lord Lieutenant of Cornwall from 1936 to 1962, for some years serving in both roles simultaneously.

== Life ==
The elder son of Captain Edward Alverne Bolitho, Royal Navy of Trewidden, and the grandson of Thomas Simon Bolitho of Trengwainton, Bolitho was educated at Harrow and the Royal Military Academy, Woolwich.

Bolitho was commissioned into the Royal Artillery in 1900 and served in the Great War of 1914 to 1918, in which he was twice mentioned in despatches and twice wounded. He was honoured with the Distinguished Service Order in 1919 and later that year retired from the regular army later, but continued to serve in the Territorial Army; he was President of the Cornwall TA Association 1936–62 and Honorary Colonel of the 56th (Cornwall) Heavy Anti-Aircraft Regiment, Royal Artillery from 1937.

After serving as High Sheriff of Cornwall for 1931–32, Bolitho was Chairman of Cornwall County Council from 1941 to 1952, as well as Chairman of the China Clay Council from 1951 to 1963. His distinguished career was recognised by appointments as a Knight Commander of the Order of the British Empire, a Companion of the Order of the Bath, and a Knight of the Order of St John.

Bolitho married firstly, in 1914, Agnes Hamilton, a daughter of G Randall Johnson, and they had one son and one daughter; soon after his first wife's death in 1950 he married secondly Sheila Désirée (died 23 November 2017), only daughter of Rt Hon Robert Bourne MP and Lady Hester Bourne. Sir Edward died on 18 December 1969.

His uncle, Thomas Robins Bolitho, (1840–1925), an English banker, who served as High Sheriff of Cornwall in 1890, bequeathed Trengwainton, a country house near Penzance, to him.

== Popular culture ==
Douglas Reeman, a historical novelist who, under the pseudonym Alexander Kent, wrote a series of naval novels set during the Age of Sail about a British officer called Richard Bolitho. Reeman has stated that the name Richard Bolitho was borrowed from Colonel Bolitho's brother, "a distinguished old chap" he had met in the Channel Islands when Reeman sailed his boat there.

== Honours ==
- KBE (1953)
- CB (1943)
- DSO (1919)
- KStJ (1952)

Sir Edward was also a JP and a County Alderman (CA) for Cornwall. Sir Edward Received the Freedom of the Town of Penzance on 25 April 1958.

Honorary titles
| Preceded by John Charles Williams | Lord Lieutenant of Cornwall; 1936–1962 | Succeeded by Sir John Carew Pole |
