= Madron =

Village in Cornwall, England

Coordinates: 50.133°N 5.565°W

Madron: Cornish: Eglosmadern
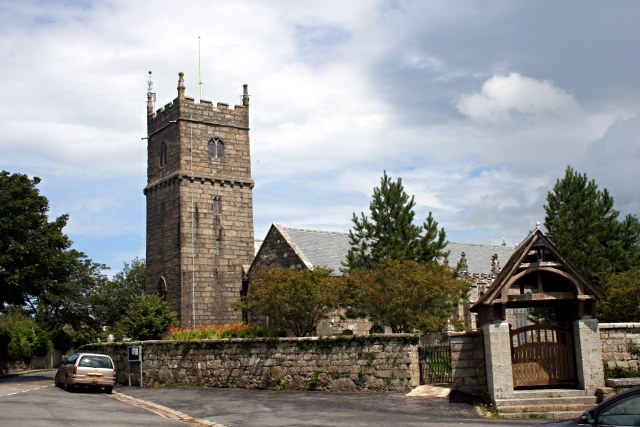
- Madron Parish Church
- Population: 1,632 (Parish, 2021)
- Civil parish: Madron
- Unitary authority: Cornwall
- Ceremonial county: Cornwall
- Region: South West
- Country: England
- Sovereign state: United Kingdom
- Post town: PENZANCE
- Postcode district: TR20
- Police: Devon and Cornwall
- Fire: Cornwall
- Ambulance: South Western

Madron (Cornish: Eglosmadern (village) or Pluw Vadern (parish)) is a civil parish and village in west Cornwall, England, United Kingdom. Madron is named after Saint Madern's Church. Its annual Trafalgar Service commemorating the death of Vice Admiral Horatio Nelson was started on 27 October 1946, following a local tradition that his death was first announced on British soil in the Union Hotel, Penzance.

== Geography ==
It is a large rural parish on the Penwith peninsula north of Penzance, bounded by the parishes of Sancreed and St Just to the west, by Zennor and Morvah to the north, by the sea and the parish of Paul in the south and by the parishes of Gulval and Penzance to the east. Madron village is centred on an elevated site approximately two miles (3 km) northwest of Penzance town centre. The main villages and hamets are Tredinnick, New Mill, Newbridge and Tregavarah. The population was 1,632 at the 2021 census. It had been 1,466 at the 2001 census, and 1,591 at the 2011 census. The parish church is in the churchtown and is dedicated to St Madron (or Madrona) (in local dialect "Maddern").

== History ==
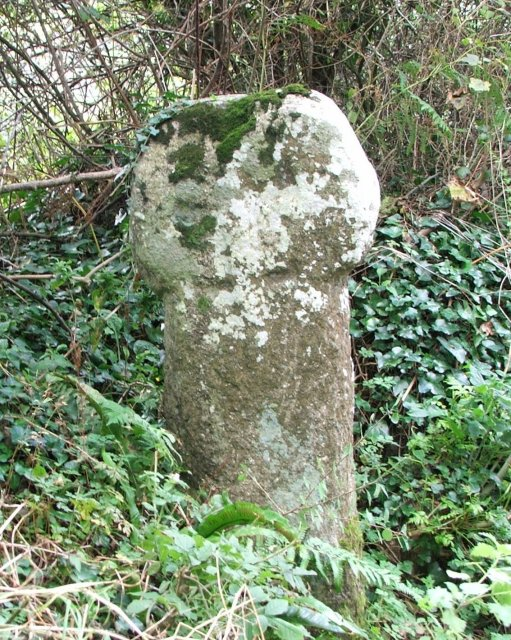
Trembath Cross

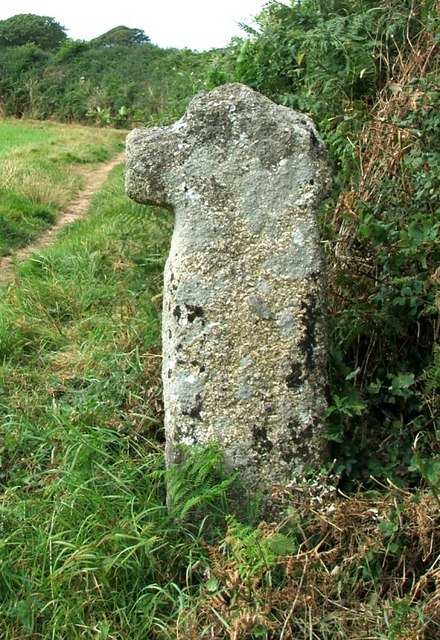
Boscathnoe Cross

Evidence of early medieval habitation at Madron is in the form of one or two inscribed stones. One was found in the wall of the village church and has since been removed; the inscription consists of a cross and legible text, but its meaning is not clear. The other inscription was reported by R. A. Stewart Macalister in 1949 as being 'built into the N. wall of the N. aisle, west of the entrance door' of the church, but has not been seen since; Elisabeth Okasha speculates that Macalister may have seen the inscription in another church, and misremembered its location. Arthur Langdon (1896) records eight stone crosses in the parish, of which one is in the churchyard and one is at Heamoor. The others are at Boscathnoe, Boswarthen, Parc-an-Growse, Trembath Cross, Trengwainton Carn, and Tremethick or Trereiffe.

Madron was recorded in the Domesday Book. It was within the Manor of Alverton, an area that in the Anglo-Saxon and medieval period formed much of what is now the southern part of west Penwith. The church itself was once under the control of the Knights Hospitallers of Jerusalem and was known by the Cornish name of Landithy, a name which is still used in parts of the village today. By 1885 the name Landithy referred to an estate of 144 acres (58 ha) which in that year was ″to be let for a term of 14 years″. It was said to have an excellent house, good buildings and good grassland.

Madron Well was, until the 18th century, the principal source of water for the nearby town of Penzance and Madron Church was the mother church of Penzance.

=== Admiral Lord Nelson ===
The news of the death of Vice Admiral Horatio Nelson following the Battle of Trafalgar in 1805 was received first in Britain by the arrival of HMS Pickle en route to Falmouth under the command of Lieut. John Richards Lapenotiere in Mount's Bay. It is believed a fishing vessel from Penzance passed the news to the shore which was formally announced from the balcony of the Assembly Rooms (now the Union Hotel) in Chapel Street, Penzance. Since the mother church of Penzance was at Madron, the mayor of Penzance took up a procession which made its way to Madron where a memorial service was held and the Nelson banner was paraded for the first time. On it was the epitaph "Mourn for the brave, the immortal Nelson's gone. / His last sea fight is fought, his work of Glory done". Storms in the English Channel meant that Nelson's body did not arrive by sea in London until January 1806. However, subsequent literature on the Union Hotel and Madron Church makes no mention of these events, and it is not recorded in the borough records or the Royal Cornwall Gazette, the only Cornish newspaper at that time. A tradition of an annual Trafalgar Service, held to commemorate the death of Nelson, was begun on 27 October 1946, when so many people attended that the service was relayed outside. These services continue to this day. The Trafalgar Fields housing development was so named to reinforce the links with Nelson.

=== Penzance Workhouse ===
The Penzance Union Workhouse once stood within the parish. The Penzance Poor Law Union was formed on 10 June 1837 and the population that fell within the Union at the time of the 1831 census was just under 40,000. The workhouse was built in 1838. Designed by George Gilbert Scott and William Bonython Moffatt, it was intended to house four hundred paupers and cost £6,050 to build. It was in use until 1948 when the National Health Service came into being.

== Cornish wrestling ==
Cornish wrestling tournaments, for prizes, were held in Madron in the 1800s, for example at New Mill.

== Madron today ==
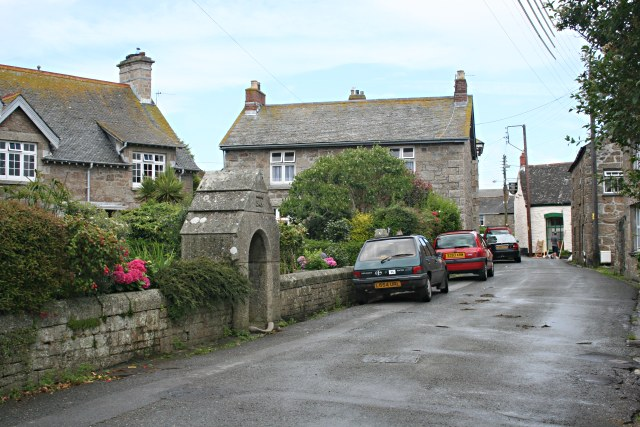
Church Road, Madron

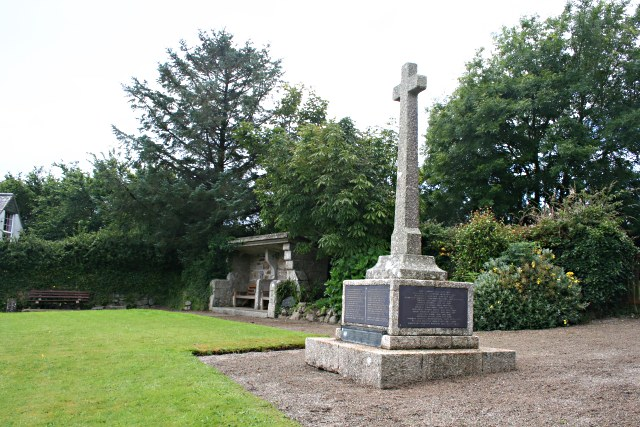
Madron memorial garden

Landithy Hall, which opened in 1909, contains the community rooms and tea rooms where guests can stay the night and hosts many village events. It is here that Madron Parish Council holds the majority of its meetings, the other venue being Trythall School, near New Mill, as well as at St. Maddern's Primary School, below the church in Madron.

Madron Feast Week is from the first Sunday in Advent. The Western Hunt traditionally meets at Madron on Feast Monday and also on Boxing Day.

The village has a Garden of Remembrance for the dead of both World Wars.

The local community radio station is Coast FM (formerly Penwith Radio), which broadcasts on 96.5 and 97.2 FM.

=== Schools ===
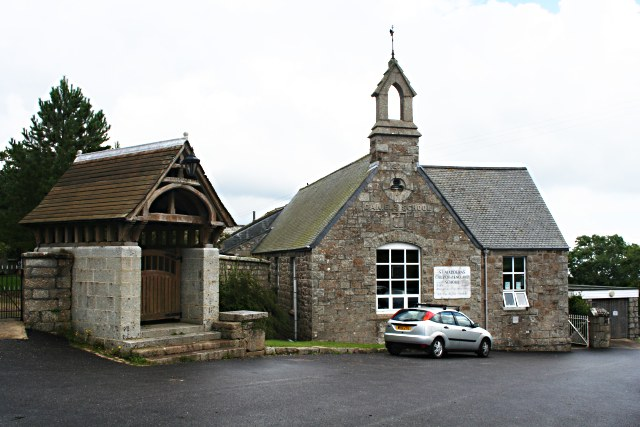
Madron Primary School

Madron Daniell's Endowed School was built by George Daniell in 1710 (his family were Lords of the Manor of Alverton for part of the 17th century. The school is next to the parish church with a view over Penzance and Mount's Bay and has a cottage for the headmaster on site. The school was extended from the original two classrooms to its current size in the late 1960s. It has subsequently been renamed St Maddern's Church of England School.

=== Playing field ===
The village has a King George V Playing Field which is home to Madron Football Club. Previously it has been home to Madron Cricket Club and the Penzance & Newlyn Rugby Club 2nd XV.

=== Buildings and gardens ===
Madron Well

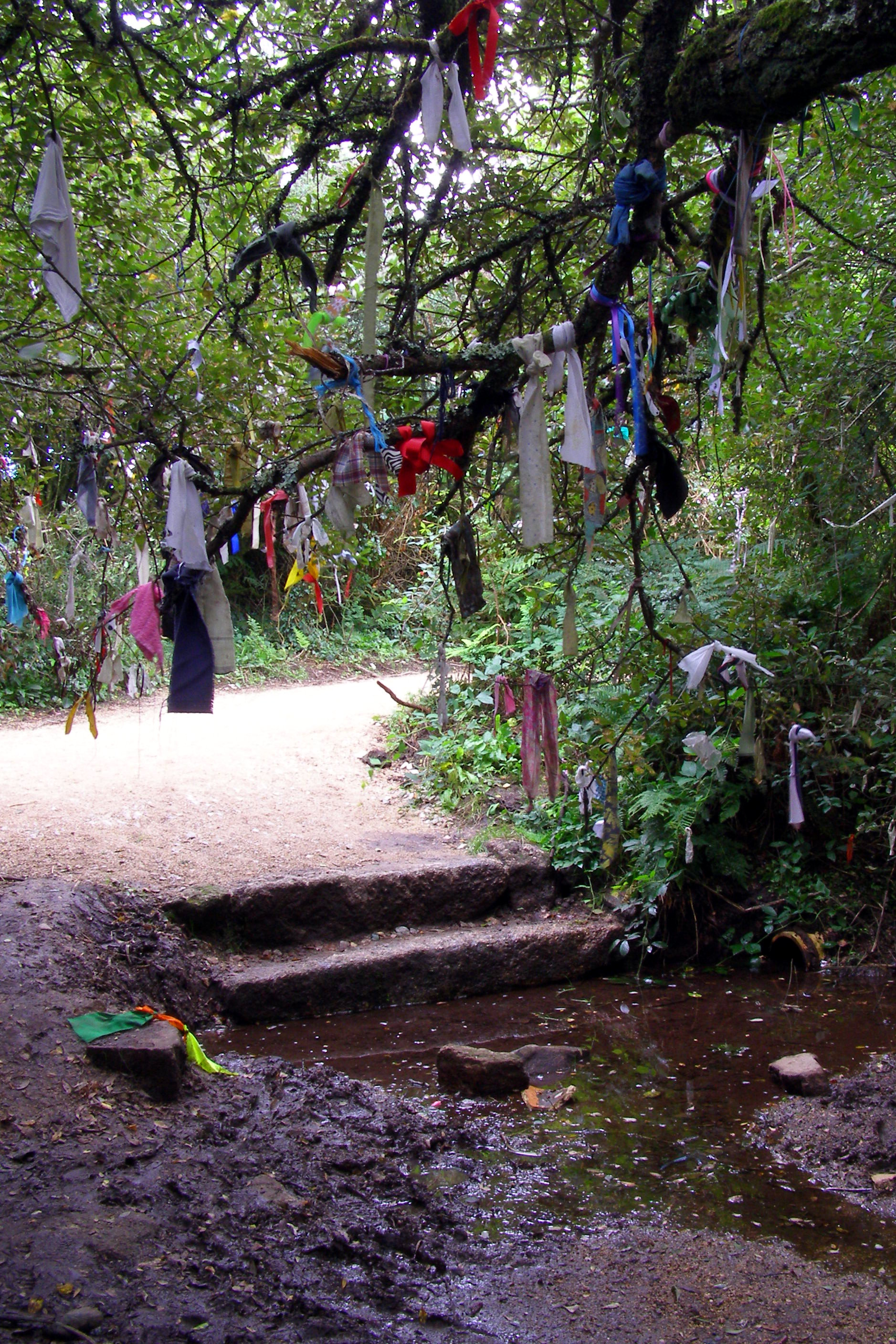
Clouties tied to a tree near Madron Well

The nearby Madron Well is an example of a Cornish Celtic sacred site, which is renowned for its healing properties. A May Day tradition, which was still being observed in 1879, was for many young folks (mainly girls) to head from Penzance before sunrise, to perform a ceremony, to learn the number of years they have to wait before they get married. Two grass stems or straw, each about an inch long were fastened together with a pin and dropped into the water. Any rising bubbles denote the number of years before they get married. The ceremony was no longer held on May Day, but on a Sunday, because the girls work during the week. A tradition at this site persists to this day whereby people attach pieces of rag (clouties) to the nearby bushes as a symbol of appeasement to the spirits within the well site (see also Clootie well). According to The Cornishman newspaper this tradition was no longer carried out in 1879.

Until the 18th century it was the only source of water for Madron and Penzance.

Madron Baptistry A short distance away is the ruined well-chapel (also known as Madron Baptistry), which has been dated to the 6th century, but is likely to have even earlier foundations. The building measures 7 metres by 5 metres and has no roof, and it is not known if it ever had a roof. Ivy and wild roses creep over the walls and ferns grow from between the granite blocks. It is a classical site for the nationally scarce, Cornish moneywort (Sibthorpia europaea).

Spring water, from the same source as the original well, is fed into a stone basin in the south-western corner. A low altar stone may be seen against the eastern wall, and stone seats line the walls.

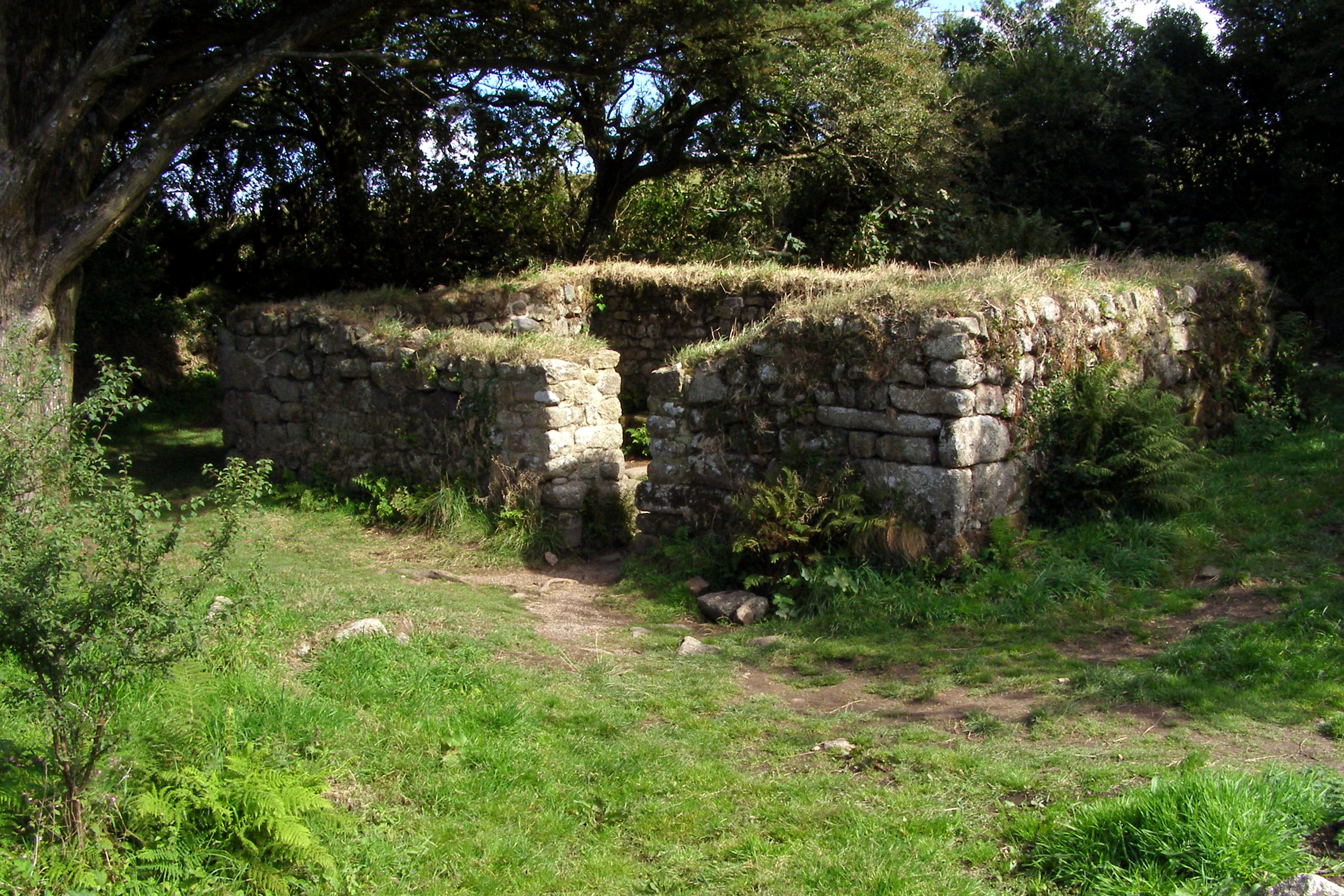
The baptistry near Madron Well

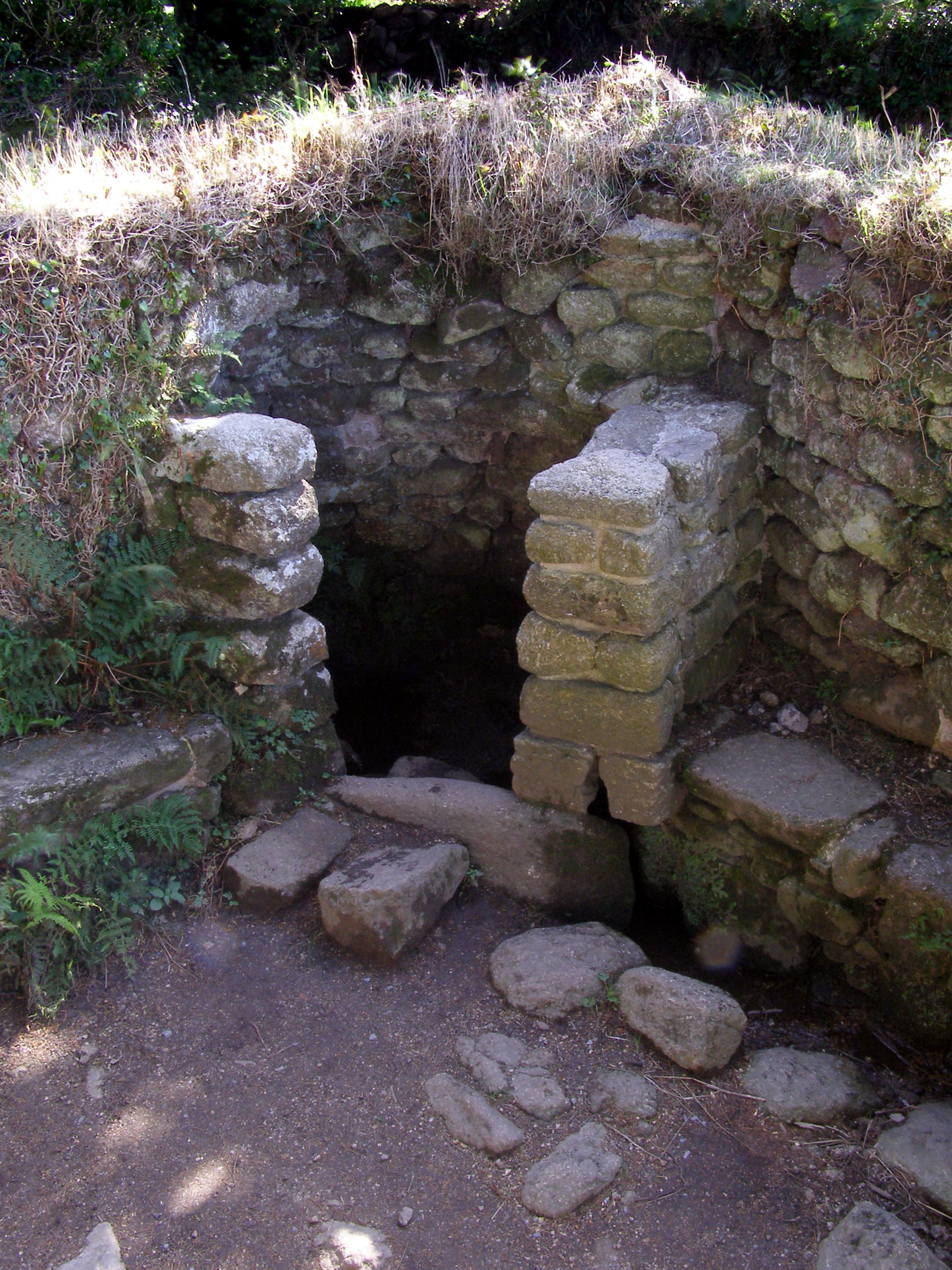
Basin in the south-west corner of the baptistry

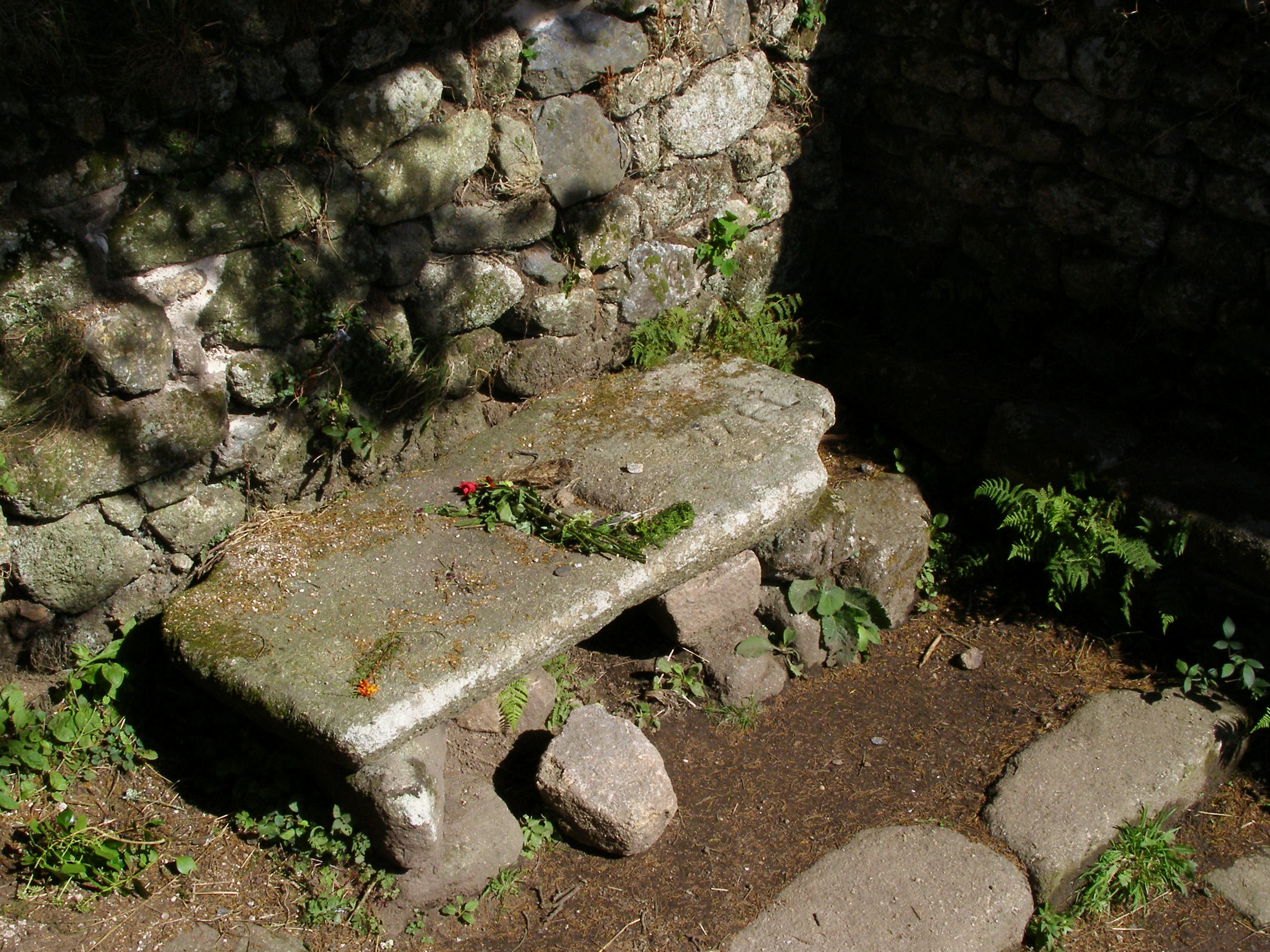
Altar at the eastern end of the baptistry

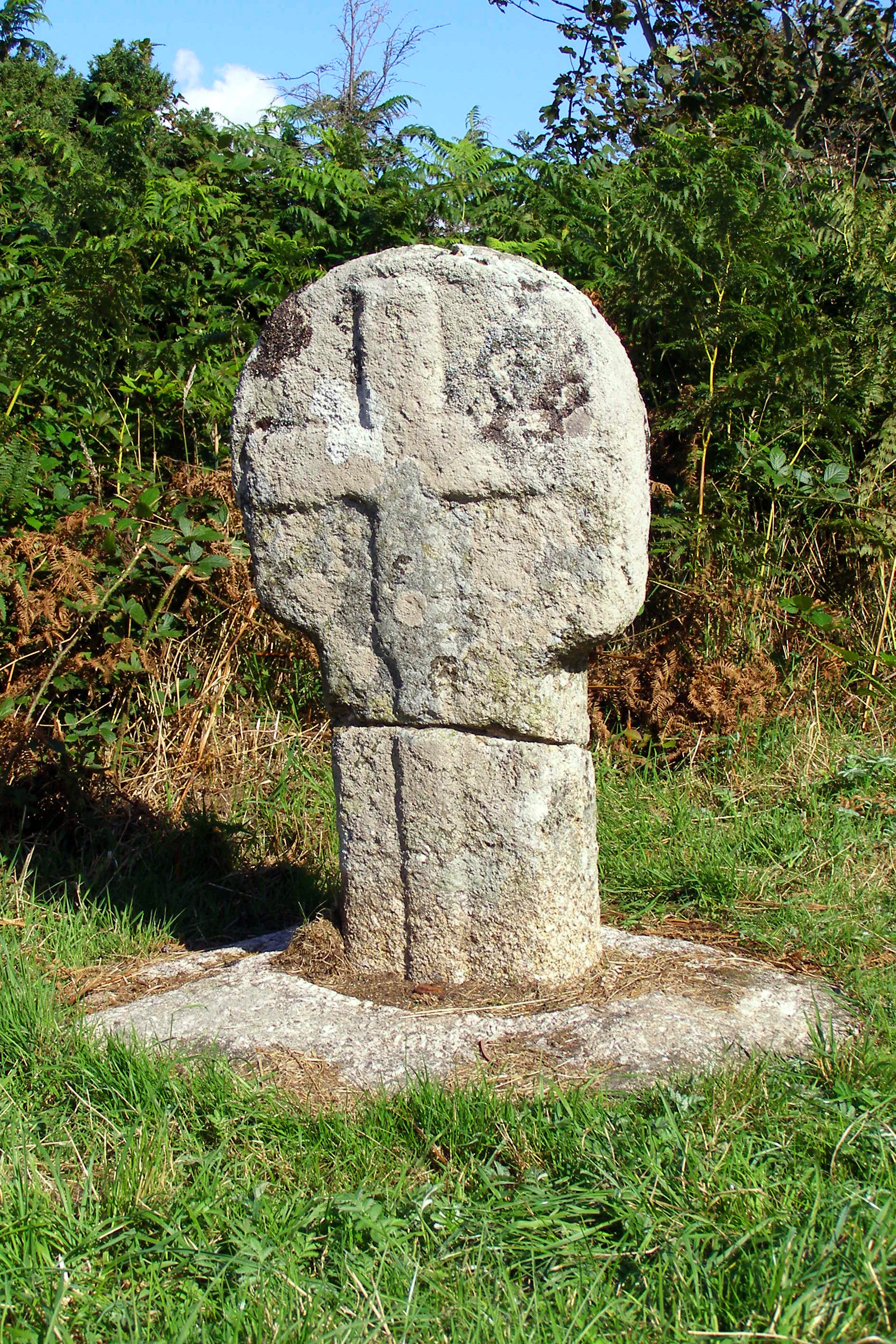
A wayside cross, Boswarthen (near Madron Well)

Trengwainton Garden'

Trengwainton Garden, a National Trust property has its closest village as Madron.

== Governance ==
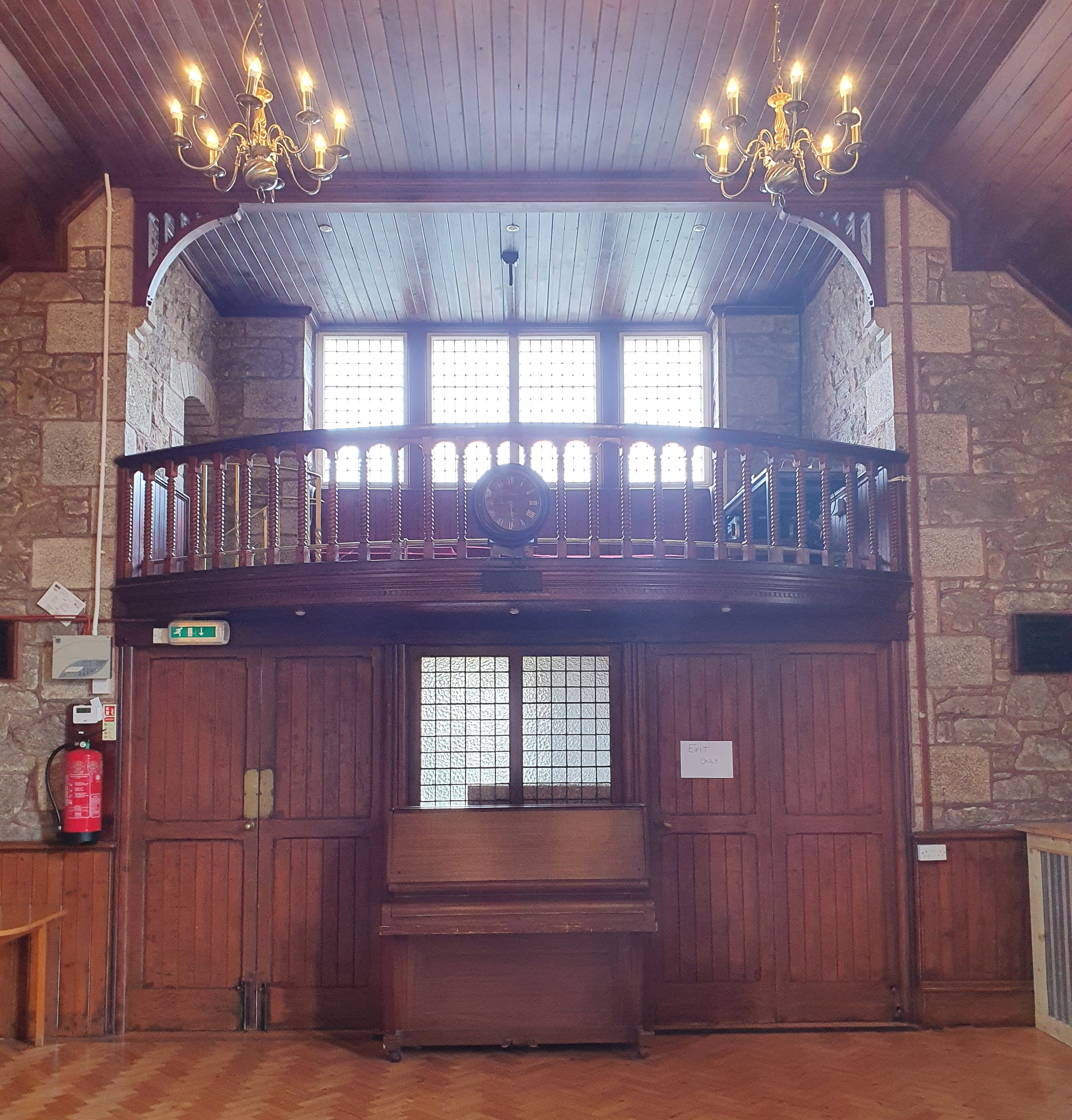
Interior of Landithy Hall, the village's public hall

There are two tiers of local government covering Madron, at parish and unitary authority level: Madron Parish Council and Cornwall Council. The parish council generally meets at Landithy Hall.

=== Administrative history ===
Madron was an ancient parish in the Penwith Hundred of Cornwall. The parish historically included Penzance, which gradually gained independence from Madron. In ecclesiastical terms, Penzance had a chapel of ease from at least the 14th century, had its own clergy from 1741, and became a separate ecclesiastical parish from Madron in 1871. In civil terms, Penzance became a borough in 1614 and subsequently administered parish functions under the poor laws separately from the rest of Madron parish. As such, Penzance became a separate civil parish from Madron in 1866, when the legal definition of 'parish' was changed to be the areas used for administering the poor laws.

In 1863, the part of Madron parish outside the borough of Penzance was made a local government district, administered by an elected local board. Such districts were reconstituted as urban districts under the Local Government Act 1894.

Madron Urban District was abolished in 1934, when it was downgraded to a rural parish within the West Penwith Rural District. Ahead of the 1934 reforms, Penzance Borough Council made representation to include the village of Madron within its boundaries but due to strong local resistance this move was defeated, although the Heamoor area was transferred from Madron into the borough of Penzance. The neighbouring parish of Gulval was abolished as part of the same reforms; Gulval village was absorbed into the borough of Penzance, but the more rural northern parts of Gulval parish were added to Madron parish.

West Penwith Rural District was abolished in 1974, and the area became part of the Penwith district. Penwith district was in turn abolished in 2009. Cornwall County Council then took on district-level functions, making it a unitary authority, and was renamed Cornwall Council.

== Notable residents ==
- William Bolitho (1862–1919), cricketer, banker and British Army officer
- William Sydney Graham (1918–1986), poet and husband of Nessie Dunsmuir, a plaque in Fore Street commemorates him
- John Robyns (1780–1857), Royal Marines officer, who served in the Napoleonic Wars and the War of 1812, and later the Mayor of Penzance
- Alfred Wallis (1855–1942) artist, died in Madron workhouse
- David Neil Liddiard Jenkin (born 1943), Cornish Wrestling and Judo Champion, Great Britain Wrestling (Sombo) and British Judo Council (England) representative. Coach to the British wrestling (Sombo) team at the World Games Den Haag, 1993. British Judo Association National vet's under 78 kilo champion 1990/91. European (IBF) Open and Middleweight Judo champion. World Sombo (U81k) silver medallist. Attended Madron School and Lescudjack County Secondary, Penzance. Represented the University of Heidelberg (Ruphrects Karl) at the German student judo championships, Aachen, 1971. Son of Leonard and 'Poppy' Jenkin.
