= William Bolitho (cricketer) =

English army officer and banker (1862–1919)

Personal information
- Full name: William Edward Thomas Bolitho
- Born: 2 July 1862; Madron, Cornwall, England
- Died: 21 February 1919 (aged 56); Bath, Somerset, England
- Batting: Right-handed
- Relatives: Ronald McNeill (brother-in-law)

Domestic team information
- Years: Team
- 1883–1885: Oxford University

Career statistics
Competition	First-class
Matches	11
Runs scored	338
Batting average	18.77
100s/50s	–/–
Top score	45*
Catches/stumpings	1/–
- Source: Cricinfo, 18 August 2019

William Edward Thomas Bolitho DSO JP (2 July 1862 – 21 February 1919), of Polwithen House, Penzance was an English first-class cricketer, banker and British Army officer.

== Life ==
The only son of William Bolitho and his wife, Mary Hichens Yonge of Polwithen House, he was born at Madron near Penzance in July 1862. He was educated at Harrow School, before going up to Trinity College, Oxford.

While studying at Oxford, he made his debut in first-class cricket for Oxford University against Lancashire at Oxford in 1883. He played first-class cricket for Oxford until 1885, making a total of eight appearances. In addition to playing for Oxford, he also appeared for the Gentlemen of England in 1885 against Oxford, during which he made his highest first-class score of 45 not out. For Oxford, he scored 242 runs at an average of 18.61 and a high score of 32. Bolitho later toured North America in September 1885 with a team formed by the Devon amateur E. J. Sanders, making two first-class appearances on the tour against the Gentlemen of Philadelphia at Germantown.

Graduating from Oxford in 1885, he enlisted in the Royal Devon Yeomanry in May 1889 as a second lieutenant. Between May 1889 and March 1895, he was promoted to the rank of lieutenant, before he was promoted to the rank of captain in March 1895. Bolitho served during the Second Boer War. He was made a temporary major during war, with the rank converted to an honorary rank in the third year of the war. During the course of the war he was wounded in action, mentioned in dispatches and awarded the Distinguished Service Order. Following the war, he resigned his commission in November 1904. Bolitho later served as the director of Barclays and was a justice of the peace for Cornwall. During the 1890s he played cricket for Cornwall prior to their participation in minor counties cricket. Bolitho died at Bath in February 1919.

== Family ==
He married Ethel Grace Macleod of Invergordon Castle at Inverness Cathedral on 21 June 1888; the wedding was postponed from Easter due to the death of the brides father. They had three children. His brother-in-law was the Irish cricketer Ronald McNeill, 1st Baron Cushendun.
