= Lanyon =

Lanyon is a surname which originates from the hamlet of Lanyon (Madron), Cornwall, and may refer to:

- Charles Lanyon (1813−1889), English architect
- George Lanyon Hacker (born 1928), English Suffragan Bishop of Penrith
- Ellen Lanyon (1926–2013), American painter and printmaker
- Hastie Lanyon, a fictional character in Strange Case of Dr Jekyll and Mr Hyde
- John Lanyon Whiting (1851–1922), Canadian lawyer and politician
- Karen Lanyon, Australian senior career officer of the Department of Foreign Affairs and Trade
- Mike Lanyon (born 1951), former Australian rules footballer
- Owen Lanyon (1842−1887), British colonial administrator
- Peter Lanyon (1918−1964), Cornish painter
- Ted Lanyon (1939–2008), Canadian retired professional ice hockey player
- Walter C. Lanyon (1887−1967), English religious writer
- Wesley E. Lanyon (1926–2017), American ornithologist and museum curator
- William Carlton Lanyon Dawe, generally known as Carlton Dawe (1865–1935), Australian author
- William James Lanyon Smith (1922–2018), New Zealand naval officer

== Places ==
In Antarctica

- Lanyon Peak, a sharp rock peak in Victoria Land
- Mount Lanyon, a large mountain in the Prince Charles Mountains

In Australia

- Lanyon High School, a school in Canberra
- Lanyon Homestead, an historic site in Canberra
- Lanyon Valley, a suburb of Canberra

In the United Kingdom

- Lanyon (Madron), a farm and hamlet in Cornwall
- Lanyon Place railway station, a railway station in Belfast
- Lanyon Quoit, a dolmen in Cornwall
- West Lanyon Quoit, a dolmen in Cornwall
- Lanyon Manor, a manor house in Gwinear Cornwall

In the United States of America

- Lanyon, Iowa, an unincorporated area

== Arts and entertainment ==
- The Spectre of Lanyon Moor, a Big Finish Productions audio drama

== Companies ==
- Lanyon, Lynn and Lanyon, a 19th-century firm of Civil Engineers and Architects in Ireland
- Lanyon Solutions, a software company
