= Chûn Quoit =

Dolmen in the Cornwall region, England

- Koyt Chi an Woon (Cornish)
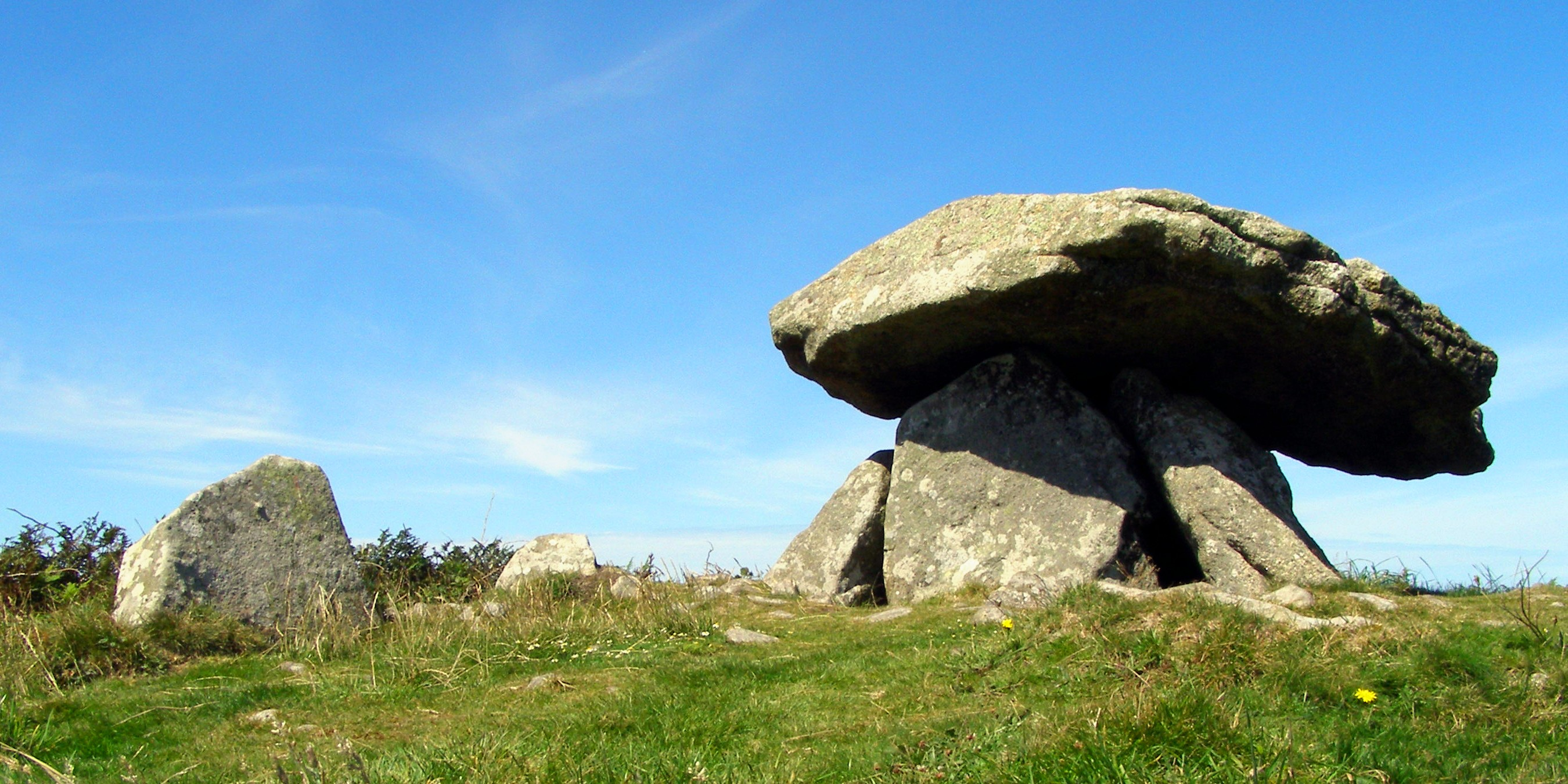
- The dolmen in 2007
- Interactive map of Chûn Quoit
- 50.1486°N 5.6377°W
- Type: Dolmen
- Location: England, United Kingdom

History
- Built: c. 2400 BC

Chûn Quoit (Cornish: Koyt Chi an Woon, meaning quoit of the house of the moor) is one of the best preserved of all Neolithic quoits (also called dolmens or cromlechs) in western Cornwall, England, United Kingdom.

Chûn Quoit is located in open moorland near Pendeen and Morvah. Standing on a ridge, near the much later constructed Chûn Castle hill fort, it overlooks heather moorland and the open sea.

== Description ==
Like the other quoits, the quoit was probably covered by a round barrow (35 ft in diameter), of which much evidence abounds. It was a closed chamber and its mushroom-domed capstone measures 3.3 m (11 ft) by 3 m (10 ft), with a maximum thickness of 0.8 m (2 ft 7 in). There is a cup mark on top of the capstone. It is supported about 2 m (7 ft) from the ground by four substantial slabs. There is evidence of an entrance passage to the south-east within the mound area. The site was examined in 1871 but no significant finds were made.

In the vicinity of Chûn Quoit there are many other megalithic and archaeological sites, such as Lanyon Quoit, Mulfra Quoit, Mên-an-Tol and Mên Scryfa. The rocky outline of Carn Kenidjack marks the position of midwinter sunset away to the south-west.

This is the only dolmen in West Penwith to retain its capstone 'in situ' – others have been re-settled. It is believed to have been built around 2400 BC, two millennia before the neighbouring Chûn Castle.

== Folklore ==
The Giants of Towednack records a local oral tradition that the Castle on Morvah Downs was the abode of the giant Old Denbras the Hurler who is killed in a wrassling match with a burly young man named Tom. He inherits Chûn Castle and the lands about on the condition that he buries the giant at his favourite seat on the hill facing out to sea;

"In the castle-court they found the club and sling with which Denbras slew the game he wanted: these Tom placed on the giant's knees, and Joan laid green oak-branches and flowers around him; then they worked with a will, and before sunrise they collected so much stones as raised the barrow gradually sloping, even with the tops of the flat uprights which enclosed the giant. Then, by the help of poles, or such contrivances as were only known to the old folks, they placed the quoit or capstone over the head of Denbras, which hid him for ever from the light of day; and, before the sun sunk below the hill-tops, they had raised as noble a barrow over the giant as any to be found on Towednack hills; yet they were not without adding, time after time, to the carp of the giant's resting-place.
