= Lanyon (Madron) =

Hamlet in Cornwall, England

Coordinates: 50.1505°N 5.6052°W

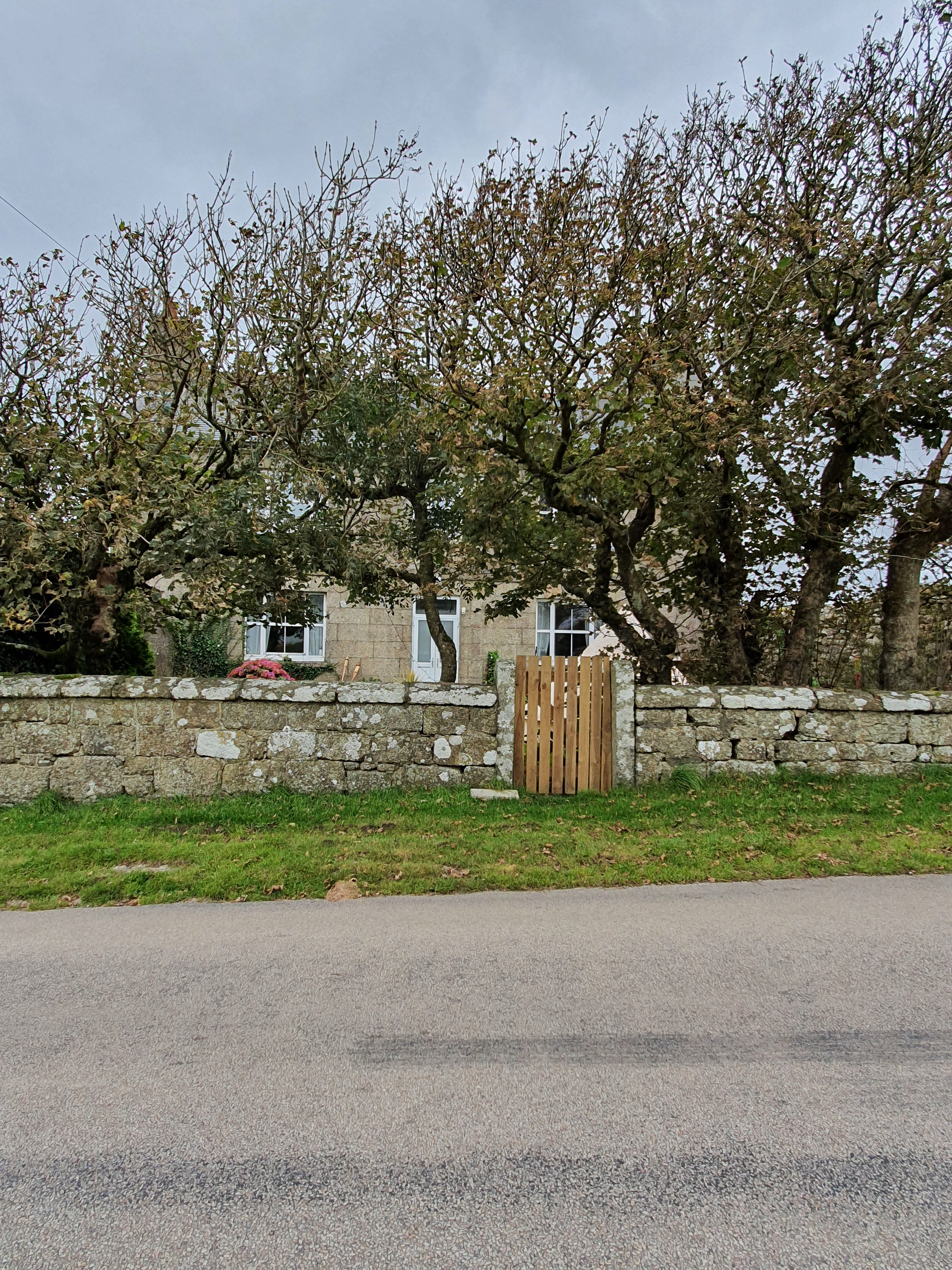

- Location within Cornwall
- OS grid reference: SW425340
- Unitary authority: Cornwall
- Ceremonial county: Cornwall
- Region: South West
- Country: England
- Sovereign state: United Kingdom
- Post town: PENZANCE
- Postcode district: TR20
- Dialling code: 01736
- Police: Devon and Cornwall
- Fire: Cornwall
- Ambulance: South Western
- UK Parliament: St Ives

Lanyon is a hamlet in the parish of Madron in Cornwall, England, UK. It is situated on a north facing slope on the Madron to Morvah road. The nearest town is Penzance 4 miles (6.4 km) to the south.

== Toponymy ==
Lanyon derives from Lyn yeyn in the Cornish language meaning cold pool. It has been previously written as Liniein, Leniein, Lenien (all three in 1214), Linyeine (1244), Lenyen (1285), Lynyeyn (1326), Lanyayn (1443) and Lennyen (1447). In 1878, Wayfarer in The Cornishman, and in 1880 William Bottrell states the name was pronounced as La-nine and Lanine respectively. The Lanyon surname originates from the hamlet and there are places in the parishes of Gwinear and Illogan where the name was taken by a branch of the family.

== History ==
There is evidence of Neolithic occupation of the area with the nearby megalithic tombs of Lanyon Quoit and West Lanyon Quoit, both within 0.5 miles (0.80 km). In the same field as West Lanyon Quoit is Old Lanyon, a deserted medieval farmstead dating from around 1050 AD and abandoned in the late 15th or early 16th century. Old Lanyon was a detached part of the Domesday manor of Binnerton in Crowan parish. From the 13th century through to the 18th century it was the home of the family which took its name from the sub-manor. The vicar of Madron was licensed by the Bishop of Exeter to take services in the Chapel of the Blessed Mary of Laneyn; the first instance of Lan in Lanyon. A field next to the present settlement is named Park-an-Chapel suggesting that by 1390 the main settlement was at, or near the present buildings.

In 1879 Lanyon Farm was owned by Jonathan Rashleigh. Rashleigh, was summoned to the West Penwith Petty Sessions at Penzance on 9 July 1879 for having four unfenced shafts belonging to an old abandoned mine on the farm. It was found that Mr Rashleigh was not to blame but was fined 5 s for each shaft and 20 s expenses.

== See also ==
- Lanyon Quoit
