= Bossence (surname) =

Cornish surname

- Cornwall, the area of origin of the surname
- Pronunciation: bah-sense, bo-sense

Origin
- Origin: Cornish
- Meaning: "Holy dwelling" or "Saint's dwelling" Bodsans → Bossans → Bossence
- Region of origin: England; Cornwall

Other names
- Variant forms: Bosence, Bossance, Boscence

Bossence is a surname of Cornish origin. It is an anglicized variant of the original Cornish "bos" (archaic "bod") meaning "dwelling" and "sans" meaning "holy" or "saint." It is also commonly spelled Bosence.

== Origins and variants ==
"Bossence" is a habitational name from the Penwith region of Cornwall near Land's End in South West England. As a surname, it is historically heavily concentrated in the towns and villages of Penzance, Hayle, St Erth, Sancreed, St Just, Morvah, Sennen, and St Buryan. There are also places called "Bosence" in the parishes of St Hilary and Sancreed. Today, Bossence and its variants are most commonly found in Canada, England, the United States, and Australia.

Until the gradual standardization of English spelling in the last few centuries, English lacked any comprehensive system of spelling. Cornish names, particularly as they were anglicized from the original Cornish, historically displayed wide variations in recorded spellings as scribes of the era spelled words according to how they sounded rather than any set of rules. This means that a person's name was often spelled several different ways over a lifetime. As such, different variations of the Bossence surname usually have the same origin.
