= The Night Manager (disambiguation) =

The Night Manager is a 1993 novel by John le Carré.

The Night Manager may also refer to:

- The Night Manager (British TV series), a BBC television adaptation of le Carré's novel that premiered in 2016
- The Night Manager (Indian TV series), a television adaptation of the novel that premiered in 2023
