= Higher Downs =

Coordinates: 50.146°N 5.639°W

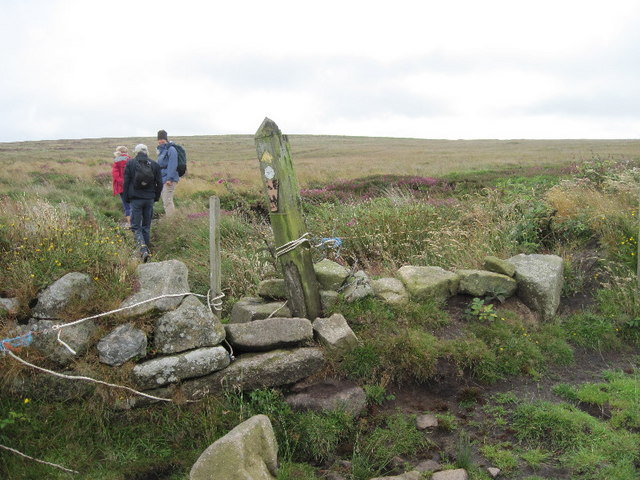
Access point for the Higher Downs

Higher Downs is a moorland in the parish of Morvah in west Cornwall, England.
