= John Whiting (disambiguation) =

John Whiting was an English actor, dramatist and critic.

John Whiting may also refer to:

- John Whiting (MP) (died after 1430), MP for Shaftesbury
- John Whiting (anthropologist)
- Jack Whiting (cricketer), John Whiting, cricketer
- John Whiting, namesake of Whiting, Vermont
- John Lanyon Whiting (1851–1922), lawyer and politician in Ontario, Canada
- John Whiting (1931 – 2024), musician, sound designer and producer

== See also ==
- John Whiting Award
