= Mên Scryfa =

Inscribed standing stone in Cornwall, England

- Men Skrifys (Cornish)
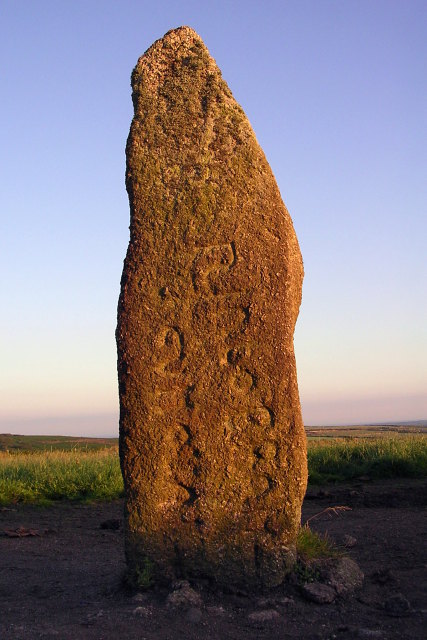
- Mên Scryfa illuminated by the setting sun.

- Location within Southwest Cornwall
- 50.162238°N 5.603314°W
- Type: Standing stone
- Periods: Early Middle Ages
- Location: Cornwall

Mên Scryfa (Cornish: Men Skrifys, meaning inscribed stone) is an inscribed standing stone in Cornwall, England, United Kingdom (grid reference SW427353). The inscription, dating to the early medieval period, commemorates "Rialobranus son of Cunovalus."

== Location ==
Mên Scryfa stands near the Madron to Morvah road in Cornwall. It stands in the middle of a field. The prehistoric Mên-an-Tol standing stones lie about 300 metres to the south.

== Description ==
The stone is 1.7 metres high and roughly rectangular in section, with sides of 0.4 metres by 0.5 metres. The inscription is on the northern face, although the bottom of the inscription is buried in the ground. At one time two plain crosses were said to be viewable at the upper end of the stone. The horizontal axis of the lower cross, is clearly visible but the vertical stroke is very indistinct. The smaller cross above this can no longer be distinguished.

== The inscription ==
The inscription, in debased Roman capitals, reads "Rialobrani Cunovali fili", which translates as "Rialobranus son of Cunovalus." Rialobran is not known elsewhere, but he may have been a Cornish petty king or tribal leader. Rialobran (or Ryalvran) may be Cornish for "royal raven", whereas Cunovallos may be British for "famous leader" (being cognate to the second element in the surname McConnell), thus the inscription would read "royal raven son of famous leader". Alternatively, Cunovalus may be Cornish for "worthy hound". Antiquarians, at one time, used to identify Cunovalus with the pre-Roman British king Cunobeline.

== Dating ==
The inscription has been dated on stylistic grounds to the 5th to 8th century AD. It is thought, however, that the stone itself could be a prehistoric standing stone.

== History ==
The antiquarian William Borlase described the stone in 1769: at that time it was lying prostrate on the ground. It was erected in 1825 only to be toppled again in 1849 by treasure hunters. It was lying face down when John Thomas Blight described it in 1861. It was however re-erected in its current position around 1862, the last word of the inscription being buried.

On Thursday 1 June 2023, the stone was vandalised by unknown individuals. The top of the stone was covered in petrol and lit on fire. Additionally, a 4" hole had been dug around the base of the stone. CASPN and police were alerted.

== In folklore ==
A popular tradition stated that a battle was fought nearby, and that Riolbranus was slain and buried at the spot. It was further claimed that the length of the stone (about 9 feet) was the exact height of the warrior.

== Possible identification ==
The genealogist Peter Bartrum records two men with a connection to the area who bear the name "Cynwal", the Brittonic rendering of "Cunovalus": both occur within the same genealogy; one being Cynwal Garnwch, son of Amlawdd Wledig; the other being Amlawdd's father, Cynwal son of Ffrwdwr. As such, Rialobrani (modernised as Rialfran or Rialbran) could either be a cousin to King Arthur as son of Cynwal Garnwch, or his great uncle as son of Cynwal son of Ffrwdwr.
