= The Night Manager =

1993 spy novel by John le Carré

- First edition
- Author: John le Carré
- Language: English
- Genre: Spy fiction
- Publisher: Hodder & Stoughton
- Publication date: 1993
- Publication place: United Kingdom
- Media type: Print (hardback & paperback)
- Pages: 443
- ISBN: 0-679-42513-6
- OCLC: 28528951
- Dewey Decimal: 823.914 L456
- LC Class: PR6062.E33 L43 1993

The Night Manager is an espionage novel by British writer John le Carré, published in 1993. It was his first post-Cold War novel, detailing an undercover operation to bring down a major international arms dealer.

== Plot summary ==
Jonathan Pine, a former British soldier trained at the Duke of York's Royal Military School, is a night manager at the Hotel Meister Palace in Zurich. Richard Onslow Roper, a billionaire trafficker in arms and drugs, arrives with his entourage during a snowstorm. Pine bears a grudge against Roper from an incident which occurred years prior, in Cairo, where Pine was working as the night manager at the luxurious Queen Nefertiti hotel. The owner of the Queen Nefertiti, Freddie Hamid, had ties to Roper. Hamid's mistress, Sophie, was a French-Arab woman who provided Pine with incriminating documents about Roper, asking him to forward them to the Egyptian authorities. Pine did so but disregarded her warning that Roper had ties to British intelligence. He forwarded copies to a friend with MI6, and a short time later, Sophie was murdered.

In Switzerland, Pine is approached by ex-MI6 Chief Leonard Burr and senior civil servant Rex Goodhew, who are planning an elaborate sting operation against Roper. Eager to avenge Sophie, Pine agrees to go undercover to infiltrate Roper's criminal empire. The operation is jeopardised by an inter-agency turf war within the intelligence community and possible collusion with Roper. Burr's operation, a joint effort between his group and sympathetic American colleagues, is code-named Limpet. Pine fabricates a criminal identity and cover story, then wins Roper's confidence by rescuing Roper's son from a phony kidnapping orchestrated by Burr. Roper recruits him into his organisation, in preparation for a large illegal arms deal with a Colombian drug cartel.

Unknown to Pine, the cartel's lawyer Dr. Paul Apostoll is an American Limpet informant. He explains to Burr that Roper has convinced the cartel to professionalise its armed forces to better protect itself against possible military intervention. Roper has agreed to supply the cartel with military-grade weaponry and training in exchange for a large shipment of cocaine. Apostoll convinces Roper that his usual front man, Major Corkoran, is unreliable, forcing Roper to use Pine instead. Corkoran is convinced that Pine is a plant, but cannot find any proof. During his work for Roper, Pine gathers intelligence about his activities. He also falls in love with Roper's innocent English mistress, Jed.

Corrupt factions within both the CIA and British intelligence are profiting from the illegal arms trade and mount a counter-operation, Flagship. They subtly threaten Goodhew, who backs off the case, and betray Apostoll's status as an informant to the cartels. Under torture, Apostoll reveals Pine's true identity to Roper, and is murdered. Pine is captured and tortured on Roper's yacht.

To save Pine, Burr contacts one of Roper's men, Sir Anthony Bradshaw, a corrupt English aristocrat, and bluffs that he has enough information to convict Roper and all of his associates. He tells Bradshaw that if Pine and Jed are released unharmed, he will likewise allow Roper to get away. Convinced by Burr's lies, Roper releases the two. Pine and Jed retreat to Pine's isolated cottage at the Lanyon, a few miles from Land's End.

== Reception ==
Kirkus Reviews praised Le Carré's "mastery in the details". A review in The Washington Post criticised the "story-book ending... The good guys don't win, but they don't lose either."

== Continuity ==
The Night Manager features the re-appearance of Harry Palfrey, the Legal Adviser to the British Secret Intelligence Service, who first appeared in The Russia House. Sir Anthony Bradshaw previously appeared in the epilogue of The Secret Pilgrim, in which Leonard Burr also appears as the youthful Chief of the Service.

== Adaptation ==
On 10 January 2015, production of an adaptation was announced. Directed by Susanne Bier, the six-part serial aired on BBC One in the UK and began airing on AMC in the US in April 2016. The cast includes Tom Hiddleston as Pine, Hugh Laurie as Roper, Olivia Colman as a gender-swapped Burr, Tom Hollander as Corkoran, and Elizabeth Debicki as Jed. A second season, featuring Pine, Roper and Burr in a new story, broadcast in 2026.

An Indian streaming series adaption starring Anil Kapoor and Aditya Roy Kapur was released in 2023 on Hotstar.
