= St Bridget's Church, Morvah =

Church in Cornwall, England

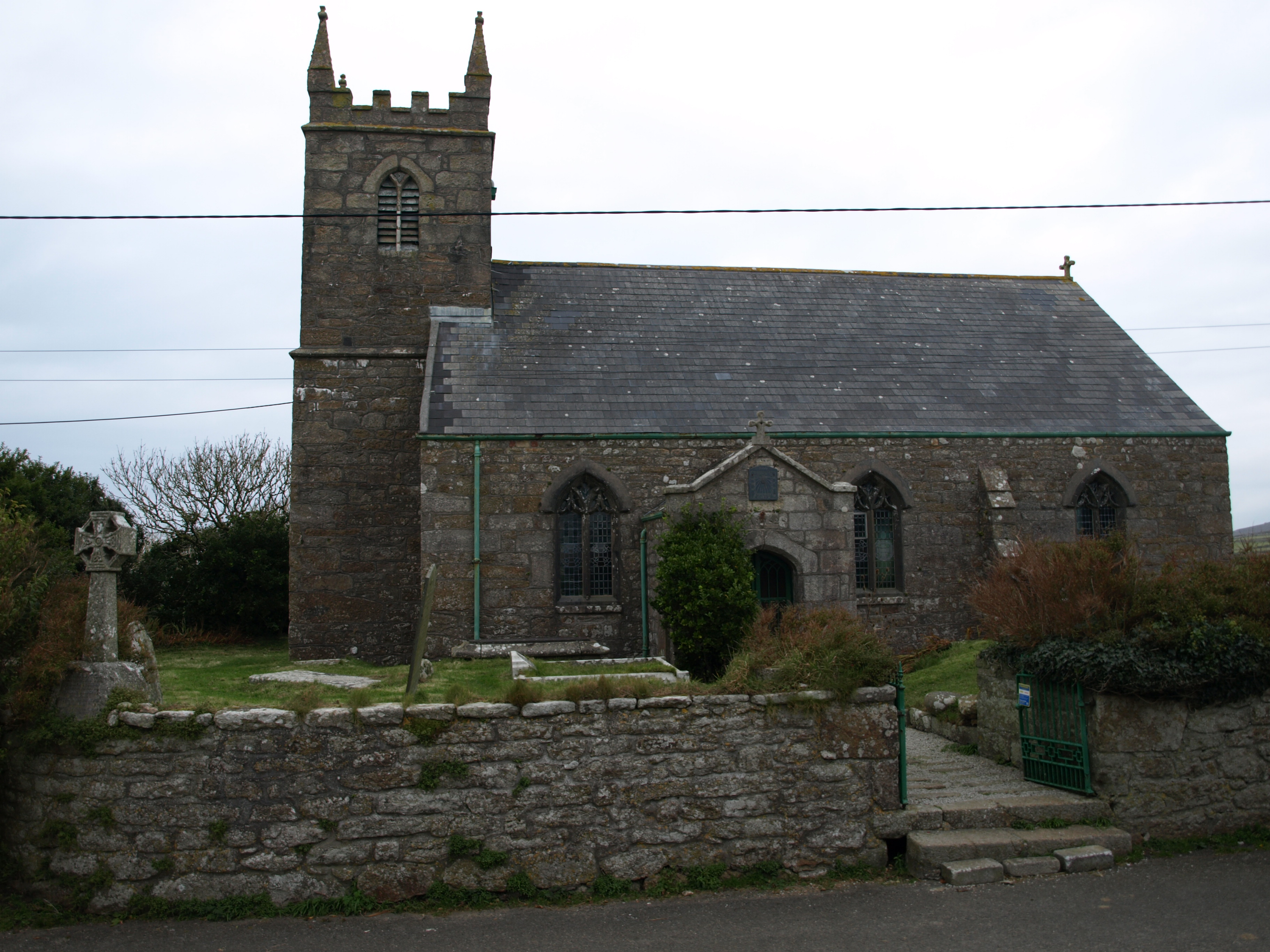
- St Bridget's Church, Morvah
- St Bridget's Church, Morvah
- 50°09′44″N 05°38′18″W
- OS grid reference: SW402355
- Denomination: Church of England
- Churchmanship: Broad Church

History
- Dedication: Bridget of Sweden

Administration
- Province: Canterbury
- Diocese: Truro
- Archdeaconry: Cornwall
- Deanery: Penwith
- Parish: Morvah

St Bridget's Church, Morvah is a parish church in the Church of England Diocese of Truro located in Morvah, Cornwall, UK. It was licensed for divine service by the Bishop of Exeter on 22 September 1400. The tower is the only remaining medieval part of the church. The nave and chancel were rebuilt in 1828. The church was added to the National Heritage List for England in 1954 at grade II, the lowest of three grades for listed buildings.

== St Bridget ==
The medieval church, is believed to be dedicated to the Swedish St Bridget, who was canonised in 1391. Research by the Penwith History Group has found that the earliest reference to Bridget ″of Sweden″ is an April 1928 article in The Cornishman newspaper by Canon Jennings, the vicar of Madron with Morvah and repeated by Walter Frere, the Bishop of Truro on the centenary of the rebuilding of the church in August 1928. A chapel of St Bridget, probably at Morvah, was mentioned in 1390, a year before St Bridget of Sweden (died 1371) was canonised. There is a pattern of churches along the coast being dedicated to Irish saints and it is likely that the St Bridget at Morvah refers to an Irish saint. One such saint is Brigid of Kildare who died in 525 and named after a pagan Irish goddess who seemed to be an important figure in the Celtic church. Further evidence for an Irish connection was the feast of Lughnasa (now Lammas), an Irish pagan festival held on the first Sunday in August until the mid 1800s. The then vicar described it as an event attended ″by disorderly persons of every description″.

The dedication is sometimes given as St Morwetha. Morvah was in early times a chapelry dependent on Madron.

The name Morvah means "marsh"; in the 14th century St Morwetha, perhaps a fictional saint, is mentioned. An alternative meaning could be sea from the Cornish mor.

The tower contains three bells, one from 1799 and two from 1828.
