= Mulfra =

Coordinates: 50.1575°N 5.5656°W

Mulfra: Cornish: Molvra
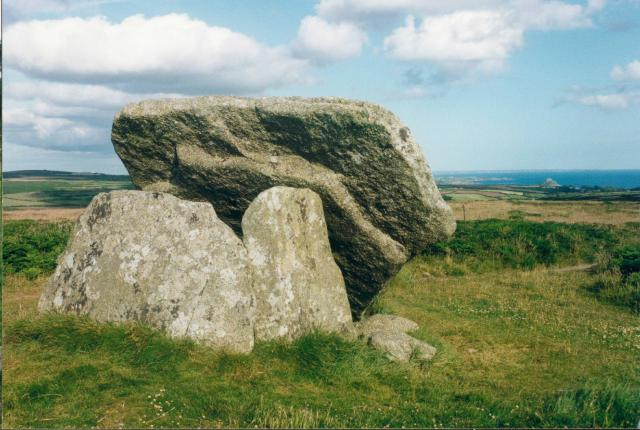
- Looking south from Mulfra hill

- Location within Cornwall
- Unitary authority: Cornwall
- Ceremonial county: Cornwall
- Region: South West
- Country: England
- Sovereign state: United Kingdom
- Dialling code: 01736
- Police: Devon and Cornwall
- Fire: Cornwall
- Ambulance: South Western
- UK Parliament: St Ives

Mulfra (Cornish: Molvra) is a hamlet in the parish of Madron, Cornwall, England and is on the southern slope of Mulfra Hill. Nearby is the Scheduled monument, Mulfra Quoit, which is a portal dolmen, i.e. a ceremonial and funerary monument dating from the early or middle Neolithic period, probably in use from 3500 to 2600 BC.
