= Rosemergy =

Coordinates: 50.170°N 5.617°W

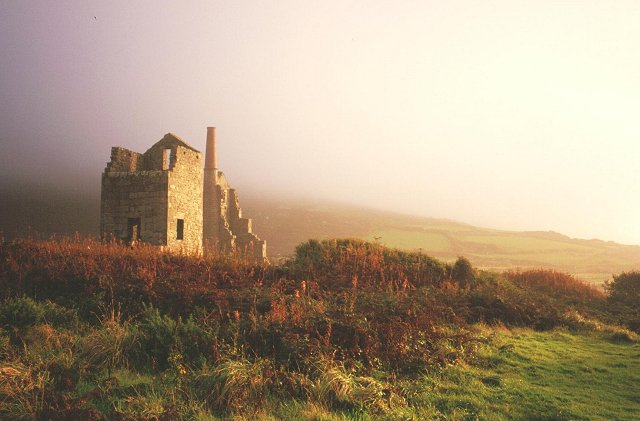
Rosemergy Mine

Rosemergy is a hamlet near Morvah in Cornwall, England, United Kingdom on the B3306 road between St Ives and St Just.
