= Penwith =

Area in west Cornwall, England

Coordinates: 50.16°N 5.53°W

Penwith Pennwydh (Cornish)
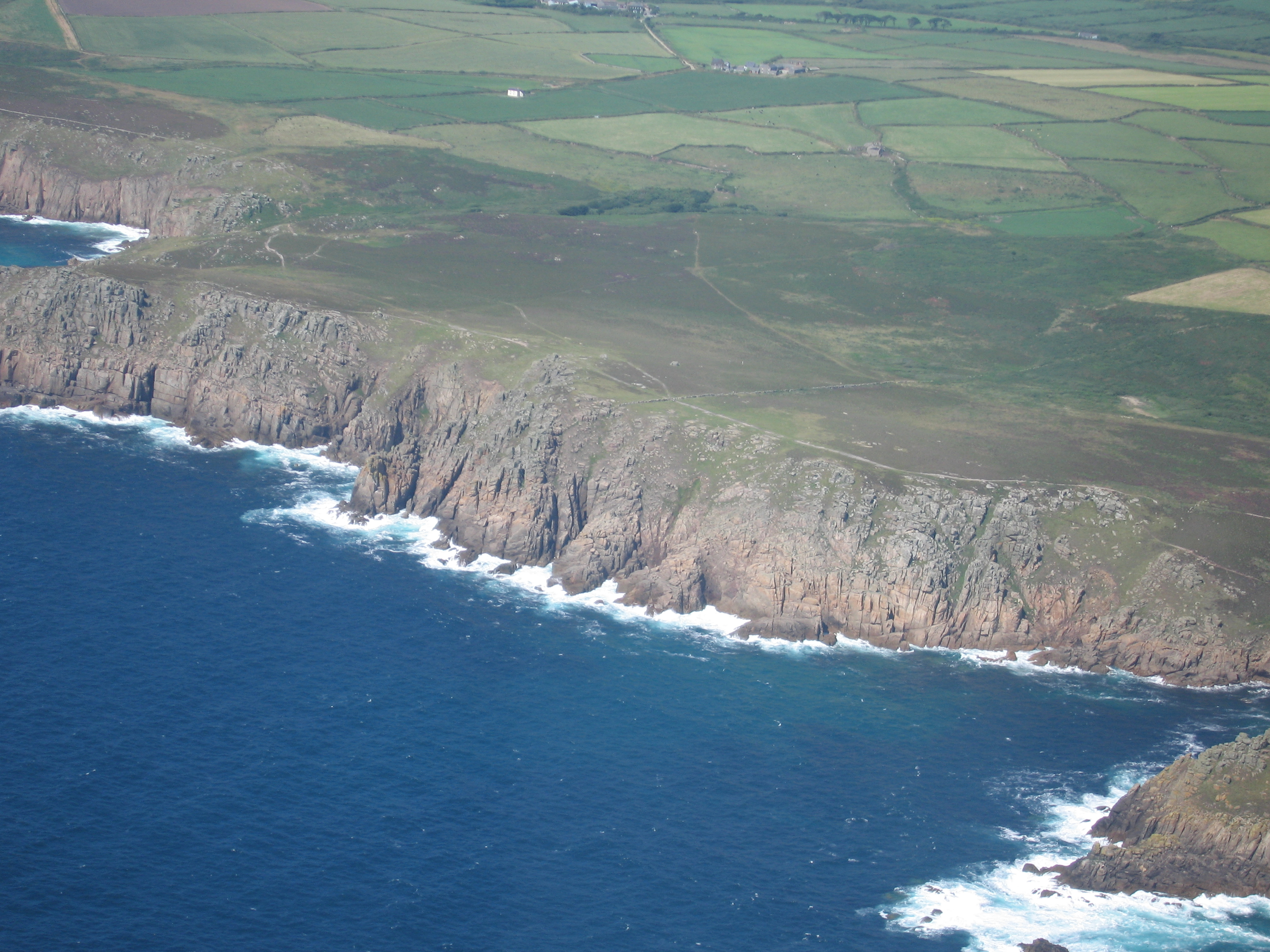

- Shown within Cornwall
- Population
  - 1973: 51,690
  - 2001: 62,994
- History
  - Preceded by: Borough of Penzance; Borough of St Ives; St Just Urban District; West Penwith Rural District
  - Created: 1 April 1974
  - Abolished: 1 April 2009
  - Succeeded by: Cornwall unitary authority
- Status: Former district
- ONS code: 15UF
- Government: District council
  - HQ: Penzance
  - Motto: Kensa ha Dewetha
- Subdivisions
  - Type: Civil parishes

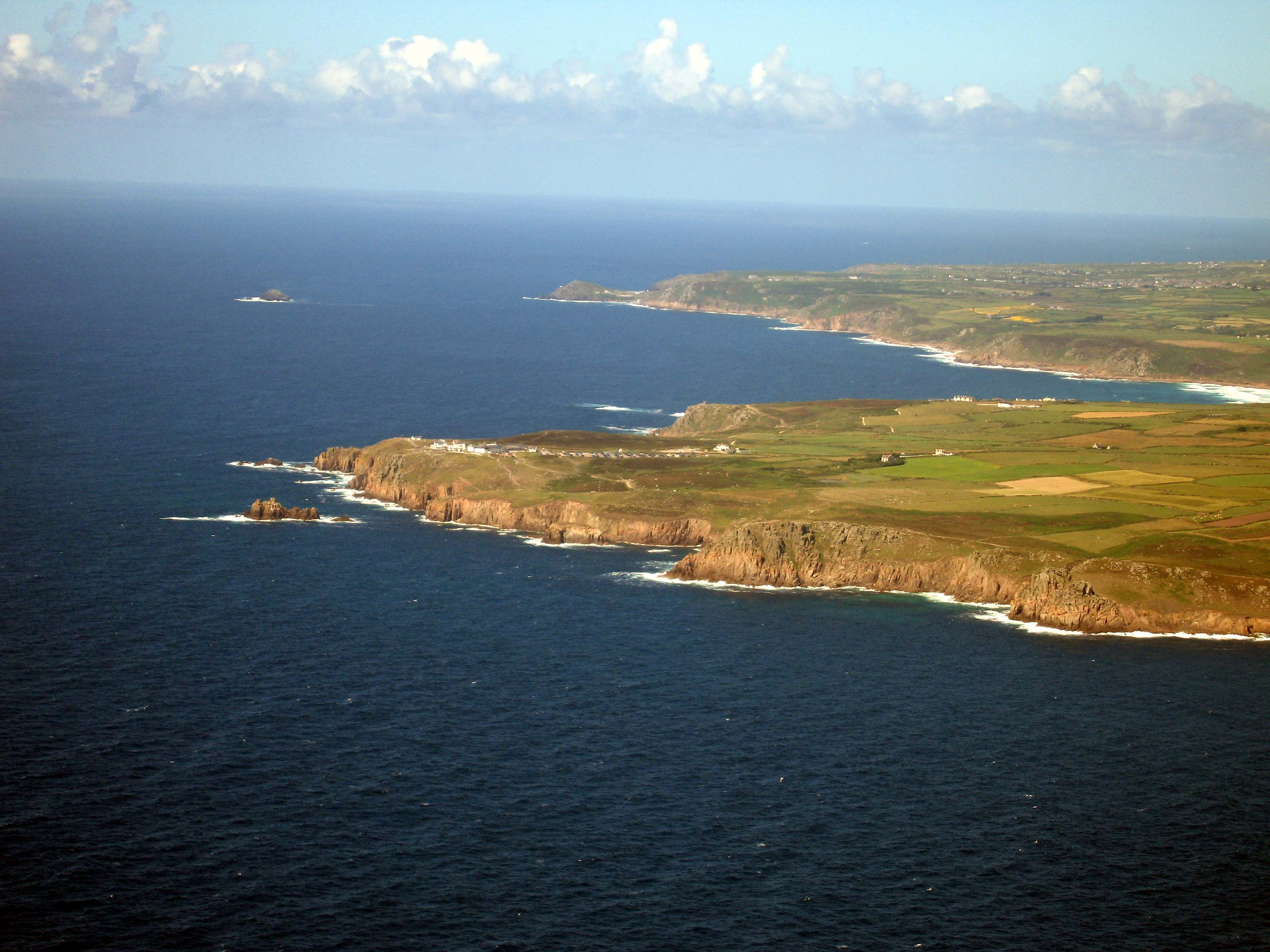
Aerial photo looking across Land's End to Cape Cornwall

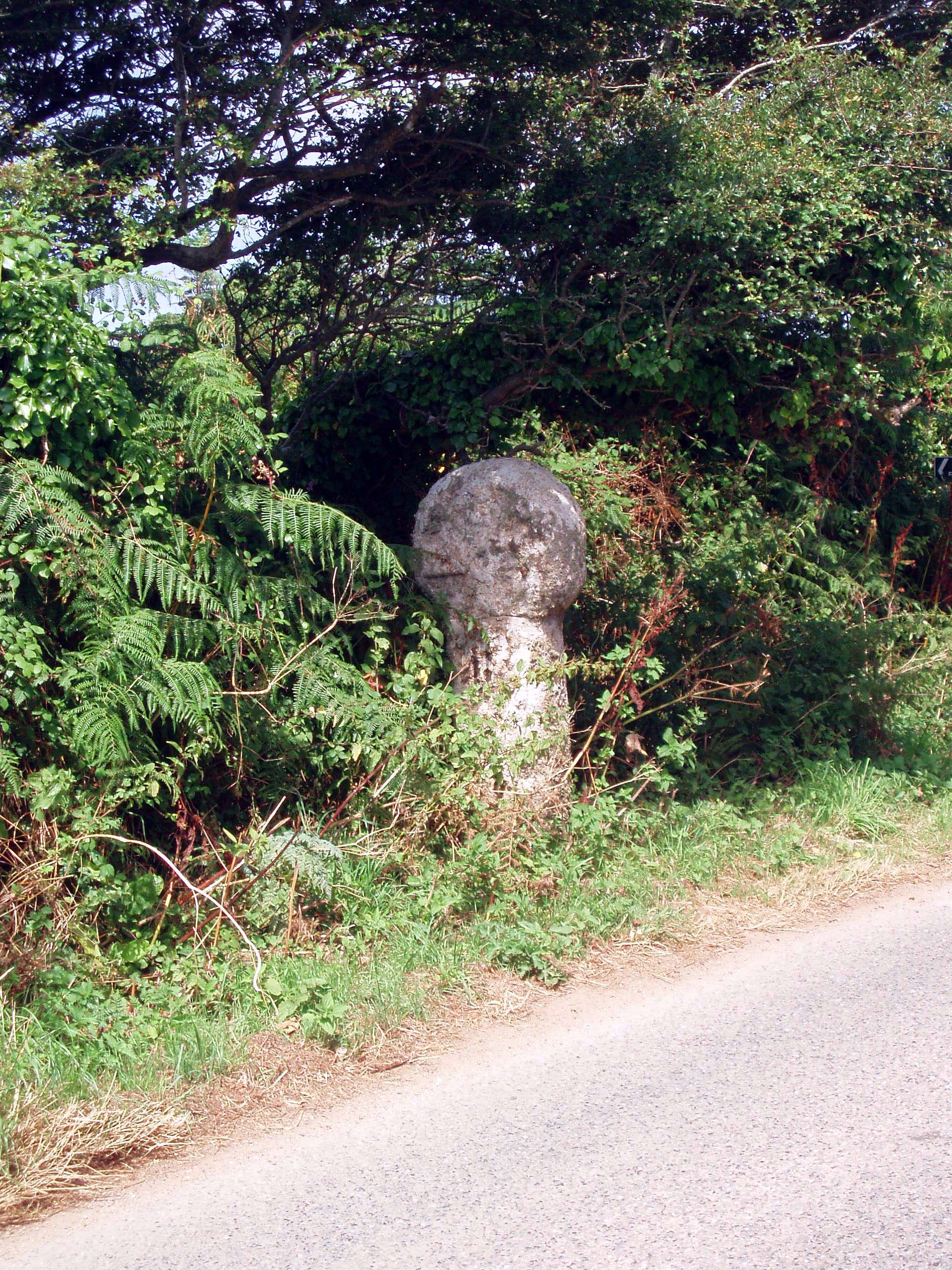
Celtic cross near St Loy's Cove, St Buryan

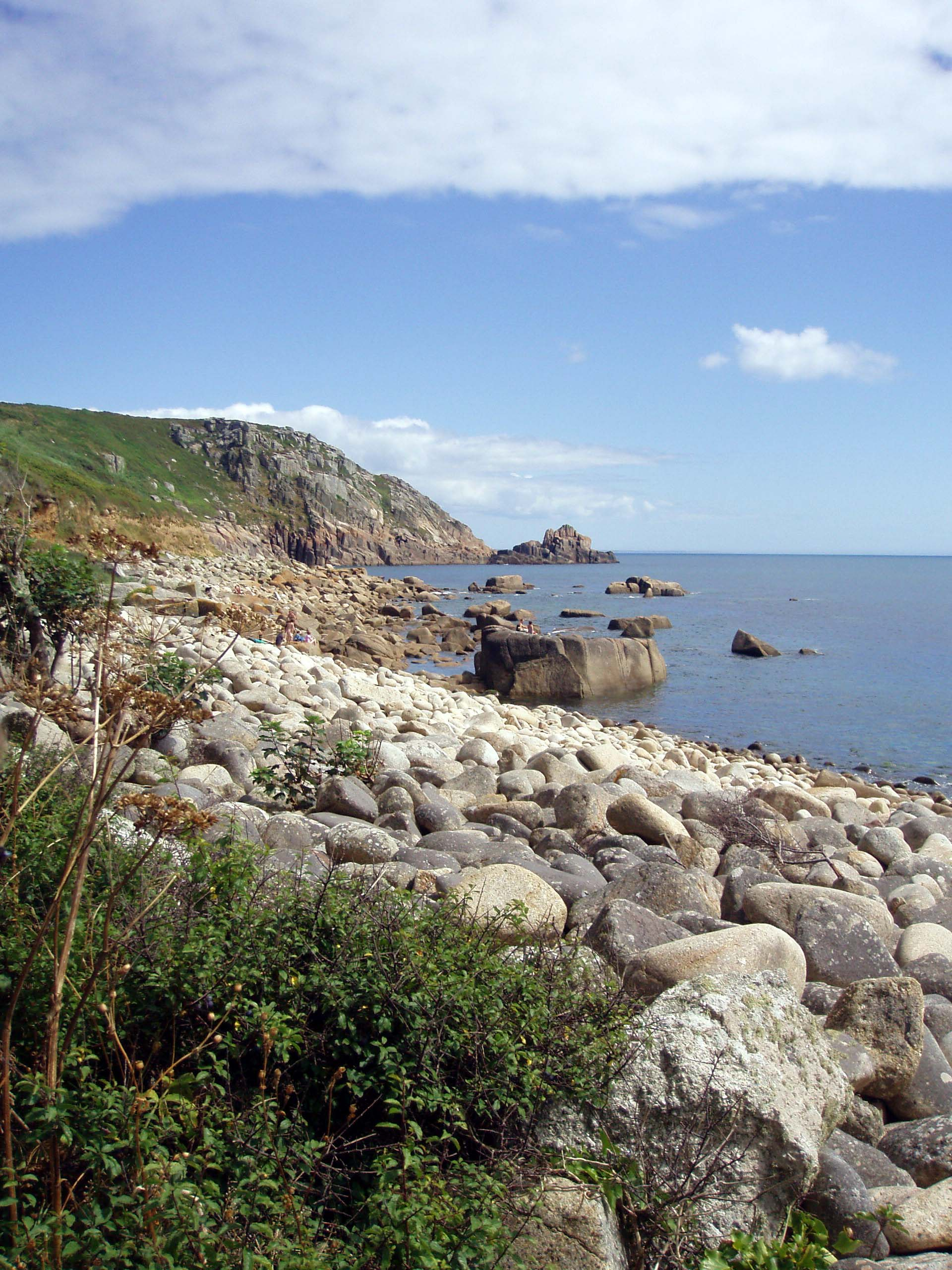
Rocky cove at St Loy in the south of the district

Penwith (/ˌpɛnˈwɪθ/; Cornish: Pennwydh) is an area of Cornwall, England, located on the peninsula of the same name. It is also the name of a former local government district, whose council was based in Penzance. The area is named after one of the ancient administrative hundreds of Cornwall which derives from two Cornish words, penn meaning 'headland' and wydh meaning 'at the end'.

Natural England has designated the peninsula as National Character Area 156 and named it West Penwith. It is also known as the Land's End Peninsula.

== Geography ==
The Penwith peninsula sits predominantly on granite bedrock that has led to the formation of a rugged coastline with many fine beaches. The contact between the granite and the adjoining sedimentary rock (mostly shales) is most clearly seen forming the cliffs at Land's End, the most westerly point in the district and this geology has resulted in the mining that has made Cornwall famous. Tin and copper have been mined in the area since pre-Roman times and the landscape is dotted with ruined mine buildings. Inland, the peninsula is primarily granite with a thin top soil. This combined with Cornwall's exposed position and the prevailing weather systems from the Atlantic Ocean means that, with the exception of the high moor areas, much of the area is a semi-bare plateau standing around 130 m above sea level. This is most evident on the north coast between St Just and Zennor where the remains of the ancient seabed of the Pliocene era are visible. Its highest point is Watch Croft (252 m).

There are several deep valleys cut into this plateau such as Lamorna on the south coast, where sufficient shelter from the weather is gained for trees to establish and grow. The shelter of these valleys and the mild climate gives Penwith a flora not seen anywhere else in the UK. Penzance's Morrab Gardens is able to grow bananas. Penwith also contains an artificial lake, Drift Reservoir, which is located approximately 3 miles west of Penzance. In addition to Penwith's status as a Heritage coastline, west Penwith, an area of 90 square kilometres, is considered an Environmentally Sensitive Area. Penwith lies within the Cornwall Area of Outstanding Natural Beauty (AONB).

The principal towns in Penwith are Penzance, the port town and seat of local government, and St Ives, one of the county's most popular seaside resorts. The district is largely rural, and contains many villages, principal amongst them being Botallack, Carbis Bay, Crowlas, Drift, Gulval, Gwithian, Hayle, Lamorna, Lelant, Long Rock, Ludgvan, Madron, Marazion, Morvah, Mousehole, Nancledra, Newlyn, Paul, Penberth, Pendeen, Porthcurno, Sancreed, Sennen, St Buryan, St Erth, St Hilary, St Just in Penwith, Treen and Zennor.

As a small peninsula at the tip of a larger peninsula, the district is somewhat isolated from the rest of the UK. Two major transport routes terminate in the district, the A30 road and the Great Western Main Line railway. The St Ives Bay Line provides local transport between St Ives, and the main line at St Erth. A ferry to the Isles of Scilly, 28 miles (45 km) west-south-west of the district, is based in Penzance.

=== Parishes ===
The district contained the parishes of:

- Gwinear–Gwithian
- Hayle
- Ludgvan
- Madron, Marazion, Morvah
- Paul, Penzance, Perranuthnoe
- Sancreed, Sennen, St Buryan, St Erth, St Hilary, St Ives, St Just, St Levan, St Michael's Mount
- Towednack
- Zennor

== History ==
Penwith contains a great concentration of Bronze Age, Iron Age, and Celtic British archaeological remains. The most significant of them are described in a field guide first published in 1954. Tewdwr Mawr (Cornish: Teudar or Teudaric) ruled over the area from Carnsew in the mid-6th century before returning to his patrimony in Cornouaille in Brittany around 577.

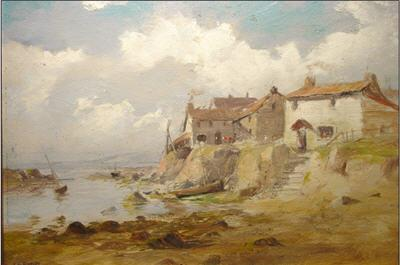
Fishing Cottages, Lamorna Valley, Penwith Peninsula, by John Noble Barlow

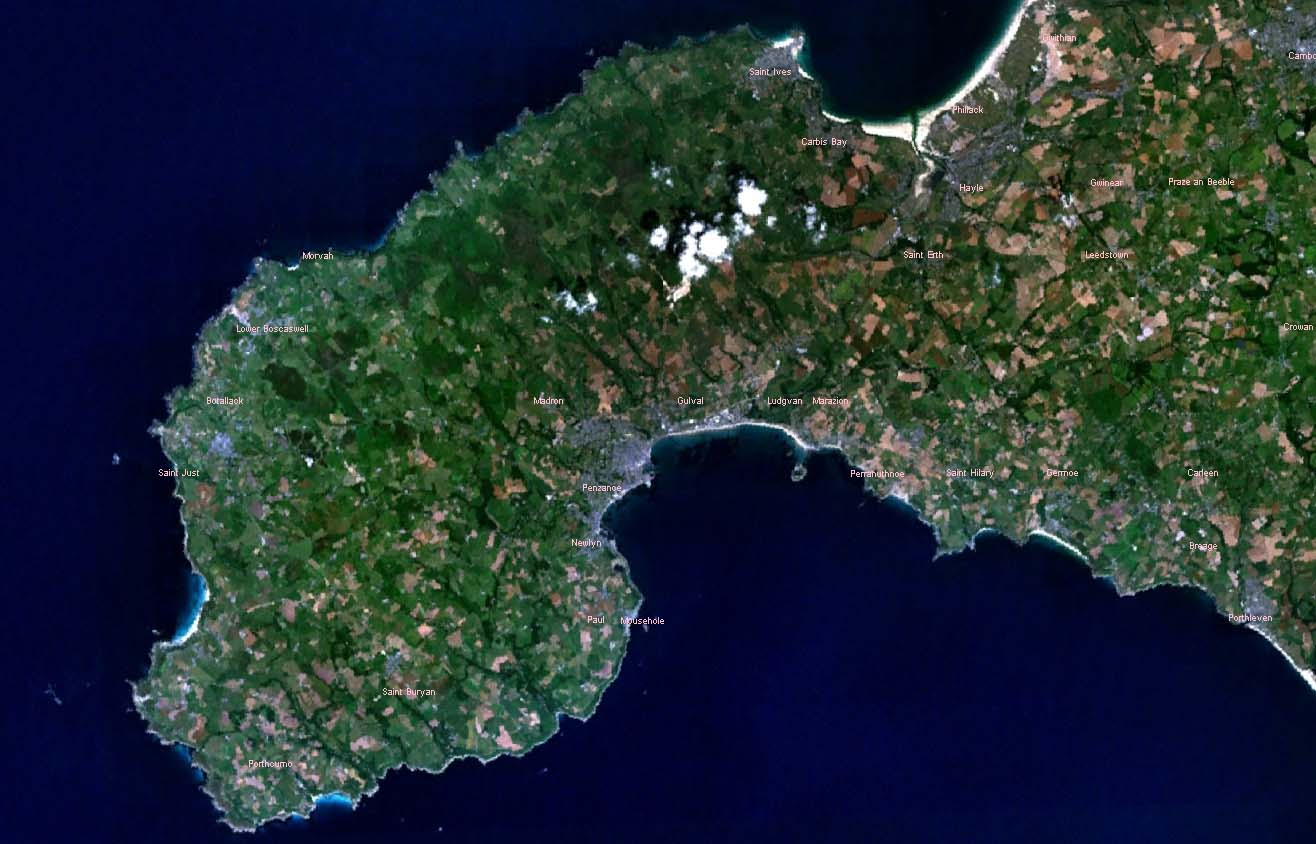
Satellite image of the Penwith peninsula

Penwith's population has remained broadly static for the last one hundred and fifty years.

Penwith is believed to be the last part of Cornwall where Cornish was spoken as a community language. Dolly Pentreath, known as the last recorded speaker (but arguably not the very last) came from Paul in Penwith. A year following the death of Dolly Pentreath in 1777 Daines Barrington received a letter, written in Cornish and accompanied by an English translation, from a fisherman in Mousehole named William Bodinar stating that he knew of five people who could speak Cornish in that village alone. Barrington also speaks of a John Nancarrow from Marazion who was a native speaker and survived into the 1790s.

Chesten Marchant, d. 1676, a woman from Gwithian, is believed to have been the last monoglot Cornish speaker.

Canon Doble's Cornish Saints Series included saints from this area: nine of these were reissued in 1960.

== Demographics ==
Penwith had a population of 65,000 in the mid-2007 estimates. 96.4% of Penwith residents were born in the UK.

72% of people in the district gave Christianity as their religion, whilst nearly 18% of people stated that they are non-religious, compared to 15 per cent nationally.

Penwith has the 6th highest rate of divorce of any district in England and Wales at 13.4% of the over 16 population, and correspondingly also has one of the lowest percentages of married couple households.

Penwith district has one of the lowest levels of home ownership in the country (280th/376) and is ranked 4th for those without central heating. The district also has one of the lowest rates of second car ownership and is ranked 300 out of 376 districts in England and Wales.

The district has some of the highest indicators of bad health in the country and is ranked 28th and 41st for those described as having long term illness and general poor health respectively.

Penwith has one of the highest unemployment rates of any district, ranked 51st out of 376 districts, and also one of the lowest rates of degree level education at 16%, compared to the national average of 20% (244th/376). Penwith is also ranked as the district having the 28th largest retired population in England and Wales.

== Economy ==
Penwith is an area of extreme economic deprivation. It is ranked as the 25th most deprived district in England, and it is located in Cornwall, the poorest county in England. It has been suggested that in fact this ranking understates the extent of the problem due to the difficulties of assessing deprivation in dispersed rural populations, and the socially and economically polarised nature of rural communities.

Deprivation manifests itself in the form of high youth unemployment, an above average proportion of workers in manual occupations, low mean income and a low percentage of people with higher degrees. High educational attainment up to GCSE and A-level demonstrates the depth of local talent, however, poor job opportunities and the absence, until recently, of a university in Cornwall has meant that much of this young talent leaves the area and never returns. As such Penwith was listed as an Objective 1 area by the European Social Fund, however, this status expired in 2006 with the programme closing on 31 December 2008. Traditionally, like much of the rest of Cornwall, Penwith's economy relied heavily on mining and fishing and was badly affected by the decline of these industries. Although the district has tried to stimulate employment through tourism, many of these jobs are by definition seasonal or part-time and do not replace the skilled jobs lost by the closure of the mines.

=== Mining ===
Tin mining once played an important part in the economy of Penwith, with mines across the district including Levant, Botallack, Cape Cornwall, Ding Dong and Wheal Hope. Tin mines gradually became economically mined out through the nineteenth and twentieth centuries, as the easier seams were exhausted and more amenable sources of metal were discovered in South America. The collapse of the world tin cartel in 1985 finished what remained of the industry.

The last working mine in the district and one of the last in Cornwall was at Geevor which is now a heritage site and museum following grants totalling nearly £4 million from various sources including the Heritage Lottery Fund. The north of the district has arguably suffered the worst from the closure of the mines as there have been few jobs available to replace what was lost to mining. This is most notably the towns of St. Just and Pendeen which have very high levels of unemployment. Many miners from the district have emigrated over the last century in order to find mining jobs abroad.

=== Fishing ===
Despite the decline in the number of people employed in the fishing industry, it still plays an important part in the district's economy. Newlyn harbour is the largest deep sea fishing port in England in terms of the value of fish landed (turnover >£18 million 2004) and contributes 2% of the region's GDP. The Newlyn fleet utilises a variety of catching methods, however, the vessels are comparatively small and mostly owned by their skippers in comparison with the large factory boats of Spain and France with whom they share their fishing grounds. Accusations of illegal overfishing by the French and Spanish fleets is a source of local friction. Until the 1960s, pilchards were the major catch landed at Newlyn, which were processed at the nearby pilchard works, before the fish fell out of favour with the public. A revival of pilchard fishing in Penwith in recent years occurred after a rebranding exercise as Cornish sardines (sardines are actually small pilchards). This has been helped by investment from the Objective One programme. Much of the catch is sold abroad in Spain and Italy.

=== Farming ===
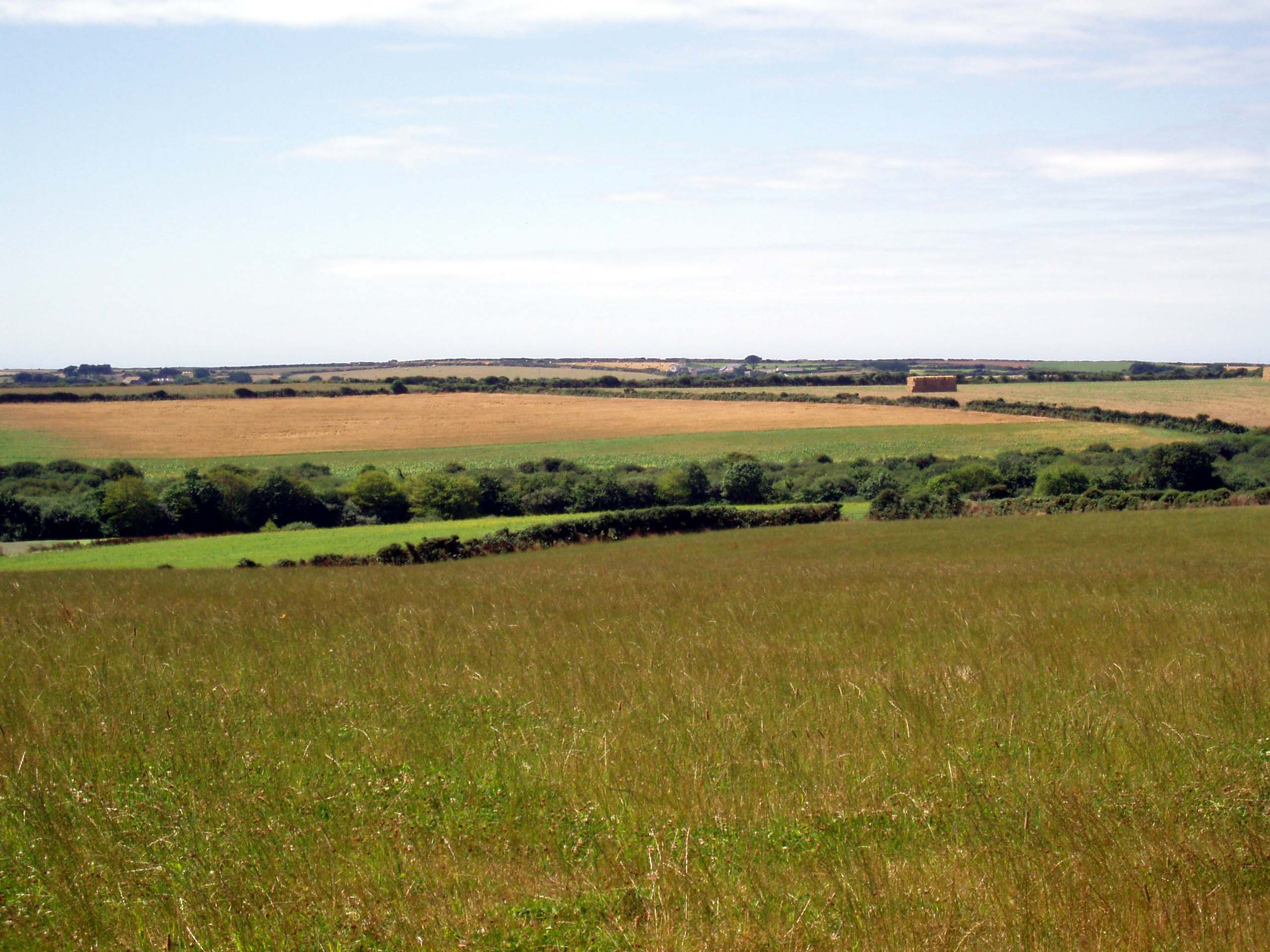
Farmland in St Buryan parish looking south towards the sea

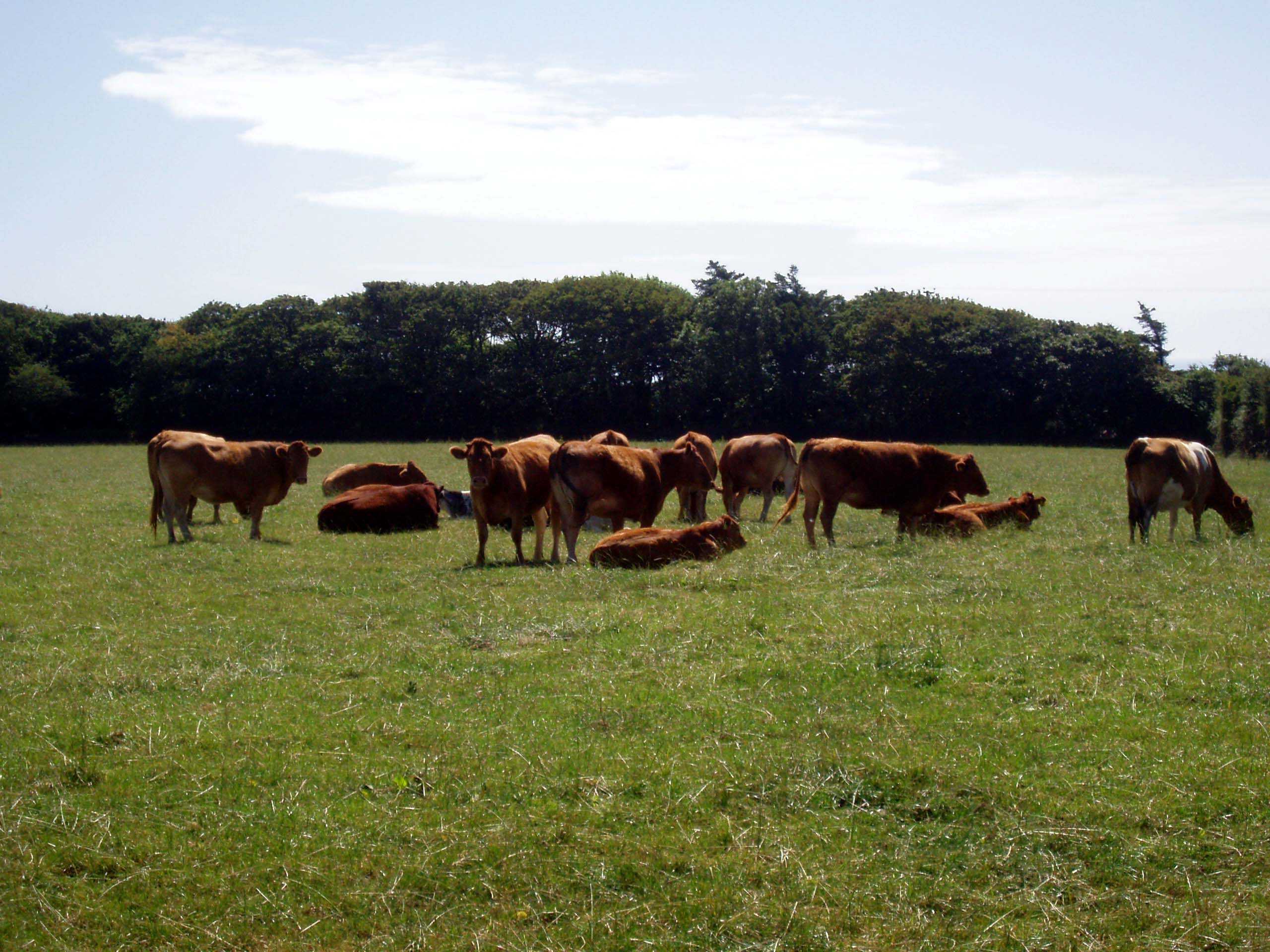
Cattle being raised in the south of the district

Like much of the rest of the country, farmers in Penwith have in recent years been put under financial pressure, due to a withdrawal of subsidies from the EU Common Agricultural Policy, pressure from supermarkets and crises such as foot and mouth in 2001. Agriculture in Penwith is predominantly dairy with some arable crops such as potatoes, cauliflower and broccoli (confusingly these are locally called broccoli and calebrese, respectively). Cornwall's mild climate and an absence of hard winter frosts mean that these cold-sensitive crops can be produced much earlier than in the rest of the country, and early Cornish new potatoes are a lucrative source of income. Unfortunately this cash crop has come under pressure in recent years due to globalization, which means competition with cheap imports from Egypt.

In 2002 the Farm Business Centre was set up to help farmers and farm businesses across Penwith. The centre aims to expand the local agricultural sector and provide advice and funding for farmers in the transition from intensive farming toward more sustainable agriculture. This encourages farmers to seek out novel sources of income such as set-aside and organic and small scale specialist produce such as meat from rare breed animals. A priority 4.6 grant from Objective One, plus funding from the Department for Environment, Food and Rural Affairs totalling more than £300,000 have ensured the centre’s future until September 2008.

=== Tourism ===
Penwith's scenery makes it a popular holiday destination. Local attractions including the Minack Theatre, South West Coast Path, Land's End and the Blue Flag beach at Sennen Cove ensure that tourism plays a major part in Penwith's economy. Additionally, St. Ives has in recent years become a popular New Year's Eve venue. Penwith also has the highest concentration of Neolithic sites in Europe, including monuments at The Merry Maidens, Lanyon Quoit, Chûn Quoit and an Iron Age village at Chysauster. Tourism accounts for 25% of Cornwall's GDP and 19% of households in Penwith derive their income from this activity.

== Media ==
Since 1878, Penwith has had a weekly newspaper, The Cornishman, based in Penzance. As well as Penwith, the paper covers the Isles of Scilly.

Penwith has its own community radio station, Coast FM (formerly Penwith Radio), which was launched on 5 November 2016 and broadcasts in West Cornwall on 96.5 and 97.2 FM.

== Penwith District Council ==
The district was created on 1 April 1974, under the Local Government Act 1972, as a merger of Penzance and St. Ives boroughs, St Just urban district, and West Penwith Rural District, and was abolished and replaced by the Cornwall Unitary Council on 31 March 2009.

From 1972 until 1974, a shadow Penwith authority existed where sitting members of the above-mentioned authorities acted in an advisory manner. With the abolition of the predecessor authorities in 1974 St Ives, Hayle, Marazion and St Just obtained town council status and from within their ranks began to elect town mayors. Penzance failed to obtain parish status for the former borough and charter trustees were appointed to continue elections for the position of Mayor of the town. Charter trustees being the sitting members of Penwith District Council within the former borough area.

Penzance Town Council was finally created in 1980 initially electing 15 members, this was expanded to 20 members in 1999. From 1974 to the mid-1980s, Penwith District Council was dominated by independent members, only 4 out of the 34 councillors in 1981 held any political allegiance (a situation reflected in other Cornish authorities at this time). By the late 1980s, however, the council became increasingly party politicised with the Conservative Party being the major political force on the council often forming coalitions with Conservative supporting independents to ensure the day-to-day operation of the Council. With the general downturn nationally for the Conservatives in 1990s, the Labour Party and to a lesser extent the Liberal Democrats began to make gains at the expense of Conservatives and at the high point of anti-conservative sentiment there remained only four Conservative councillors within the authority. In 1996, the council was successfully sued by Kevin Lippiatt, a homeless builder, after they had refused to add him to the electoral register; the case generated discussion around the right to vote for homeless people in the United Kingdom.

The Conservatives recovered their support from the mid-1990s to regain their position as the largest party on the Council with the Liberal Democrats now forming the largest opposition group. Despite this, the council remained hung with no overall control. The final political composition, at the 2007 elections, being: Conservatives 17, Liberal Democrats 12, Labour 1 (sits with Independent group) and Independent 5. The district was abolished as part of the 2009 structural changes to local government in England.

== Twinning ==
Since 1974 and until abolition the district of Penwith was twinned with

- Cuxhaven, Germany.

== Places of interest ==
Key
	Abbey/Priory/Cathedral
Accessible open space	Accessible open space
	Amusement/Theme Park
	Castle
Country Park	Country Park
	English Heritage
	Forestry Commission
Heritage railway	Heritage railway
Historic house	Historic House
Places of Worship	Places of Worship
Museum (free) Museum	Museum (free/not free)
National Trust	National Trust
	Theatre
	Zoo

- Barbara Hepworth Museum
- Carn Euny
- Castle An Dinas
- Chûn Castle
- Chûn Quoit
- Chysauster Ancient Village
- Geevor Tin Mine
- Godrevy Island
- Land's End
- Lanyon Quoit
- Logan Rock
- Mên-an-Tol
- The Merry Maidens
- Minack Theatre
- Mousehole
- Mousehole Wild Bird Hospital and Sanctuary
- Newlyn Art Gallery
- Paradise Park, Cornwall
- Penlee House
- Museum of Submarine Telegraphy
- South West Coast Path
- St Michael's Mount
- Tate St. Ives
- The Wayside Folk Museum
- Zennor Quoit

== See also ==
- West Penwith Rural District
- Beaches of Penwith
- Penwith hundred
