= Wayside Folk Museum =

Private museum in Cornwall, England

Coordinates: 50.191°N 5.567°W

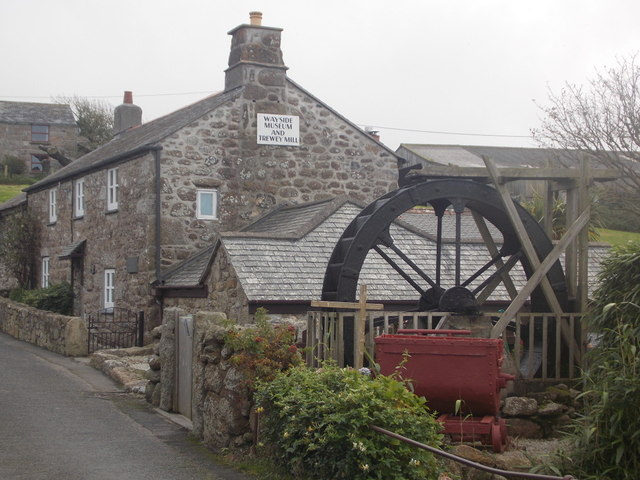
The Wayside Museum and Trewey Mill

The Wayside Folk Museum was a small private museum situated at Trewey Mill in the parish of Zennor in west Cornwall, United Kingdom. It was the oldest private museum in Cornwall.

The exhibition within the museum concentrated on the past lives, traditions and practices of the people of Zennor and Penwith. Displays included the kitchen and parlour of a miller's cottage, a mill house, a blacksmith's shop, and exhibits on fishing, farming, mining, domestic life and archaeology.

The museum closed in 2015 due to retirement.
