= Mên-an-Tol =

Neolithic standing stones in Cornwall, United Kingdom

- Men an Toll (Cornish)
- Crick Stone
- Mên-an-Tol in 2026

- Location within Southwest Cornwall
- Interactive map of Mên-an-Tol
- 50°09′31″N 5°36′16″W
- Type: Standing stones
- Periods: Neolithic / Bronze Age
- Location: Cornwall

Site notes
- Condition: Good
- Owner: CASPN
- Public access: Yes

Scheduled monument
- Official name: Stone setting and holed stone known as the Mên-an-Tol, 315m south east of Coronation Farm
- Designated: 14 December 1926
- Reference no.: 1004641

The Mên-an-Tol (Cornish: Men an Toll) is a small formation of standing stones in Cornwall, United Kingdom (grid reference SW426349). It is about three miles northwest of Madron. It is also known locally as the "Crick Stone".

== Location ==
The Mên-an-Tol stands near the Madron to Morvah road in Cornwall. Other antiquities in the vicinity include the Mên Scryfa inscribed stone about 300 metres to the north and the Boskednan stone circle less than 1 kilometre to the northeast.

== Name and etymology ==
Mên-an-Tol, the name of the monument is derived from the Cornish language and is spelt Men an Toll without diacritics in the modern Standard Written Form.

The name is composed of three elements: men, meaning "stone"; an, the definite article "the"; and toll, meaning "hole". The name therefore translates literally as "the stone of the hole" or "the holed stone". The name refers to the distinctive central stone of the monument, which contains a circular opening cut through the granite.

Earlier English spellings of the name often appear without diacritics, including Men-an-Tol and Men an Tol. These forms reflect English spelling conventions rather than different place-names.

English writers have sometimes translated the name directly as "the Holed Stone" or "the Holed Stone of Mên-an-Tol", describing the most distinctive feature of the monument rather than providing an alternative historical name.

Like many prehistoric monuments in Britain, the stones themselves are far older than the recorded place-name. The monument probably dates to the late Neolithic or early Bronze Age, and therefore predates the Cornish name by several millennia.

== Description ==
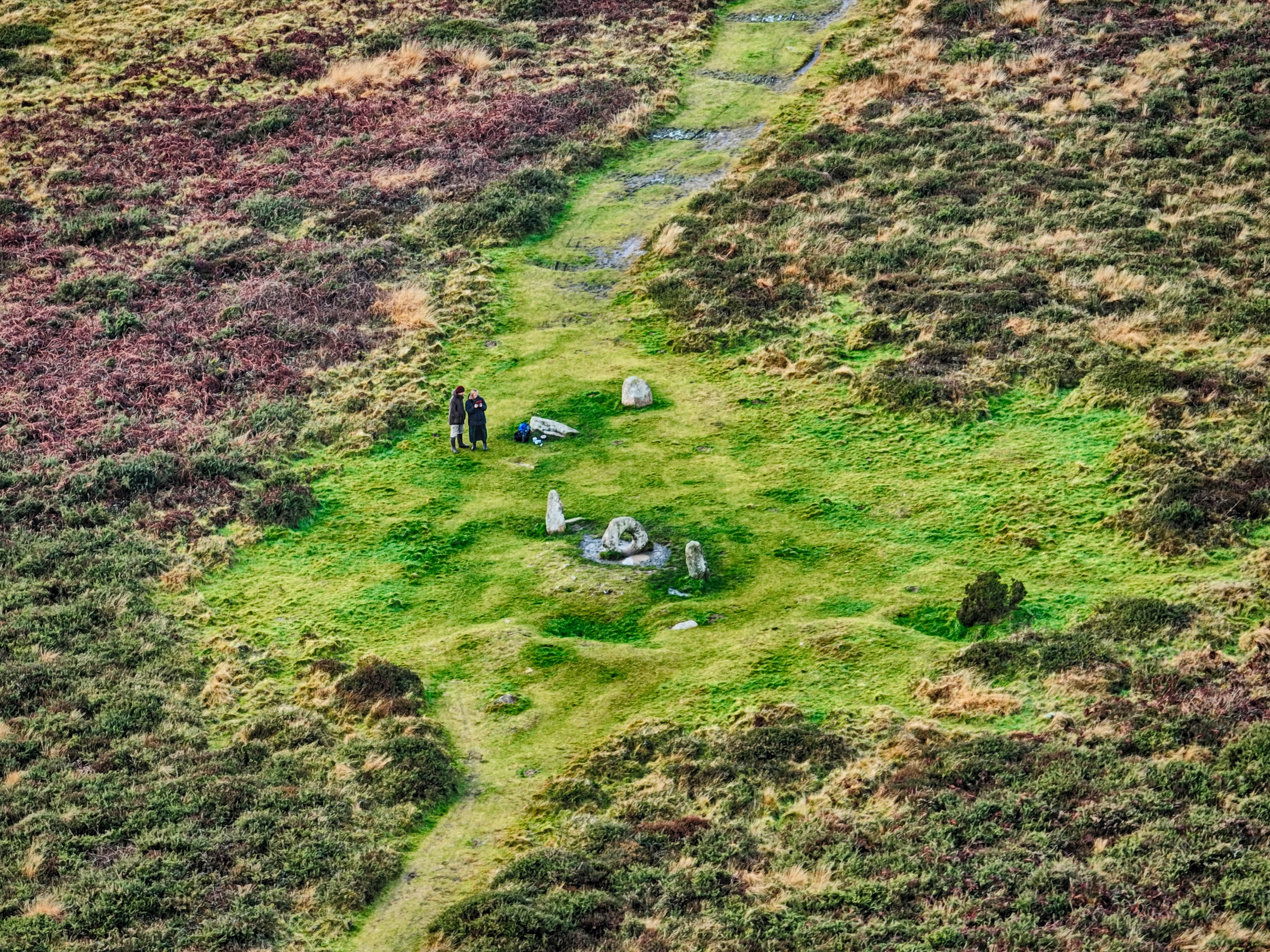
Aerial view of the Mên-an-Tol holed stone monument in Cornwall, England

The Mên-an-Tol consists of three upright granite stones: a round stone with its middle holed out with two standing stones to each side, in front of and behind the hole.

The two side stones are both about 1.2 metres high. The westernmost stone was moved and brought into a straight line with the other two stones sometime after 1815. The holed stone is roughly octagonal in outline. It is 1.3 metres wide and 1.1 metres high; the circular hole is 0.5 m in diameter. The only other holed stone in Cornwall of this type is the Tolvan holed stone which can be seen in a garden near Helston.

There is one other standing stone nearby, and six recumbent stones, some of which are buried. A cairn exists as a low stony mound just to the southeast. There are two other early Bronze Age barrows or cairns between 120 and 150 metres to the north.

== Interpretation ==
The Mên-an-Tol is thought to date to either the late Neolithic or early Bronze Age. The holed stone could originally have been a natural occurrence rather than deliberately sculpted.

The distribution of the stones around the site has led to the suggestion that the monument is actually part of a stone circle. If so, then it is likely that the stones have been rearranged at some point, and the two standing stones either side of the holed stone may have been moved from their original positions. It has also been suggested that the holed stone could have been a capstone for the nearby cairn before being moved to its present position.

== History ==
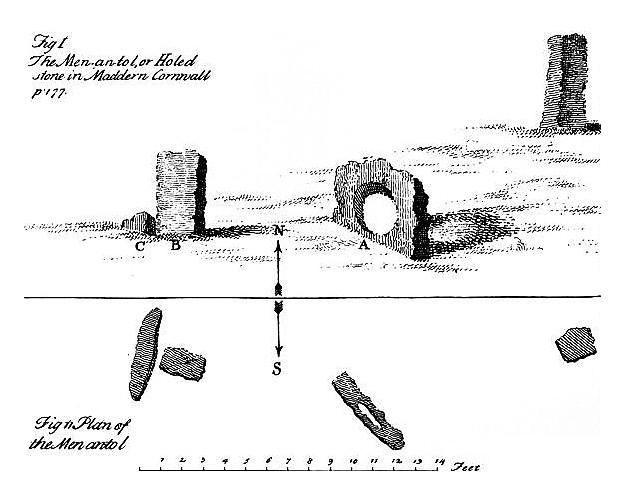
Drawing and plan by W. Borlase, 1769

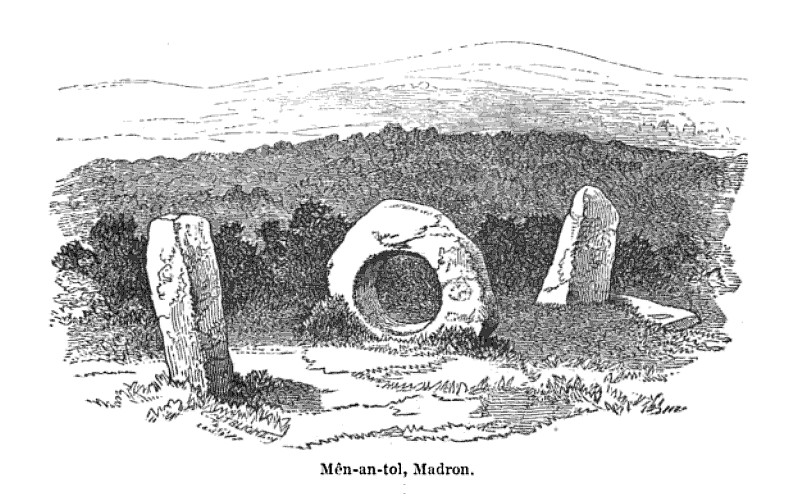
Drawing by J. T. Blight, 1864

In 1749 the site was first archaeologically investigated by William Borlase, who also drew a plan. This shows that the megaliths were not in a line like today, but formed an angle of about 135°. Borlase also reported that farmers had taken away some stones from the area. From him comes the first written record of the myths and rituals.

In the 19th Century the local antiquary John Thomas Blight published several drawings of the site, and made the first suggestion that the stones could be the remains of a stone circle. In 1872 William Copeland Borlase, a descendant of the earlier Borlase, gave a more detailed description of the area.

In 1932 Hugh O'Neill Hencken wrote the first modern archaeological report. He believed that the position of the stones was not the prehistoric arrangement, but had been significantly changed. He also thought that the holed stone might be part of a destroyed tomb. He was even told that local farmers with back or limb complaints would crawl through the hole to relieve their pain.

In 1993, the Cornwall Historic Environment Service published a detailed report with the latest research results. They suggested that the standing stones originated from a stone circle which consisted of 18 to 20 stones. The holed stone, however, could be part of a nearby portal tomb. It also possible that the holed stone stood at the center of the stone circle and served to frame specific points on the horizon. Such a use of a holed stone is not known in other sites, although the nearby stone circle of Boscawen-Un does have a central standing stone.

== In folklore ==
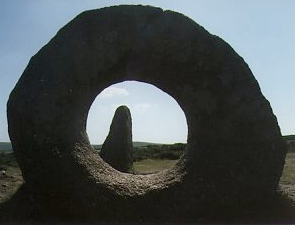
A view through the Mên-an-Tol holed stone

Mên-an-Tol is supposed to have a fairy or piskie guardian who can make miraculous cures. In one story, a changeling baby was put through the stone in order for the mother to get the real child back. Evil piskies had changed her child, and the ancient stones were able to reverse their evil spell. Another legend is that passage through the stone will cure a child of rickets (osteomalacia). For centuries, children with rickets were passed naked through the hole in the middle stone nine times.

== Popular culture ==
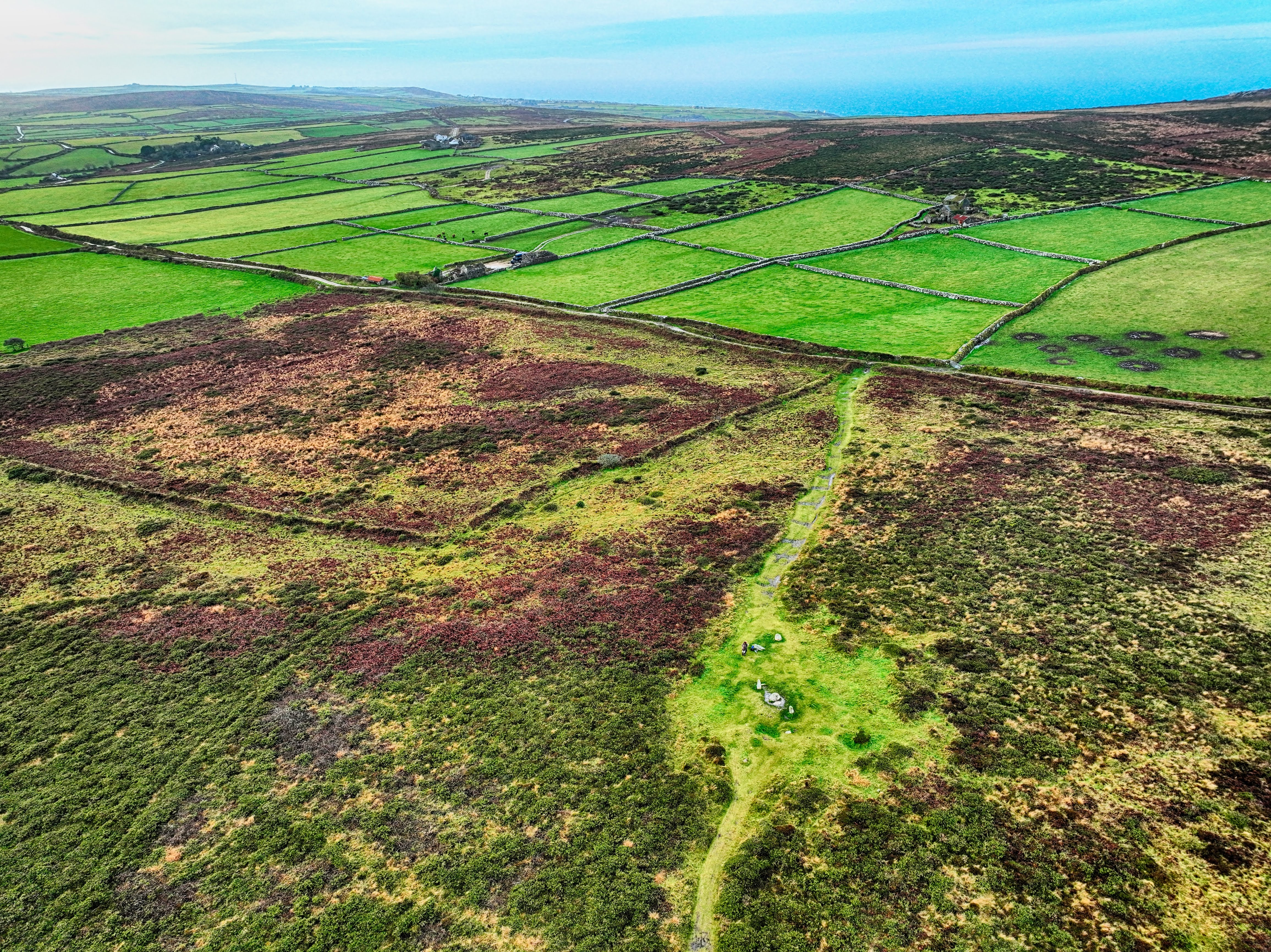
Men An Tol from the air

Many of the visitors to Mên-an-Tol have their photograph taken placing their heads through the central hole.

The Cornish poet D. M. Thomas referred to Mên-an-Tol as "the wind's vagina".

The song "Men-An-Tol" appears on the Zeitgeist album by the Levellers.

The Men-An-Tol also features prominently in the novel The Little Country by Charles de Lint.

"Mén-An-Tol" is the name of a level in the 2017 game Monument Valley 2.

"Mén-An-Tol" is a song on the 2018 album The Four Worlds by Mark Pritchard.

"Men an Toll" is a piece on the 2022 Cornish language album Tresor by Gwenno.

Men An Tol is a black metal band from New Zealand, while Mên An Tol (with diacritic) is a folk/Britpop band from London.
