= Mulfra Quoit =

Dolmen in the Cornwall region, England

- Koyt Molvra (Cornish)
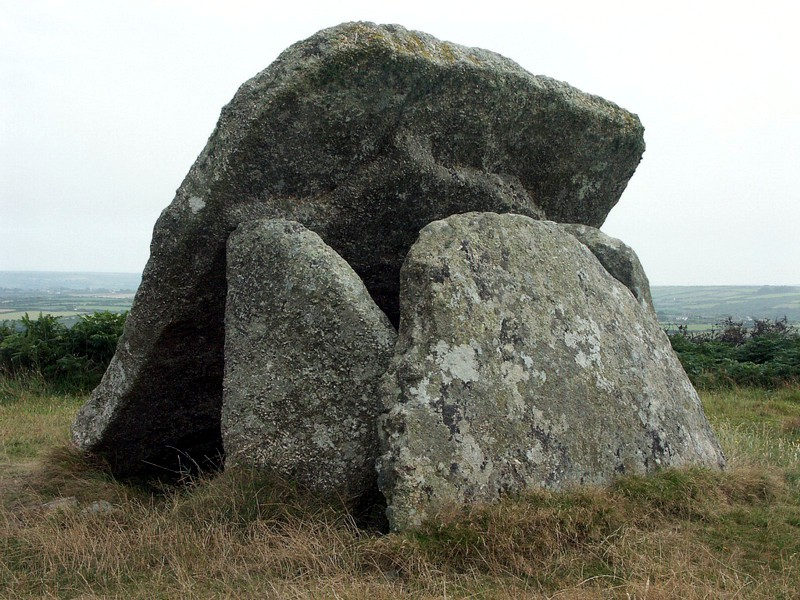

- Location within Southwest Cornwall
- 50.16327°N 5.56977°W
- Type: Dolmen
- Periods: Neolithic
- Location: Cornwall

Scheduled monument
- Official name: Portal dolmen known as Mulfra Quoit
- Designated: 10 August 1923
- Reference no.: 1006744

Mulfra Quoit (Cornish: Koyt Molvra) (grid reference SW451353) is a Neolithic dolmen in the county of Cornwall in England. It stands on Mulfra Hill to the north of the hamlet of Mulfra.

== Location ==
The Quoit is located west of Penzance between Porthmeor and New Mill on the top of Mulfra Hill, from where you can look to the sea over the surrounding hills.

== Structure ==
Mulfra Quoit is similar to Chûn Quoit five kilometers away. The quoit has three 1.7m-high support stones, arranged in a U-shape 3.0m long and 1.7m wide, and open on one side. The capstone, which has slipped down, measures 3.2m by 3.0m, and is almost square; it has a weight of 5 tonnes. Since some of the stones that formed the chamber are missing, it is difficult to get an idea of its original form, but it is possible that four pillars supported the capstone slab as with Chûn Quoit. On the other hand, the capstone has a central bulge on its underside, which would give the stone a stable position on the existing three pillars. Mulfra Quoit was apparently covered by a mound, the remnants of which are still present.

== Research ==
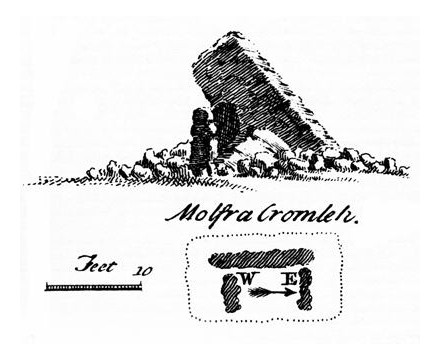
View and floor plan of the Mulfra quoit – Drawing by William Borlase, 1769

In 1769 the antiquarian, William Borlase published a plan and a drawing of the quoit and described a 60 cm-high stone embankment, which encircled the dolmen with a diameter of 12m, of which, nothing can be seen today. Borlase also mentioned a further stone, which he thought was part of the capstone, but this stone no longer exists. The ground was covered with a 30 cm-thick soil, which Borlase thought was part of the original mound. In 1872 his descendant William Copeland Borlase examined an accumulation of stone in the centre of the dolmen, and undertook excavations which only yielded charred wood. W. C. Borlase refuted a local story that the dolmen had been damaged by a lightning strike in 1752, because his ancestor in 1749, had found it in much the same state as it is today.

Due to its poor state of conservation later writers gave it scant attention: Hencken in 1932 compared it to Chûn Quoit and simply called it "a very similar but less perfect chamber." In 1950 Glyn Daniel did little more than mention the name of the quoit and classified it as a "typical rectangular" chamber, although he did provide a plan of the structure.
