= Trewey =

Hamlet in Cornwall, England

Trewey: Cornish: Tredhewi
- Hamlet
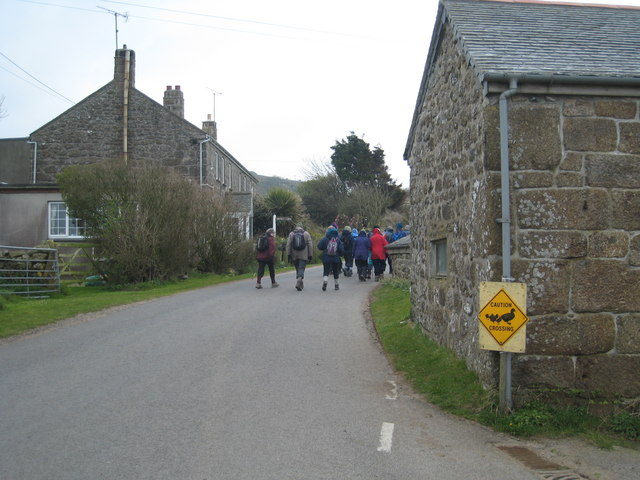

- Location within Cornwall
- Unitary authority: Cornwall
- Region: South West
- Country: England
- Sovereign state: United Kingdom
- Police: Devon and Cornwall
- Fire: Cornwall
- Ambulance: South Western

Trewey (Cornish: Tredhewi, meaning David's farmstead) is a hamlet in the parish of Zennor, Cornwall, England, United Kingdom.

== See also ==
- Wayside Folk Museum
