= West Lanyon Quoit =

Dolmen in the Cornwall region, England

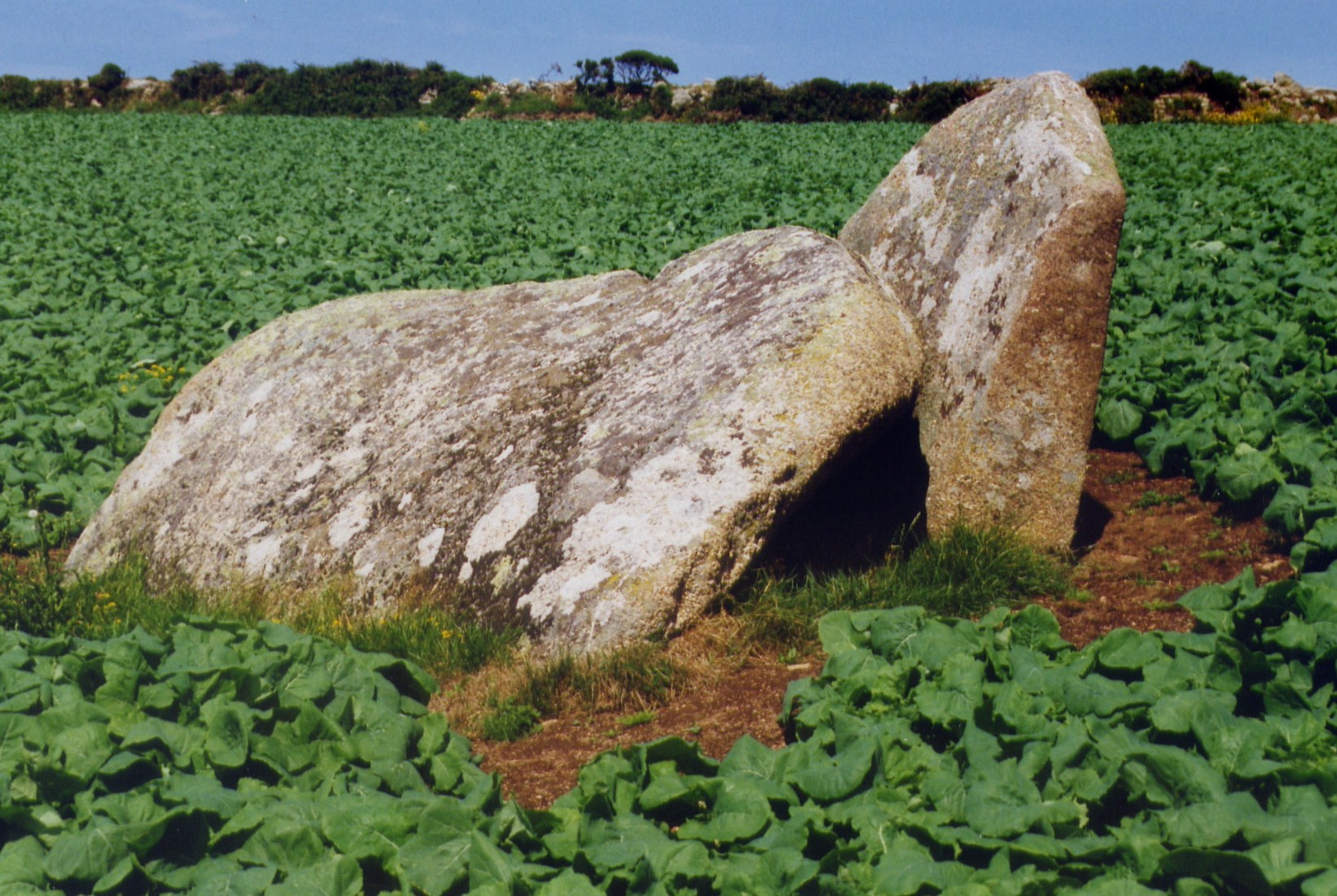
- Remains of West Lanyon Quoit

- Location within Southwest Cornwall
- 50.147703°N 5.607821°W
- Type: Dolmen
- Periods: Neolithic
- Location: Cornwall

Site notes
- Height: 1.6 metres (5 ft 3 in)

Scheduled monument
- Official name: Portal dolmen known as West Lanyon Quoit, 380m south west of Lanyon Farm
- Designated: 14 December 1926
- Reference no.: 1006698

West Lanyon Quoit (Cornish: Koyt Lynnyeyn West), also known as Lower Lanyon Quoit, is the remains of a prehistoric dolmen situated in the parish of Madron in Cornwall, England grid reference SW423337. It was excavated in the late 18th century, and much of the structure has since been destroyed. On 14 December 1926 West Lanyon Quoit became a scheduled monument listed as "Portal dolmen known as West Lanyon Quoit, 380m south west of Lanyon Farm".

== Location ==
West Lanyon Quoit is located northwest of Penzance near the road between Madron and Morvah. It stands 300 metres to the southwest of the road. 700 metres to the east stands the much more famous Lanyon Quoit.

== Description ==
At the present day all that can be seen of West Lanyon Quoit are two large stones. One support stone (probably the southwest stone of the chamber) is still standing: it is 1.6 metres high and 1.5 metres wide. The capstone, which rests against it, is 4.1 metres long and 2.6 metres wide.

== Discovery and excavation ==
West Lanyon Quoit was originally covered by a large barrow mound. The burial chamber only came to light in the late 18th century. The account of the discovery was published in volume 14 of Archaeologia in 1803. This describes how the landowner had directed his servants to remove the earth from the barrow for compost. When the servants had removed "near a hundred cart-loads" they discovered "the supporters of a cromlech, from which the coverstone was slipped off on the fourth side, but still leaning against them." The chamber was orientated north-east to south-west: the northeast end was open. The chamber was rectangular and its measurements were given as 10 feet by 5 feet by 5 feet. Digging into the chamber led to the discovery of a broken urn, ashes, and some human bones. Given that the chamber was full of mound material, it is now thought that the tomb had been opened previously and that the urn and bones were a secondary, probably Bronze Age, cremation burial.
