= Walter C. Lanyon =

Walter Clemow Lanyon (October 27, 1887 - July 4, 1967) was the author of more than 40 books on New Thought spirituality.

== History ==
Little is known about Lanyon's personal life except that he was an Englishman of Cornish stock born in the United States in 1887. He was educated in the US, France, and England, and served as interpreter and foreign correspondent. For decades he traveled all over the world, investigating and studying the various presentations of Christian teachings. He traveled and lectured all over the world. His lectures were based, he said, "solely on the revelation of Jesus Christ."

In addition to his books, Lanyon was credited with having written two light operas as well as several secular stories, plays and articles, all of which are now lost. This is also true of paintings he is said to have exhibited in Europe and the USA.

Lanyon knew and communicated with Father Divine as documented in a letter between them.

Lanyon died in California on July 4, 1967 at the age of 79.

== Books (partial listing) ==
- And It Was Told of a Certain Potter (1917)
- Embers (1918)
- Your Home (1918)
- Has It Ever Occurred To You? (1919)
- Abd Allah, Teacher, Healer (1921)
- A Royal Diadem (1921)
- Treatment (1921)
- Demonstration (1921)
- Your Heritage (1923)
- The Joy Bringer (1925)
- Leaves of the Tree (1925)
- London Notes and Lectures (1928)
- Impressions of a Nomad (1930)
- It Is Wonderful (1931)
- The Laughter of God (1932)
- The Eyes of the Blind (1932)
- Behold the Man (1933)
- Out of the Clouds (1934)
- A Lamp Unto My Feet (1936)
- The Temple Not Made With Hands (1936)
- Thrust In the Sickle (1936)
- A Light Set Upon a Hill (1938)
- I Came (1940)
- That Ye Might Have (1940)
- Life More Abundant (1940)
- Without the Smell of Fire (1941)
- 2 A.M. (1944)
- The Impatient Dawn (1946)
- Ask (1970)
