= Mike Lanyon =

Australian rules footballer

Personal information
- Full name: Mike Lanyon
- Born: 6 April 1951 (age 75)
- Original team: Doveton
- Height: 178 cm (5 ft 10 in)
- Weight: 73 kg (161 lb)

Playing career^{1}
Years	Club	Games (Goals)
1972	St Kilda	6 (4)
- ^{1} Playing statistics correct to the end of 1972.

Mike Lanyon (born 6 April 1951) is a former Australian rules footballer who played with St Kilda in the Victorian Football League (VFL).
