= Chûn Castle =

Iron Age hillfort in Cornwall, England

- Kastel Chi an Woon (Cornish)
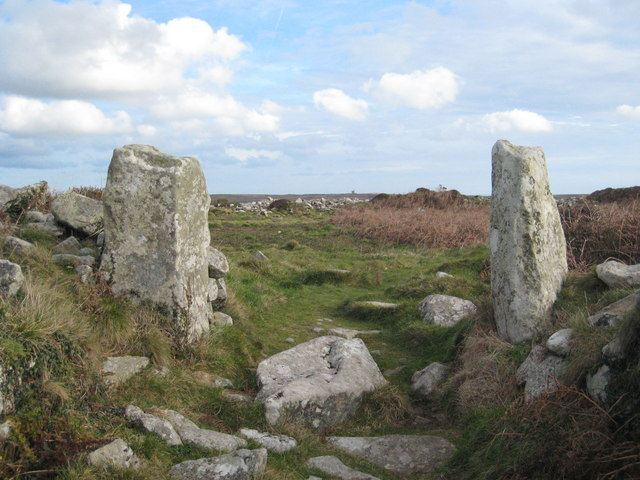
- Entrance to Chûn Castle

- Location within Cornwall
- 50.1487°N 5.6337°W
- Type: hill fort
- Periods: Iron Age

Site notes
- Excavation dates: 1895, 1925, 1927 and 1930

Scheduled monument
- Part of: Chun Downs prehistoric landscape complex, incorporating Chun Cromlech, Chun Castle, and barrow 200yds (180m) SW of Chun Farm

Chûn Castle (Cornish: Kastel Chi an Woon, meaning castle of the house of the moor) is a large Iron Age hillfort (ringfort) near Penzance in Cornwall, England, United Kingdom. The fort was built about 2,500 years ago, and fell into disuse until the early centuries AD when it was possibly re-occupied to protect the nearby tin mines. It stands beside a prehistoric trackway that was formerly known as the Old St Ives Road and the Tinners’ Way. The name Chûn derives from Cornish: Chi an Woon (‘the house on the downs’). The area is now sometimes known as Chûn Downs. Nearby is Chûn Quoit.

== Description ==
Edward Lluyd made a plan of this fort in around 1700, remarking that its structure and security showed "military knowledge superior to that of any other works of this kind which I have seen in Cornwall". Notably, the fort has a strategic inner and outer wall and ditch. The remains today are still clearly visible, even though the once twenty-feet-odd walls now stand at around five feet, due to its use in the 19th century as a quarry for buildings in Penzance and Madron. The freehold of the land beneath part of the castle was put up for auction in April 1883 as part of freehold tenement of Little Bosullow. Included were large quantities of good building stone. At the 1886 annual meeting of the Penzance Natural History and Antiquarian Society, concern was shown for the removal of stone from here, as well as Kenidjack Castle and Madron Well.

The fort was excavated in 1895, 1925, 1927 and 1930. Much pottery was uncovered; the earliest was dated to the 4th century BC due to its similarity to known Breton pottery of that age. But the fort may have been built upon a much older structure. Chûn Quoit, around 800 feet to the west, is dated to around 2400 BC. It is believed that the fort fell into disuse around the first century AD but was reoccupied and modified several centuries later, until the 6th century. However, occupation may also date to the later Roman period.

The fort may have been built to protect tin and copper gathered in the tin-rich locality of what is now Pendeen, with its Geevor Tin Mine, and surrounding villages. Iron and tin slags were found within the fort, near the well. The fort overlooks many miles of the Celtic Sea to the north, and overlooks the only land route to this peninsula (West Penwith) to the south. Therefore, not only its structure but its location suggest a much more actively military function.

The well, within the inner walls, once had a stairway leading to the water, water which remains to this day even during dry spells. Locals used the well water until the 1940s for domestic purposes and some for superstitious reasons, viz. the endowment of perpetual youth. Neopagans still make pilgrimages to the site on religiously significant days.

== See also ==
- Ringfort
- List of hill forts in England
- List of hill forts in Scotland
- List of hill forts in Wales
