= Lanyon Quoit =

Dolmen in Cornwall, England

- Koyt Lynnyeyn (Cornish)
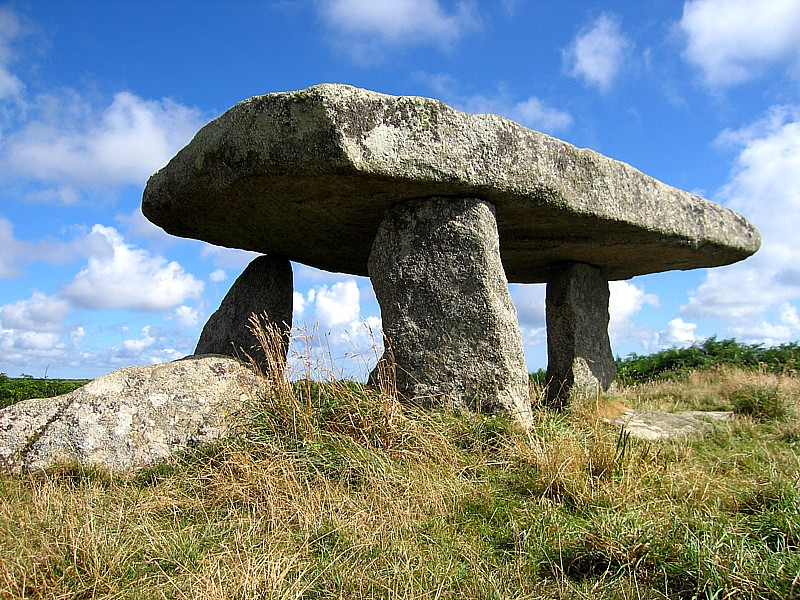
- The dolmen in 2006
- Interactive map of Lanyon Quoit
- 50.14750°N 5.599167°W
- Type: Dolmen
- Periods: Neolithic
- Location: Madron, England, United Kingdom

History
- Built: c. 3500 BC

Site notes
- Material: Stone
- Height: 1.5 m (4 ft 11 in)
- Length: 5.5 m (18 ft)
- Condition: Destroyed: 19 October 1815; Rebuilt: 1824
- Owner: National Trust

Scheduled monument
- Official name: Chambered long barrow known as Lanyon Quoit
- Designated: 10 August 1923
- Reference no.: 1006745

Lanyon Quoit (Cornish: Koyt Lynnyeyn, meaning cold pool quoit) is a dolmen in Cornwall, England, United Kingdom, 2 miles southeast of Morvah. It collapsed in a storm in 1815 and was re-erected nine years later, and as a result the dolmen is now very different from its original appearance.

== Location ==
Lanyon Quoit is located northwest of Penzance on the road between Madron and Morvah. It stands 50 metres to the east of the road.

700 metres to the west lie the remains of another dolmen known as West Lanyon Quoit.

== Description ==
Lanyon Quoit currently has three support stones which stand to a height of 1.5 metres. These bear a capstone which is 5.5 metres long, and which weighs more than 12 tonnes.

In the eighteenth century, the quoit had four supporting stones and the structure was tall enough for a person on horseback to ride under. On 19 October 1815, Lanyon Quoit fell down in a storm. Nine years later, enough money was raised by local inhabitants to re-erect the structure, under the guidance of Captain Giddy of the Royal Navy. One of the original stones was considered too badly damaged to put back in place, thus there are only three uprights today and the structure does not stand so high as it once did. One of the uprights was turned at right-angles when the quoit was re-erected, but that is the only part of it which had its orientation changed. The cap stone is still aligned much as it was before the monument fell. The quoit lies at the north end of a long barrow 26 metres long and 12 metres wide. The barrow, which is covered by grass and bracken, is damaged and its outline is difficult to see. At the south end of the barrow are some more large stones that may be the remains of one or more cists.

== Investigations ==
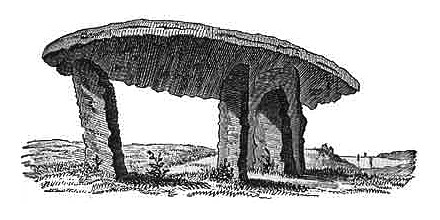
1769 etching by William Borlase of the Lanyon Quoit, before its collapse in 1815

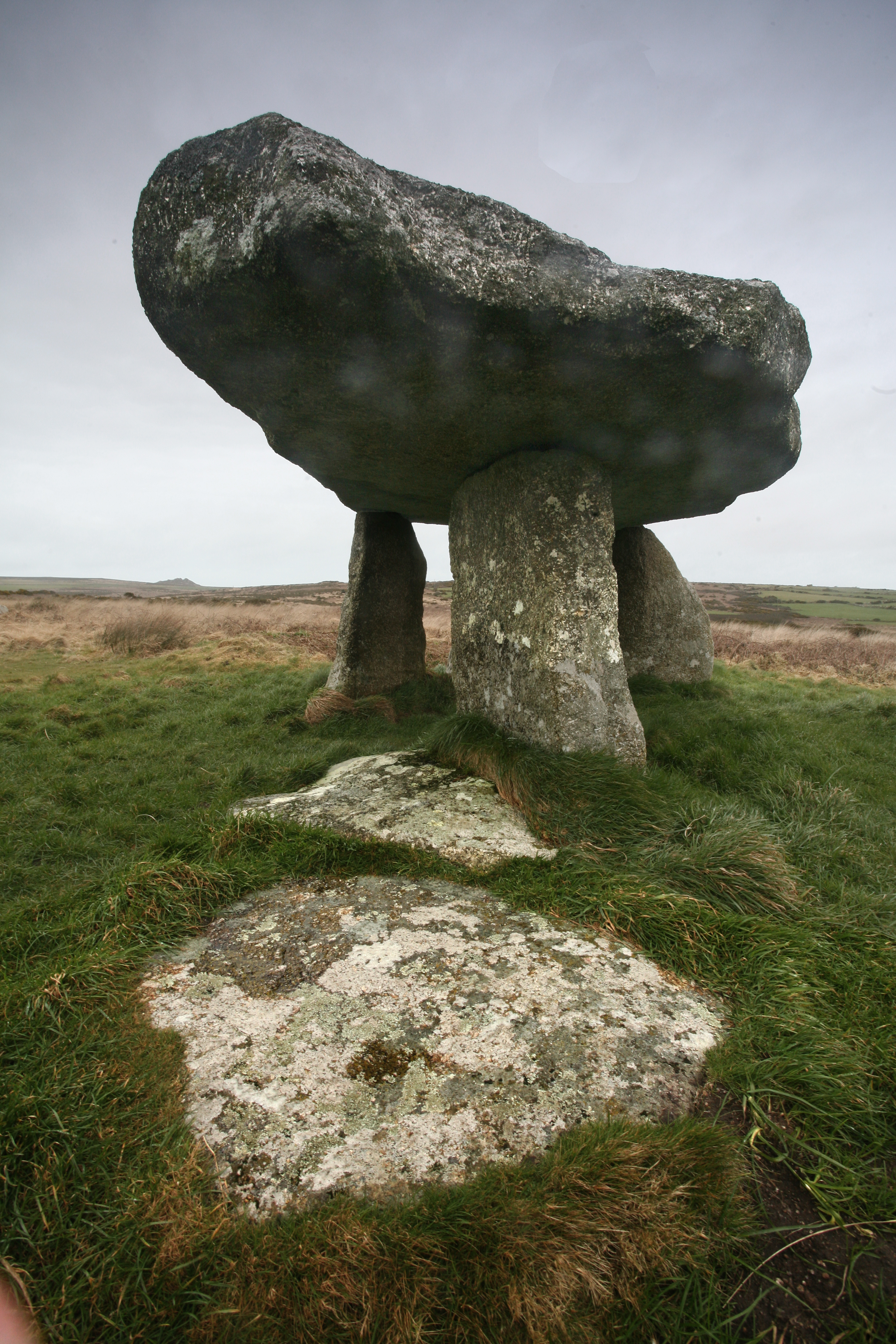
Lanyon Quoit looking north west

In 1769, William Borlase described the megalithic site for the first time in a publication, illustrated with etchings in which the Lanyon Quoit's design and floor plan has a different look from today, given changes made following its 1815 collapse. Lanyon Quoit collapsed in a storm in 1815 and was re-erected in 1824.

An etching from 1857 by R. T. Pentreath shows the megaliths in their present arrangement. A similar drawing appears in the 1864 book A Week at the Land's End by John Thomas Blight.

In 1872, William Borlase, a descendant of the earlier Borlase, conducted further investigations and excavations were carried out. He reproduced the etchings of his ancestor and found them much more valuable than any other contemporary sketch since the monument had been subjected to such considerable change.

In 1952, the then owner Edward Bolitho from Tregwainton donated the plot of land with the monument to the National Trust.
