= John Lanyon Whiting =

John Lanyon Whiting (February 23, 1851 – September 15, 1922) was a lawyer and politician in Ontario, Canada. He served as mayor of Kingston in 1886.

The son of Reverend Richard Whiting and Mary Philp, both natives of England, he was born in Amherstburg, Essex County and was educated at Victoria University. Whiting articled in Pembroke and Kingston, was called to the Ontario bar in 1877 and entered practice with a law firm in Kingston. He represented St. Lawrence ward on Kingston city council from 1883 to 1885.

He died in Kingston at the age of 71.
