= John Thomas Blight =

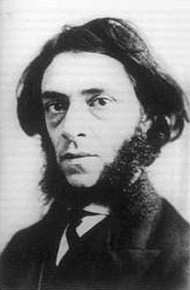
- Born: 27 October 1835; Redruth, Cornwall
- Died: 23 January 1911 (aged 75); Bodmin Mental Asylum
- Occupations: Antiquarian and draughtsman
- Parent: Robert Blight

For the Australian poet, see John Blight.

John Thomas Blight FSA (27 October 1835 – 23 January 1911) was a Cornish archaeological artist born near Redruth in Cornwall, England, UK.

His father, Robert, a teacher, moved the family to Penzance and introduced his sons to the study of nature, antiquities and folk lore. John Blight was a natural draughtsman. By the age of 20, Blight had published a book on the antiquities of Penwith and a large collection of drawings.

His expansion of this work, in two volumes, was at first encouraged by Rev. R. S. Hawker and then the cause of a great quarrel. John Blight's second patron, James Halliwell, was similarly unhelpful, never paying him for his vast labour in illustrating Halliwell's projected edition of William Shakespeare's Works.

In the mid-1860s, Blight had a mental breakdown and was incarcerated for the remainder of his life in Bodmin Mental Asylum. Blight's recording of Cornish antiquities includes many that no longer exist. His descriptions and illustrations of them provide a most valuable source for archaeologists and local historians.

== Major works ==
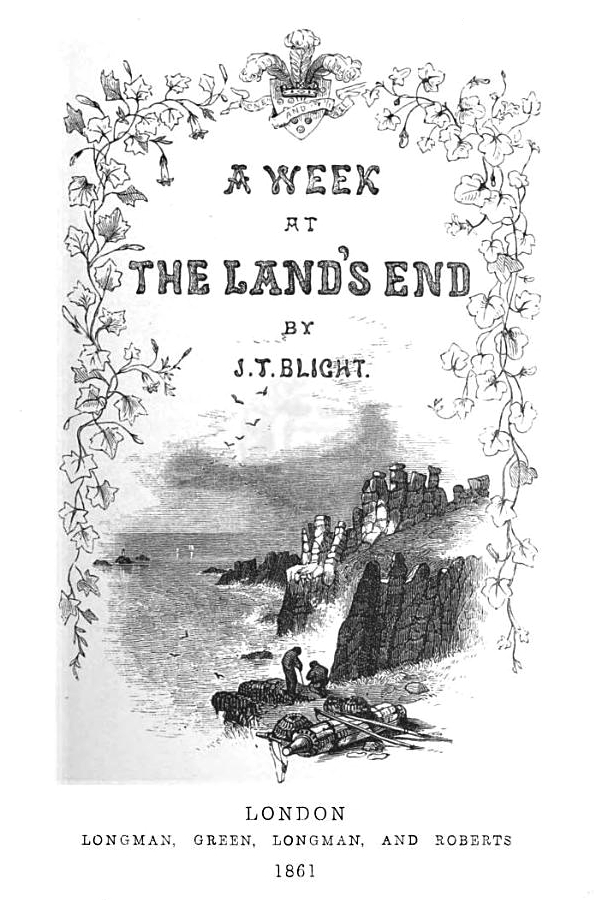
A Week at the Land's End; London, 1861

- Ancient Crosses and Other Antiquities in the East of Cornwall 3rd ed. (1872)
- Ancient Crosses and Other Antiquities in the West of Cornwall (1856), 2nd edition 1858. (3rd ed. Penzance: W. Cornish, 1872) (facsimile ed. reproducing 1856 ed.: Blight's Cornish Crosses; Penzance : Oakmagic Publications, 1997)
- A Week at the Land's End (1861) (Facsimile ed. of 2nd ed published Truro: Lake and Lake, 1876: Alison Hodge, 1989)
