= Morvah =

Coordinates: 50.161°N 5.639°W

Morvah: Cornish: Morvedh
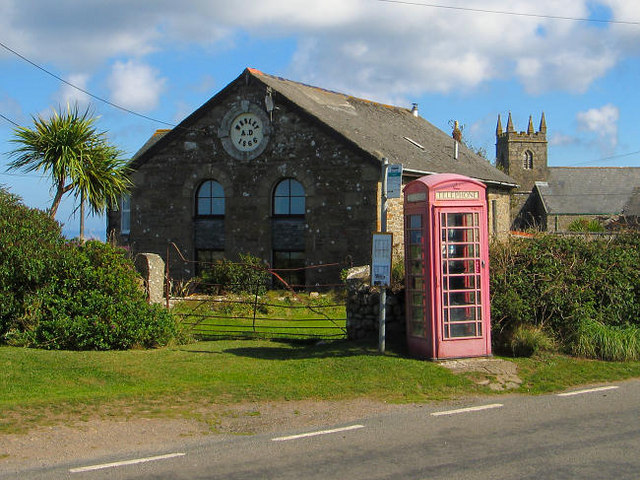
- Morvah chapel with Anglican Church in the background

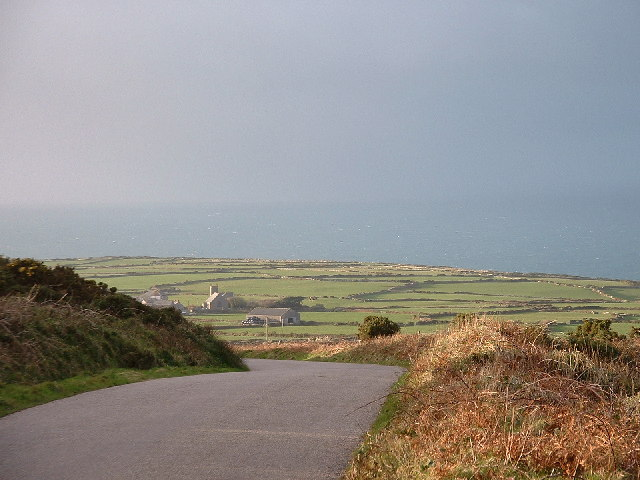
- Plain in Morvah with the Atlantic beyond from above Trevowhan

- Location within Cornwall
- Population: 49 (2011)
- OS grid reference: SW402353
- Civil parish: Morvah
- Unitary authority: Cornwall
- Ceremonial county: Cornwall
- Region: South West
- Country: England
- Sovereign state: United Kingdom
- Post town: PENZANCE
- Postcode district: TR20
- Dialling code: 01736
- Police: Devon and Cornwall
- Fire: Cornwall
- Ambulance: South Western
- UK Parliament: St Ives

Morvah (Cornish: Morvedh) is a civil parish and village on the Penwith peninsula in west Cornwall, England, United Kingdom. The parish has a population of 49.

== Geography ==
The village is centred approximately eight miles (13 km) west-southwest of St Ives and 5 1/2 miles (8.9 km) north-west of Penzance. Morvah parish encompasses the settlements of Chypraze and Rosemergy and is bounded by the parishes of St Just to the west, Zennor to the north-east, Madron to the south and by the sea in the north. The parish consists of 1,270 acres (5 km^{2}) of land, 1-acre (0.40 ha) of water and 14 acres (5.7 ha) of foreshore.

The small churchtown of Morvah lies along the B3306 road which connects St Ives to the A30 road and consists of housing, a dairy farm and the parish church, St Bridget's. The chancel and nave were rebuilt in 1828, leaving the two-staged, unbuttressed west tower from the 14th-century. There is a community art gallery and cafe in the old schoolhouse building.

Morvah lies within the Cornwall Area of Outstanding Natural Beauty (AONB). The South West Coast Path, which follows the coast of south west England from Somerset to Dorset passes by on the cliffs to the north of Morvah churchtown.

== History ==
=== Antiquities ===
Evidence of a settlement at Morvah in the early Middle Ages is in the form of an inscribed stone known as the Mên Scryfa; it is a memorial to one 'Rialobranus son of Cunovalus', located in a field on a moor about three kilometres from the village. It was first described in a letter written by the antiquary Edward Lhwyd. The inscription has been dated from the fifth to the eighth century., but more firmly and authoritatively dated to the middle third of the 6th century by Professor Charles Thomas (And Shall these Mute Stones Speak, University of Wales Press 1994). In fact, this inscribed stone stands in the parish of Madron, a good mile east of Morvah parish. The finest antiquities of Morvah parish are the Neolithic dolmen of Chûn Quoit (c. 3500 BC) and the nearby Iron Age hillfort (c. 300 BC) of Chûn Castle (half of which is also in Madron parish), as well as the Late Iron Age settlement of four distinctively local courtyard houses at Croftoe. These include a rare "semi-detached" dwelling.

=== Morvah Gold Hoard ===
In 1884 during quarrying for building materials at Morvah, on the coast at Carne Farm, (which lies about half a mile north of Chûn Castle and quoit), a hoard of gold ornaments was found dating from the late Bronze Age. The hoard of gold bracelets discovered here consisted of six large bracelets, three with distinctive trumpet-like ends. One also has engraved geometric designs on it. These bracelets were almost certainly either made in Ireland or made from Irish gold, and made their way, probably through trade in exchange for tin, to Cornwall. They now reside in the British Museum but are a vivid reminder of how relatively well-off Cornwall was in prehistoric times. In 2007 there have been calls in the local Cornish press for the gold hoard to be returned to Cornwall from the British Museum.

=== Mining ===
Morvah Consols was probably first opened in the 1820s and in 1851 was reported in the Cornish Telegraph newspaper as a new copper mine, with funding by the Levant adventurers. The remains that can be seen today were built from 1871 and was worked by a steam engine with a 30-inch cylinder. A second engine was bought from the Balleswidden Mine for pumping and stamping and was put up for auction in February 1884. In 1875 the Stanneries Court closed the mine after it only produced 5 tons 18 cwt of tin concentrate and wages had not been paid. An attempt to sell the mine by auction was abandoned following intimidation of the auctioneers by the mine's workers. Morvah Consols was agan put up for auction on 16 February 1884, initially in one lot. Items included a 24-inch cylinder engine, a 10-ton boiler, 20 fathoms of iron pumps, 16-head stamps, horse whim, wire rope, iron chains, carpenter's shop, iron, timber, etc.

There was an attempt to reopen the mine in 1929.

== Local government ==
For the purposes of local government Morvah is a civil parish. Morvah does not hold elections to a parish council but instead, holds a statutory meeting of electors of the parish every 12 months known as a parish meeting. The principal local authority in this area is Cornwall Council.

== Morvah Fair ==
Morvah was prior to the 20th century the home of the Morvah Fair (held on 1 August every year) which has been described as the biggest Lughnasadh celebrations outside Ireland. The fair was attended by a large number from across West Cornwall. The fair was also associated with the legend of "Jack the Tinkard". In the late 19th century the then priest of Morvah lead a successful campaign to ban the celebrations due to the excess of drunken and promiscuous behaviour. In a proclamation he stated

"The Church-Town of Morvah has for many years past been much resorted to on the First Sunday in August by disorderly persons of every description, much to the annoyance of the parishioners, he hereby cautions all such persons from assembling on that day for idle and profane amusement, so revolting to that great command of the Law of God – "Remember the Sabbath day to keep it holy" Strict orders have been given to the Constable and Officers of the Parish to take into custody any person who shall be found desecrating the Lord's Day."

Morvah now celebrates 'pasty day' instead, on the first Tuesday of every August.

== Shipwrecks ==
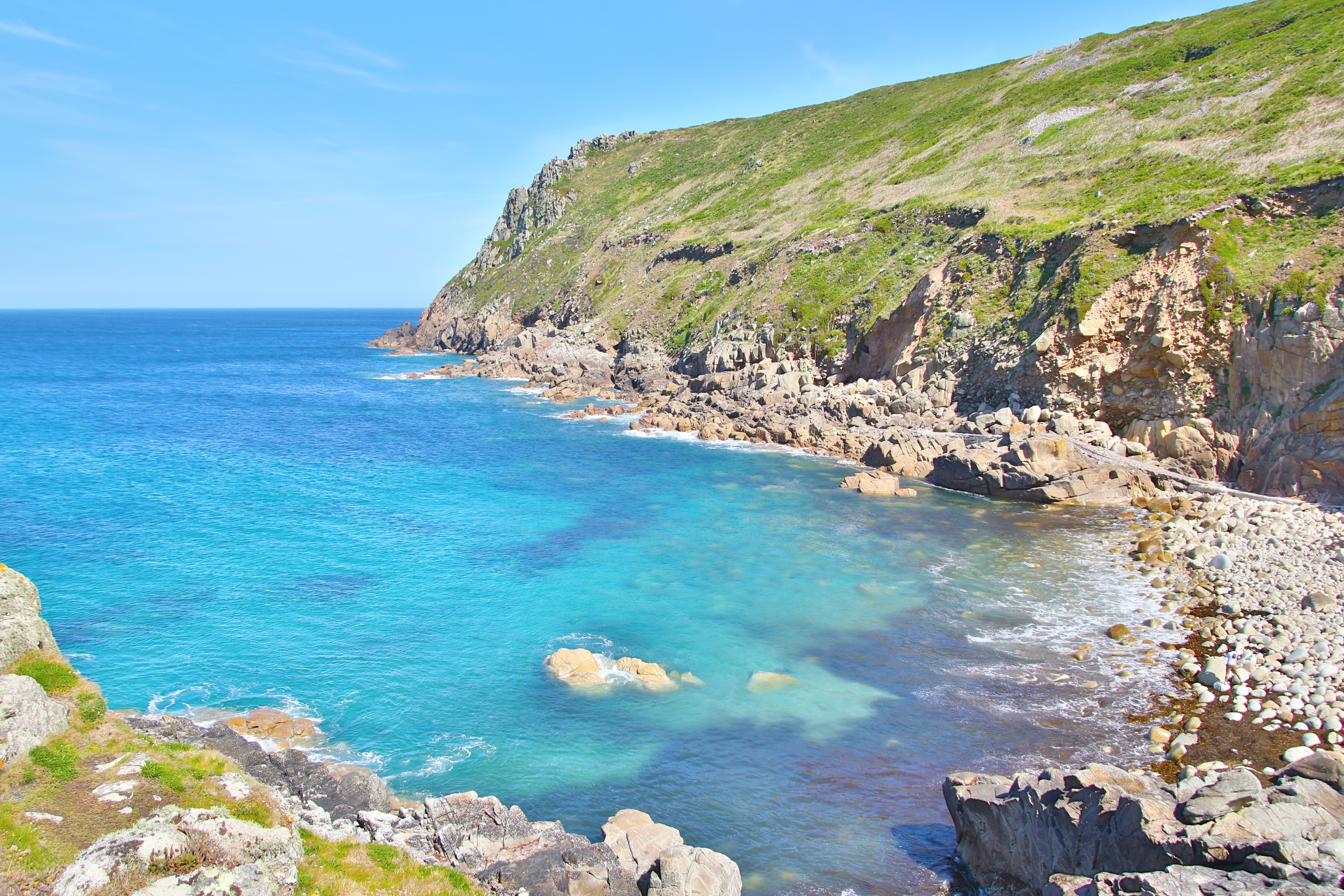
Porthnanven Cove Morvah Cornwall

The 9,000 tonne MV Karin Schepers (Netherlands), with a cargo which included petroleum ran onto a sandy beach under Trevean Cliff at 17 knots on 3 August 2011. The crew managed to refloat the ship and continue on its journey from Cork to Rotterdam. Falmouth Coastguard contacted the ship two hours before she went aground and made repeated calls as the ship appeared to ignore shipping lanes. The Sennen Lifeboat was first on the scene followed by a helicopter from RNAS Culdrose, both reported no sign of any crew on deck. Representatives of the Marine Accident Investigation Branch (MAIR) met with the crew after docking at Rotterdam. The ship also ran aground two years previously in the Baltic off Denmark.
