= Ludgvan, Madron, Gulval and Heamoor =

Electoral division of Cornwall in the UK

- ward Cornwall Council
- Boundary of Ludgvan, Madron, Gulval and Heamoor in Cornwall from 2021.
- County: Cornwall

Current ward
- Created: 2021
- Councillor: Juliet Line (Liberal Democrat)
- Number of councillors: One
- Created from: Ludgvan; Gulval and Heamoor; St Buryan

Ludgvan, Madron, Gulval and Heamoor is an electoral division of Cornwall in the United Kingdom which returns one member to sit on Cornwall Council. It was created at the 2021 local elections, being formed primarily from parts of the former divisions of Ludgvan and Gulval and Heamoor, as well as the part of Madron parish which had been in St Buryan electoral division. The current councillor is Juliet Line, a Liberal Democrat.

== Extent ==
The division includes the villages of Ludgvan, Madron, Gulval, Heamoor, Morvah, Zennor and Crowlas as well as the hamlets of Rosemergy, Treen, Mulfra, Tregavarah, Vellanoweth, Trevarrack, Trevowhan, Little Bosullow and Great Bosullow.

== Councillors ==
Election	Member	Party
2021	Andrew George	Liberal Democrat
2025	Juliet Line	Liberal Democrat

== Election results ==
=== 2025 election ===
After winning the seat of St Ives in the 2025 general election, Andrew George announced he would not stand in the 2025 Cornwall Council elections.

2025 election: Ludgvan, Madron, Gulval and Heamoor
Party	Candidate	Votes	%	±%
Liberal Democrats	Juliet Line	928	36.3	▼19.2
Independent	Hugh Eddy	826	32.3	New
Reform UK	Giane Mortimer	651	25.4	New
Conservative	Alison Thomas	143	5.6	▼27.1
Majority		102	4.0	▼18.8
Rejected ballots		10	3.9	▼4.0
Turnout		2,558	47.5	
Registered electors		5,390		
Liberal Democrats hold				

=== 2021 election ===
2021 election: Ludgvan, Madron, Gulval and Heamoor
Party	Candidate	Votes	%	±%
Liberal Democrats	Andrew George	1,483	55.5	N/A
Conservative	Simon Elliott	873	32.7	N/A
Green	Mark Russell	224	8.4	N/A
Liberal	Paul Nicholson	69	2.6	N/A
Majority		610	22.8	N/A
Rejected ballots		21	7.9	N/A
Turnout		2670		
Liberal Democrats win (new seat)				
