= Carne =

Carne or Carné is a surname (occasionally a given name), and may refer to

Given name

- Carne Ross, British diplomat

Surname

- Sir Edward Carne (c.1500–61), Welsh scholar, diplomat, English M.P.
- Elizabeth Catherine Thomas Carne (1817–73), English author & natural philosopher
- Harriet Carne (1831–1931), Cornish-born Canadian businesswoman, centenarian
- James Carne (1906–86), English Army officer
- Jean Carn(e) (born 1947), US singer
- John Carne (1789–1844), English traveller & author
- Joseph Carne (1782–1852), English geologist & industrialist
- Joseph Edmund Carne (1855–1922), Australian geologist
- Judy Carne (1939–2015), English actor
- Marcel Carné (1906–96), French film director
- Marcelo Carné (born 1991), Brazilian footballer
- Marine de Carné de Trécesson de Coëtlogon (b. fl.1985), French diplomat
- Rafael Saborido Carné, or Rafael Saborido i Carné (1927–2008), Spanish chess player
- Stuart Carne (born 1926), English doctor
- Warren Carne (born 1975), Zimbabwean mountain-biker
- Willie Carne (born 1969), Australian rugby league footballer

== See also ==
- Carne, Cornwall, a settlement
- Carne, Phoenicia, an ancient Phoenician city
- Carne asada, chili con carne and other phrases from carne meaning meat in Spanish, Portuguese, Italian, Romanian
- Carnes
- Carney (disambiguation)
- Calne
- Carne, a 1968 film directed by Armando Bó starring Isabel Sarli
- Carne, a 1991 film directed by Gaspar Noé
