= Gulval and Heamoor (electoral division) =

Former electoral division of Cornwall in the UK

- Former ward Cornwall Council
- Boundary of Gulval and Heamoor in Cornwall from 2013-2021.
- County: Cornwall

2013–2021
- Number of councillors: One
- Replaced by: Ludgvan, Madron, Gulval and Heamoor; Penzance East
- Created from: Gulval and Heamoor

2009–2013
- Number of councillors: One
- Replaced by: Gulval and Heamoor
- Created from: Council created

Gulval and Heamoor (Cornish: Lannystli ha'n Hay) was an electoral division of Cornwall in the United Kingdom which returned one member to sit on Cornwall Council between 2009 and 2021. It was abolished at the 2021 local elections, being succeeded by Ludgvan, Madron, Gulval and Heamoor and Penzance East.

== Councillors ==
Election	Member	Party
2009	Mario Fonk	Liberal Democrats
2013	Mario Fonk	Liberal Democrats
2017	Mario Fonk	Liberal Democrats
2021	Seat abolished	

== Extent ==
Gulval and Heamoor represented the villages of Heamoor and Gulval and the hamlets of Trythogga, Chyandour and Trevarrack. The division was nominally abolished during boundary changes at the 2013 election, but this had little effect on the ward. Both before and after the boundary changes, the division covered 390 hectares in total.

== Election results ==
=== 2017 election ===
2017 election: Gulval and Heamoor
Party	Candidate	Votes	%	±%
Liberal Democrats	Mario Fonk	961	63.6	
Conservative	Simon Jones	326	21.6	
Labour	Alana Bates	218	14.4	
Majority		635	42.0	
Rejected ballots		7	0.5	
Turnout		1512	45.5	
Liberal Democrats hold		Swing		

=== 2013 election ===
2013 election: Gulval and Heamoor
Party	Candidate	Votes	%	±%
Liberal Democrats	Mario Fonk	889	66.2	
UKIP	Rose Smith	317	23.6	
Conservative	Pamela Yeates	130	9.7	
Majority		572	42.6	
Rejected ballots		7	0.5	
Turnout		1343	39.1	
Liberal Democrats hold		Swing		

=== 2009 election ===
2009 election: Gulval and Heamoor
Party	Candidate	Votes	%	±%
Liberal Democrats	Mario Fonk	811	54.5	
Conservative	Pamela Yeates	233	15.7	
UKIP	Rose Smith	143	9.6	
Mebyon Kernow	Phillip Rendle	125	8.4	
Green	Lesley Bradley-Peer	82	5.5	
Labour	Juliet Eavis	57	3.8	
Independent	Joseph McKenna	26	1.7	
Majority		578	38.8	
Rejected ballots		11	0.7	
Turnout		1488	43.1	
Liberal Democrats win (new seat)				
