= Penzance East (electoral division) =

Electoral division of Cornwall in the UK

- ward Cornwall Council
- Boundary of Penzance East in Cornwall from 2021.
- County: Cornwall

Current ward
- Created: 2021
- Councillor: Tim Dwelly (Independent)
- Created from: Penzance East; Penzance Central; Gulval and Heamoor

2013–2021
- Number of councillors: One
- Replaced by: Penzance East
- Created from: Penzance East

2009–2013
- Number of councillors: One
- Replaced by: Penzance East
- Created from: Council established

Penzance East (Cornish: Pennsans Est) is an electoral division of Cornwall in the United Kingdom and returns one member to sit on Cornwall Council. The current Councillor is Tim Dwelly, an Independent and former Portfolio Holder for Culture, Economy and Planning on the council.

== Councillors ==
=== 2009-2021 ===
Election	Member	Party
2009	Ruth Lewarne	Liberal Democrat
2013	Tim Dwelly	Labour
2017	Tim Dwelly	Labour
March 2018	Tim Dwelly	Independent
2021	Seat abolished	

=== 2021-present ===
Election	Member	Party
2021	Tim Dwelly	Independent

== Extent ==
=== 2009-2021 ===
Under its former boundaries, Penzance East represented the north and east of the town of Penzance, including the area of Treneere. The ward was affected by redistricting at the 2013 election. From 2009 to 2013, the division covered 66.9 hectares in total; from 2013 to 2021 it covered 67.3 hectares.

=== 2021-present ===
With its current boundaries, the division represents the north and east of the town of Penzance, including the areas of Treneere, Causewayhead and Chyandour.

== Election results ==
=== 2021 election ===
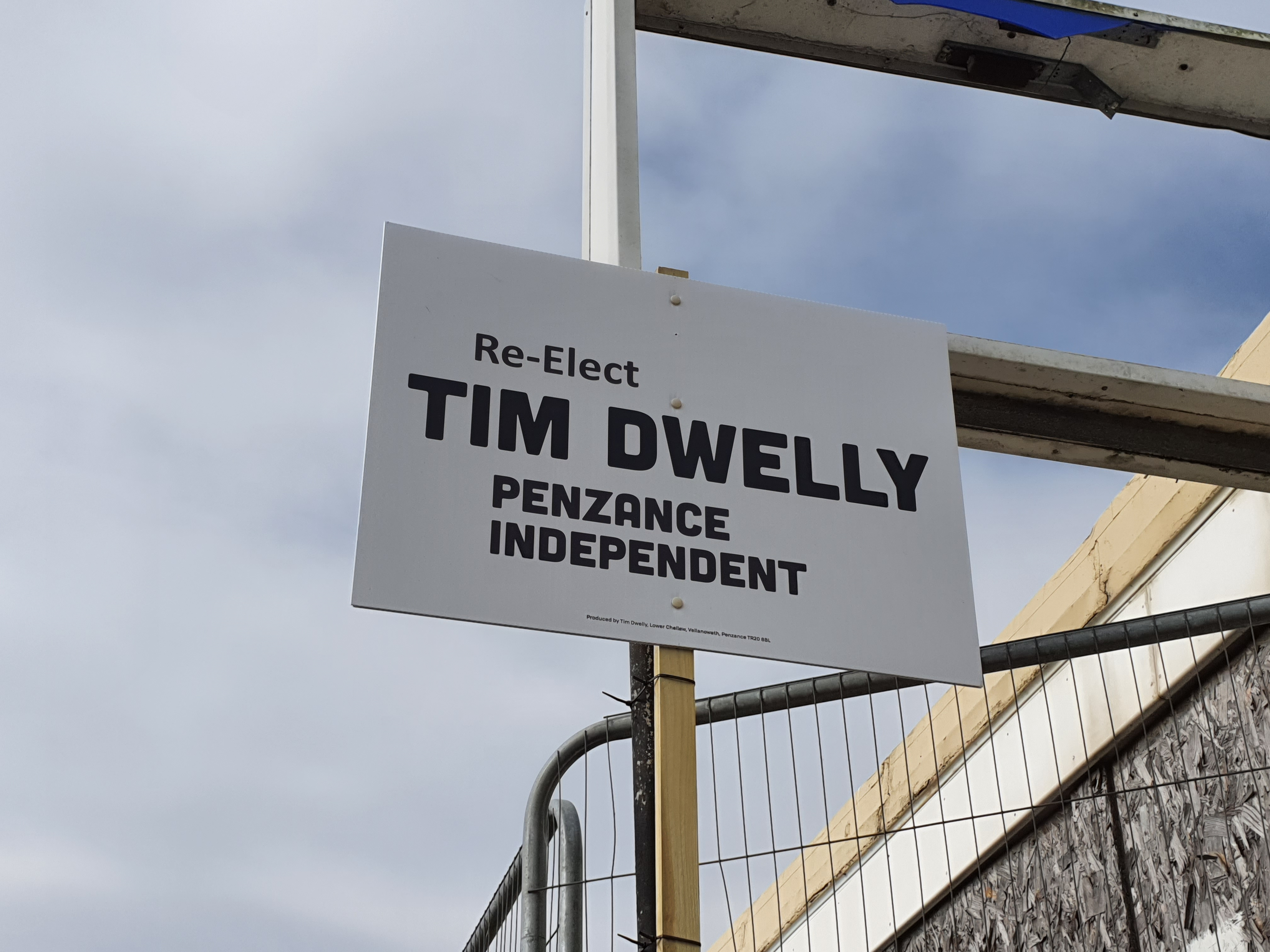
Election placard for Tim Dwelly in Penzance before the 2021 election

2021 election: Penzance East
Party	Candidate	Votes	%	±%
Independent	Tim Dwelly	786	41.2	
Labour	Cornelius Olivier (Note: Olivier was an incumbent councillor for Penzance Central, which was abolished at the elections.)	480	25.2	
Conservative	Megan McClary	259	13.6	
Green	Jonathan How	163	8.5	
Liberal Democrats	Zach Lawlor	159	8.3	
Independent	Roger Driscoll	45	2.4	
Majority		306	16.0	
Rejected ballots		16	0.8	
Turnout		1908	37.6	
Registered electors		5070		
Independent win (new seat)				

=== 2017 election ===
2017 election: Penzance East
Party	Candidate	Votes	%	±%
Labour	Tim Dwelly (Note: Dwelly was elected as a Labour councillor and was Labour leader on the council, but quit in March 2018 because of 'bullying and intimidation' from the 'far left' within the party.)	761	52.1	
Liberal Democrats	Richard Goedegebuur	315	21.5	
Conservative	Joseph Bennie	193	13.2	
Green	Jonathan How	85	5.8	
UKIP	Paul Nicholson	58	4.0	
Mebyon Kernow	Robert Simmons	47	3.2	
Majority		446	30.5	
Rejected ballots		3	0.2	
Turnout		1462	45.4	
Labour hold		Swing		

=== 2013 election ===
2013 election: Penzance East
Party	Candidate	Votes	%	±%
Labour	Tim Dwelly	378	30.4	
Liberal Democrats	Ruth Lewarne	358	28.8	
UKIP	Mick Faulkner	194	15.6	
Conservative	Angela Elliott	124	10.0	
Mebyon Kernow	Rob Simmons	91	7.3	
Green	Michelle Paine	89	7.2	
Majority		20	1.6	
Rejected ballots		8	0.6	
Turnout		1242	36.2	
Labour gain from Liberal Democrats		Swing		

=== 2009 election ===
2009 election: Penzance East
Party	Candidate	Votes	%	±%
Liberal Democrats	Ruth Lewarne	357	30.1	
Labour	John Payne	332	28.0	
UKIP	Ricky Barnes	199	16.8	
Conservative	Margaret Powell	159	13.4	
Independent	Mike Waters	128	10.8	
Majority		25	2.1	
Rejected ballots		10	0.8	
Turnout		1185	34.7	
Liberal Democrats win (new seat)				
