= Carnes =

Carnes is a surname. Notable people with the surname include:

- Clarence Carnes (1927–1988), American prisoner
- Cody Carnes (born 1989), American Christian musician
- Edward Earl Carnes (born 1950), American judge
- Jill Carnes, musician and artist
- Jimmy Carnes (1934–2011), American track and field athlete, coach and administrator
- Julie E. Carnes (born 1950), American judge
- Kim Carnes (born 1945), American singer and songwriter
- Michael Carnes (born 1950), American composer
- Patrick Carnes (born 1944), American counselor
- Ryan Carnes (born 1982), American actor
- Thomas P. Carnes (1762–1822), American lawyer and politician

== See also ==
- Carnes, Iowa
- Carnes, Mississippi
- Carne
