= Coëtlogon =

Coëtlogon can refer to:

- Alain Emmanuel de Coëtlogon, Marshal of France
- Marine de Carné de Trécesson de Coëtlogon, French diplomat
- Coëtlogon, Côtes-d'Armor, a French commune
- Coëtlogon, a French Navy frigate under the command of Abel-Nicolas Bergasse du Petit-Thouars during the Boshin war in Japan.
