= Carfury Standing Stone =

- Cuckoo Rock
- Location within Southwest Cornwall
- 50.150662°N 5.584941°W
- Type: Standing stone
- Location: Carfury, Madron, Cornwall

Site notes
- Height: 10 ft (3.0 m)

Scheduled monument
- Official name: Standing stone 230m south of Primrose Cottage
- Designated: 12 June 1968
- Reference no.: 1004348

Carfury Standing Stone is a standing stone in Penwith, Cornwall, about 4 km northwest of Penzance. Also called Cuckoo Rock, the stone stands around 3m tall and is 0.7m wide by 0.4m thick.

The site was excavated between 31 December 1957 and 3 January 1958 by Peter Pool and Vivien Russell which found the stone had been erected in an elliptical pit and wedged in place using small stones. Little else was found but Russell did note a potential sister stone downhill which "would make a monument very similar to the Cuckoo Rock". The stone was designated a Scheduled Monument in June 1968.

It is within sight of Ding Dong Mine.
