= Chyandour Brook =

River in Cornwall, England

Coordinates: 50.1250°N 5.5279°W

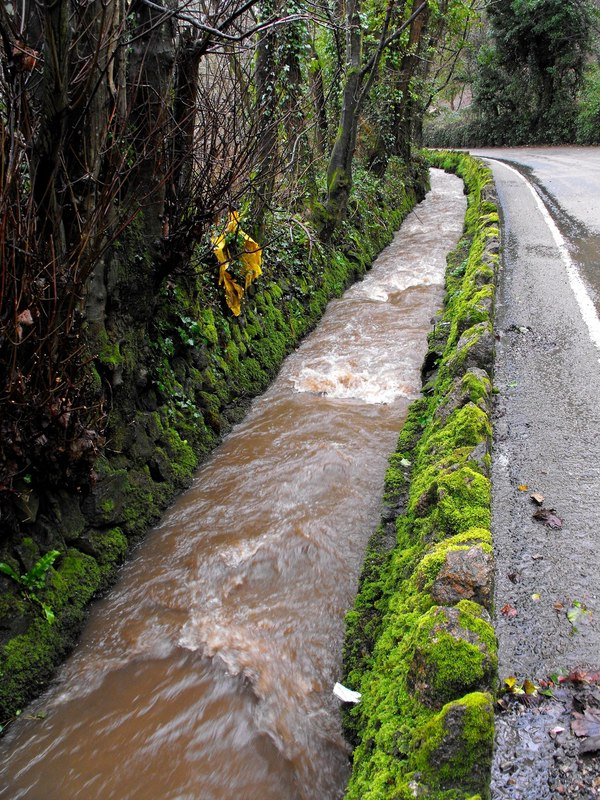
Chyandour Brook in Chyandour, Penzance, after a spell of heavy rain (2010)

Chyandour Brook is a small river (brook) in west Cornwall, England. Rising in Boskednan in the civil parish of Madron, Chyandour Brook drains into Mount's Bay in the English Channel at Chyandour, Penzance.

== Course ==
Located entirely in the west of Cornwall, Chyandour Brook rises in the Penwith Moors in Boskednan, civil parish of Madron, and flows a southeasterly course. After flowing past the village of Madron, Chyandour Brook turns east through Heamoor, in the civil parish of Penzance. It then flows through Treneere—a residential council estate—before resuming a southeasterly course into Chyandour, where it drains into Mount's Bay in the English Channel.

== Flooding ==
Chyandour Brook has overflown on several occasions, with many significant flooding incidents between 2002 and 2014. The Environment Agency, a non-departmental public body sponsored by the United Kingdom's Department for Environment, Food and Rural Affairs, declares most of the surrounding area of Chyandour Brook in Flood zone 3, indicating a "high probability of flooding."
