= John Carne =

British traveller and author

- Born: 18 June 1789; Penzance, Cornwall
- Died: 19 April 1844 (aged 54); Penzance, Cornwall
- Education: Queens' College, Cambridge
- Occupations: Traveller and author
- Spouse: Ellen Lane (m. 1824)
- Relatives: William Carne (father); Anna Cock (mother); Joseph Carne (brother) Elizabeth Carne (niece)

John Carne (1789–1844) was a British traveller and author.

== Early life and education ==
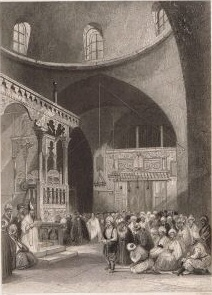
Steel line engraving prepared to accompany Carne's work Syria, The Holy Land, Asia Minor, &c. Illustrated

John Carne was born on 18 June 1789 in Penzance, Cornwall, the fourth son of five known children of Anna (née Cock) (? - 8 November 1822) and William Carne (1754-1836). The couple had married in 1780, his maternal grandfather was Francis Cock of Helston. William Carne was a merchant, mining agent, shipowner and banker at Penzance, where he died on 4 July 1836 at the age of 81. John's eldest brother was Joseph Carne FRS, a noted geologist and mineral collector, and his niece through Joseph was Elizabeth Carne (1817–1873) author, natural philosopher, geologist, conchologist, mineral collector, philanthropist and banker.

Carne was a member of Queens' College, Cambridge, at different times both before and after his journey to the East, but he never resided long enough for a degree. He was admitted in 1826 to deacon's orders by Dr Matthew Henry Thornhill Luscombe, the chaplain of the British embassy at Paris, and a bishop of the Episcopal church of Scotland; but, except during a few months' residence at Vevey in Switzerland, he did not officiate as a clergyman. However, as a younger man, living in West Cornwall and from a committed Methodist family, he had frequently preached with other local preachers at chapels in Penzance and Newlyn.

== Career ==
His father, a strict man of business aside from his active service to Wesleyan Methodism (William Carne has frequently been called 'the father of Cornish Methodism'), desired that his son should follow in his footsteps, as Joseph had done. However, after a short trial of business, during which John's literary and story-telling abilities showed themselves, his father allowed him to follow his own inclinations. His first literary production was brought out anonymously in 1820, and was called Poems containing the Indian and Lazarus.

Carne resolved to visit the holy places, and accordingly left England on 26 March 1821. He visited Constantinople, Greece, the Levant, Egypt, and Palestine. In the latter country, while returning from the convent of St Catharine, he was taken prisoner by Bedouins, but, after being detained for some days, was released in safety. On coming back to England he commenced writing for the New Monthly Magazine an account of his travels, under the title of Letters from the East, receiving from Henry Colburn twenty guineas for each article. These Letters were then reproduced in a volume, dedicated to Sir Walter Scott, which went to a third edition. This book is noticeable for the fact that there is not a single date to be found in it except that on the title-page. The publication of this work and his talents for society brought him into familiar intercourse with Walter Scott, Southey, Campbell, Lockhart, Jerdan, and other distinguished men of letters.

He next published Tales of the West, 1828, 2 vols., treating of his native county. Among those who knew him his fame as a story-teller far exceeded his renown as a writer, and social company often gathered round him to be spellbound by some exciting or pathetic narration. During the latter part of his life he resided chiefly in Penzance. Oppressed by the infirmities of a premature old age, he had ceased for some years before his death to engage in any literary pursuits. While preparing to set out for the shores of the Mediterranean he was attacked with a sudden illness and died at Penzance on 19 April 1844, when his remains were buried in Gulval churchyard.

== Works ==
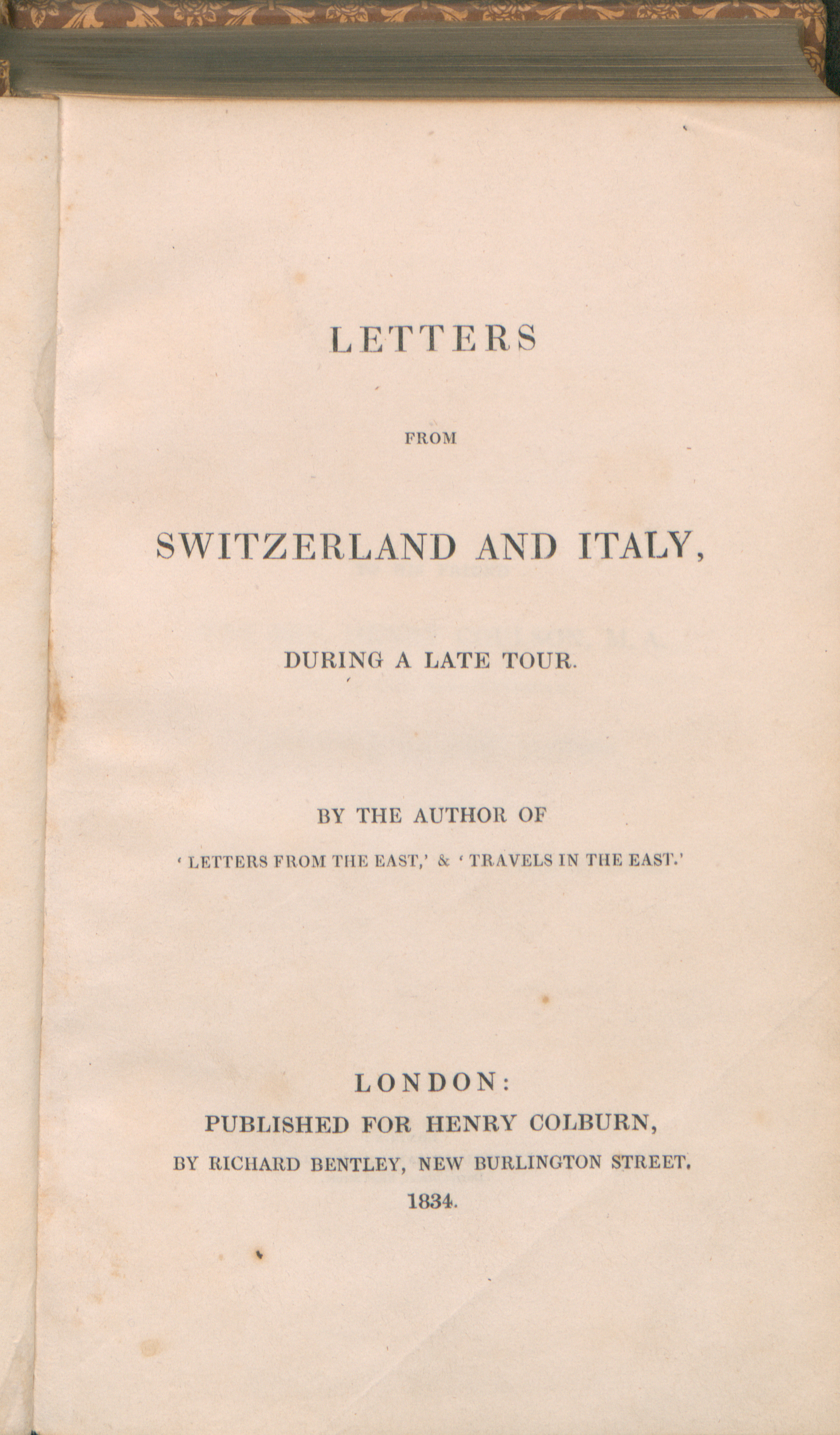
Letters from Switzerland and Italy, 1834

Besides the works already mentioned, Carne was the author of:

- Letters from the East 1826, London, Henry Colburn
- Stratton Hill, a Tale of the Civil War 1829, 3 vols
- Recollections of Travels in the East 1830
- The Exiles of Palestine, a Tale of the Holy Land 1831, 3 vols
- Lives of Eminent Missionaries 1833, 3 vols
- Letters from Switzerland and Italy 1834, London, Colburn and Bentley
- Syria, the Holy Land, Asia Minor 1836-1838 (illustrated by W.H. Bartlett, William Purser), 3 vols.
- Lives of Eminent Missionaries 1844
- Lives of Eminent Missionaries 1852, 3 vols

The term motley crew may have gained family from Recollections of Travels in the East: "Away they marched from the rocky region and miserable village where they were posted, a motley crew of Christians and Infidels, Catholics, Greeks, and adorers of the Prophet, all mingled together, to go and attack the holy city."

He was also a writer in the New Monthly Magazine, the Forget-me-not, the Gem, the Keepsake, and other works.

== Family ==
At the age of 25, in 1824, he married Ellen, daughter of Mr Lane, a drawing-master of Worcester. Her brother Theodore Lane, an artist and exhibitioner at the Royal Academy, died after falling through a skylight at the horse bazaar in Gray's Inn Lane on 21 May 1828, when his daughter Emma was adopted by her uncle. Mrs Carne married, secondly, Henry Harrington Clay, and died at Penzance on 2 February 1868, aged 67.
