= Trythogga =

Hamlet in Cornwall, England

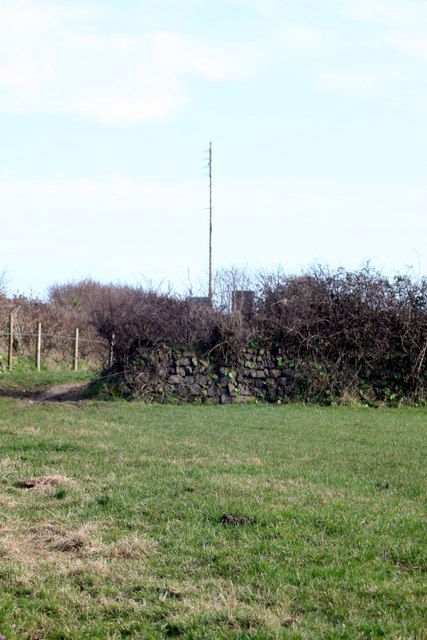
Communications mast above Trythogga

Trythogga is a hamlet west of Gulval in west Cornwall, England, United Kingdom.
