= Joseph Carne =

British geologist and industrialist

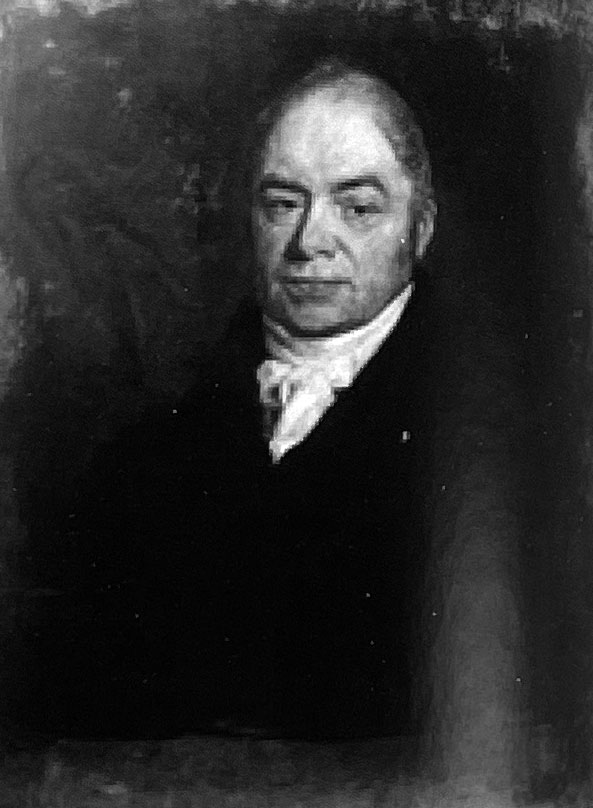
- Portrait attributed to William Owen (painter)
- Born: 17 April 1782; Penzance, Cornwall, United Kingdom
- Died: 12 October 1858 (aged 76)
- Occupations: Geologist, Industrialist and Banker
- Known for: Contributions to geology and mineralogy
- Spouse: Mary Thomas
- Children: Eight children, including Elizabeth Catherine Thomas Carne

Joseph Carne FRS, FGS (17 April 1782 – 12 October 1858) was a Cornish geologist, industrialist and banker.

== Early life ==
Carne was born at Penzance, Cornwall, United Kingdom, the eldest son of William Carne, a banker, and his wife Anna Carne née Cock of Helston. He was educated at home and at the Wesleyan school, Keynsham, near Bristol. One of his four younger brothers was the author and traveller John Carne. From an early age Carne showed an interest in mineralogy and geology. He was in the habit of walking round to the copper mines, and collecting specimens of the rarer ores, which the miners were glad to sell at low prices, thereby forming the nucleus of his mineralogical collection.

On 23 March 1808 he married Mary Thomas, the daughter of William Thomas of Kidwelly, MD, physician at Haverfordwest. After his marriage he lived for a short time at Penzance, and in 1808 he removed to Rivière House, Phillack on being appointed manager of the Cornish Copper Company's smelting works at Hayle. His good business habits and quickness at figures well fitted him for this situation. Seven of his eight children (two boys and five girls) were born at Rivière House, before he resigned his role as manager (remaining an investor like his father) and returned to Penzance, living in Chapel House from 1820. His youngest son was born and died in their home in Chapel Street, Penzance.

== Career ==
Carne was a close observer, and paid special attention to the granitic veins of St Michael's Mount, and the vein-like lines of porphyritic rocks provincially termed elvans. In 1816 and 1818 Carne communicated to the Royal Geological Society of Cornwall his investigation On Elvan Courses, in which he established their general characters and fixed the probable dates of their intrusion into the granite masses and the clay-slates. The Granite of the Western part of Cornwall and the Geology of the Scilly Isles were additional communications made to the local geological society.

After studying the formation of mineral veins, in 1818 he sent a paper to the Geological Society of Cornwall entitled On the relative Age of the Veins of Cornwall. This inquiry led, some years after, to the formation of a fund by subscription, which enabled William Jory Henwood to devote all his leisure, for many years, to personal observations in every mining field in Cornwall. These inquiries led to Carne being elected a Fellow of the Royal Society on 28 May 1818. In 1821 he published his paper On the Mineral Productions and the Geology of the Parish of St. Just.

This work led to the collection of Cornish minerals, which he left in his Will to the care of his daughter Elizabeth Carne, who added both local material and specimens from her travels and installed it in a dedicated museum in Penzance. After her death in 1873, they became part of the family estate in the possession of Charles Campbell Ross, formerly MP for St. Ives. The Carne Mineral Collection, of 8,000 specimens, was purchased for Cambridge University, by a coalition of sponsors and patrons keen to see it preserved, from the bankruptcy sale of the Carne bank's assets in 1898. The Carne Collection forms part of the large geological collections exhibited in the Sedgwick Museum of Earth Sciences, Cambridge.

Carne's paper On the Pseudo-morphous Minerals of Cornwall was calculated to throw light on the mysterious changes which occur in minerals. In connection with this subject Carne also examined most of the varieties of tin ore which have been found in veins, and such as are peculiar to the deposits in stream works. In 1846 a paper was read by Carne On the Remains of a Submarine Forest in the North-eastern part of the Mount's Bay, and in 1851 Notice of a Raised Beach lately discovered in Zennor will be found in the pages of the Transactions of the Cornwall Geological Society, vol. vii.

Carne also wrote on the history of copper mining, and on the improvements made in its metallurgy—on the discovery of ancient coins—on the formation of the blown sands of the north coasts of the county, and contributed a paper to the Statistical Society of London entitled Statistics of the Tin Mines in Cornwall and of the Consumption of Tin in Great Britain.

Carne was an honorary member of the Cambridge Philosophical Society. In 1837 he was picked for Sheriff of Cornwall but did not accept the appointment. For many years he was the treasurer of the Royal Geological Society of Cornwall and due to his extensive knowledge of the laws of mines and minerals, and his intimate acquaintance with local usages, he was referred to in most cases of difficulty.

== Later life ==
The Wesleyan chapels of West Cornwall sought Carne's assistance and advice. He took charge of Sunday schools, and kept a large stock of books for the teachers. In 1820 Carne left Hayle, and went to Penzance to become a partner in his father's bank (Batten, Carne, & Carne).

He died at Penzance on 12 October 1858.

His daughter, Elizabeth Catherine Thomas Carne was also a noted geologist. Upon Joseph's death his large mineral collection became her responsibility and she continued to collect specimens and created a private museum. She also assumed his place as Managing Partner of the family bank, until her own demise in 1873.
