= Dudley Savage =

British organist (1920–2008)

William Dudley Savage MBE (20 March 1920 – 25 November 2008) was a British organist and broadcaster who for many years broadcast a hospital request programme from the Royal (ABC) cinema in Plymouth. He both introduced and played requests on the Royal organ. When it was axed, the resultant petition was said at the time to be the largest the BBC had ever encountered.

== Early life ==
Savage was born on 20 March 1920 near Penzance, in the village of Gulval. His mother played the organ there in the village church and taught him in their home how to play the piano. He moved on to study the organ under the instruction of organists at Truro Cathedral and with other instructors in Cornwall and Plymouth.

== Theatre organist and soldier ==
In 1938, as an 18-year-old, he was chosen as the organist for the ABC Royal Cinema in Plymouth which had been constructed that year and included a Compton theatre organ with eight ranks of pipes plus a Compton Melotone unit. With a break for military service, he remained at the ABC organ until the cinema was converted into a bingo hall in 1976.

During World War II, Savage was called up for military service in 1940, serving in India. He was a lance bombardier prior to being commissioned as a second lieutenant on 12 August 1943, later rising to the rank of captain. After his discharge from military service in 1946, he returned to his position at Royal Cinema.

== As Prescribed on BBC Radio ==
His hospital request radio programme As Prescribed started in June 1948 as a weekly broadcast from ABC's Royal Cinema in Plymouth. Savage not only presented the hour-long show, but played requests on the organ from listeners who were sick in hospital or housebound. After the BBC cancelled the show following the 22 September 1968 broadcast, more than 43,000 signatures were collected on a petition submitted to the BBC, in addition to letters sent to the Chairman of Governors of the BBC and the Archbishop of Canterbury. The petition was submitted, accompanied by protesters carrying banners in what was described as "perhaps the biggest demonstration of its kind the BBC has known". After a brief hiatus, the BBC reinstated it as a monthly show in 1969, continuing As Prescribed for another decade, and later moving the programme to Radio 2.

In 1968 BBC Records and Tapes issued an album of Savage performing favourites from As Prescribed at the Plymouth Theatre organ, including his own medleys of the songs of Ivor Novello, and his arrangement of the theme from the 1952 film Moulin Rouge.

== Death and eulogies ==
He went on concert tours throughout the UK and Europe, displaying for his audiences what author and organist Jonathan Mann described as "an incredibly distinctive style with a particular gift for harmony." He was appointed a Member of the Order of the British Empire (MBE) in the 1978 Queen's Birthday Honours.

Savage died at age 88 on 25 November 2008 at a nursing home near Liskeard after a long illness. In response to his death in 2008, the Cinema Organ Society eulogised Savage as someone who had "delighted organ fans up and down the country as well as in Europe" and as "one of the last surviving organists from the great days when cinema organs were to be heard constantly on the wireless".
