= Derek Thomas (politician) =

British politician

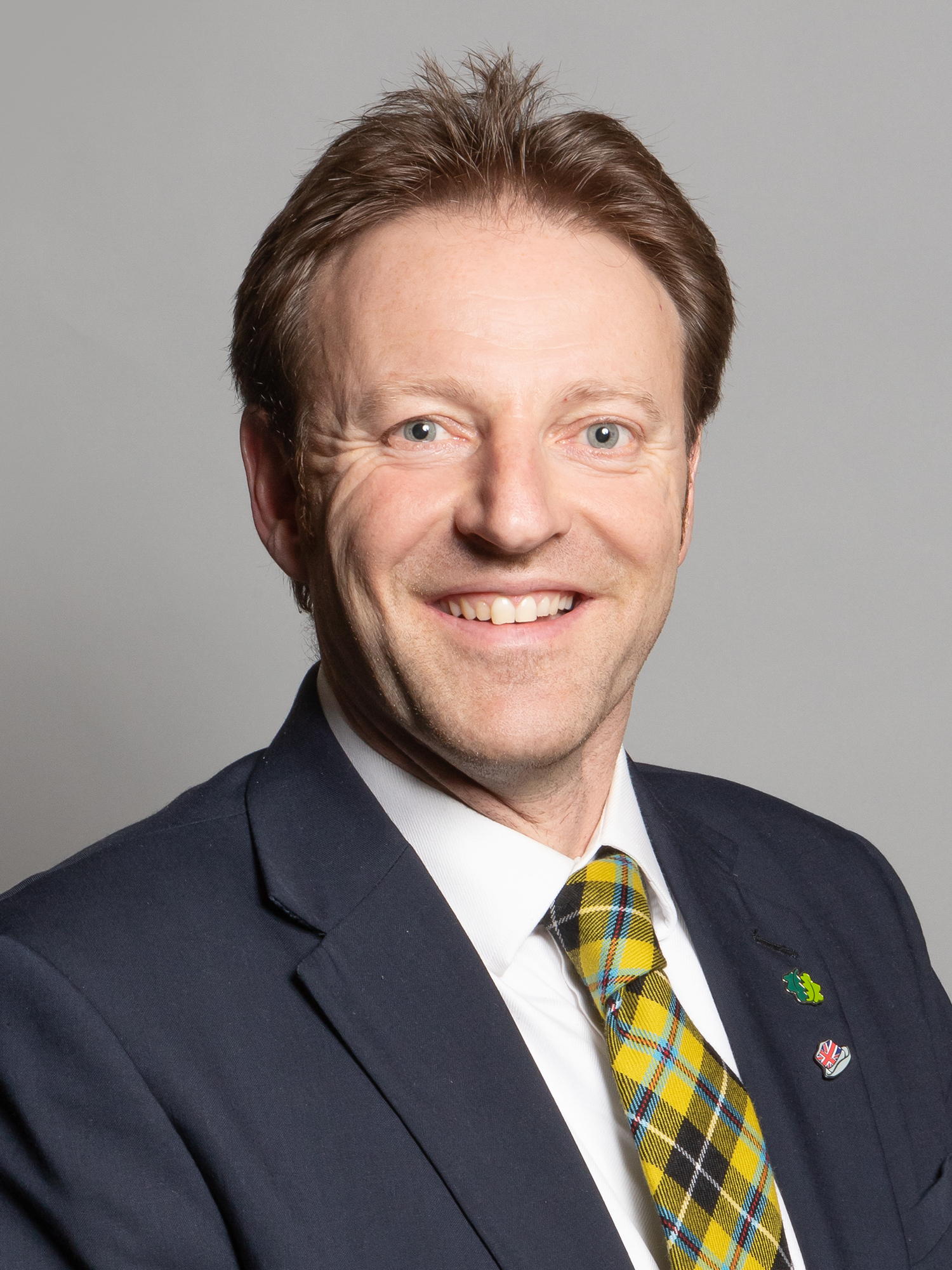

Member of Parliament for St Ives
- In office 7 May 2015 – 30 May 2024
- Preceded by: Andrew George
- Succeeded by: Andrew George

Personal details
- Born: 20 July 1972 (age 53) Cornwall, England
- Party: Conservative
- Website: https://www.derekthomas.org/

Derek Gordon Thomas (born 20 July 1972) is a British Conservative politician and former property developer who served as the Member of Parliament (MP) for St Ives from 2015 until the 2024 general election.

== Early life and career ==
Derek Thomas was born on 20 July 1972 in Cornwall to parents who were evangelical missionaries. He grew up in West Cornwall and went on to complete a traditional Cornish Mason Apprenticeship.

He then worked in South London, before returning to West Cornwall to be a development manager for Mustard Seed, a voluntary organisation in Helston which helps in meeting of the needs of adults with learning disabilities on a day care basis, through provision of training in essential life skills with a view to greater integration within the community. He later started his own small construction business as a property developer.

== Political career ==
Thomas was first elected as a candidate for the Conservative Party at a by-election in November 2005 for Penzance Central ward on Penwith District Council. He narrowly beat the Liberal Democrat candidate and subsequently opposed the creation of a unitary Cornwall Council. In May 2009, he did not stand for the new Penzance Central ward on the amalgamated Cornwall Council and the seat was narrowly won by the Liberal Democrat candidate.

At the 2010 general election, Thomas stood as the Conservative candidate in St Ives, coming second with 39% of the vote behind the incumbent Liberal Democrat MP Andrew George.

== Parliamentary career ==
Thomas was elected to Parliament as MP for St Ives at the 2015 general election with 38.3% of the vote and a majority of 2,469.

He supported the Leave campaign in the 2016 Brexit referendum.

At the snap 2017 general election, Thomas was re-elected as MP for St Ives with an increased vote share of 43.2% and a decreased majority of 312.

In April 2019, Thomas was criticised for stating untruthfully that Cornwall has a National Park on the Lizard Peninsula during a debate he secured to discuss 'Effect of the 25 Year Environment Plan on World Health', when in fact the area is a National Nature Reserve and an Area of Outstanding Natural Beauty. Despite this error the debate was positively received by MPs and led to Thomas being invited to apply to the Environmental Audit Committee by its Chair Mary Creagh.

In May 2019, Cornish MPs received local scrutiny following release of expenses figures for that year, Thomas claimed £184,937, therefore making him Cornwall's "second most expensive MP" after Steve Double. Thomas said: "Having run my own business before being elected an MP, I am acutely aware of the need to keep a close eye on what is being spent. I constantly look at ways of reducing my expenses but believe my claims are very reasonable for an MP representing a constituency in the extreme south west of the country”.

In June 2019, Thomas supported the establishment of a Marine Conservation Zone west of Land's End, calling the move a "big step forward".

In the House of Commons, he sits on the Environmental Audit Committee and the Work and Pensions Select Committee having previously sat on both the Health and Social Care Select Committee and the Science and technology Select Committees.

Thomas is currently the Chair of the following All-Party Parliamentary Groups: Brain Tumours, Vascular and Venous Disease, and Axial spondyloarthritis. As well as chairing those APPGs, Thomas is Vice Chair for the following APPG groups: Post Office Group, UK Islands Group and Home Electrical Safety Group (Vice Chair and Secretary). He is Secretary for the Healthy Homes and Buildings Group, and Treasurer for the Fuel Poverty and Energy Efficiency Group and also the South West Rail Group. He is a member of the Ocean Conservation Group, The Minimum Unit Pricing of Alcohol Group and the Great South West Alliance group.

At the 2019 general election, Thomas was again re-elected, with an increased vote share of 49.3% and an increased majority of 4,280.

He backed Penny Mordaunt in the leadership contests in 2022.

== Personal life ==
Thomas lives in West Cornwall in the village of St Buryan with his wife Tamsin and their three young children.

Parliament of the United Kingdom
Preceded by Andrew George	Member of Parliament for St Ives; 2015–2024	Succeeded by Andrew George
