= Andrew George (politician) =

British politician (born 1958)

Andrew George MP
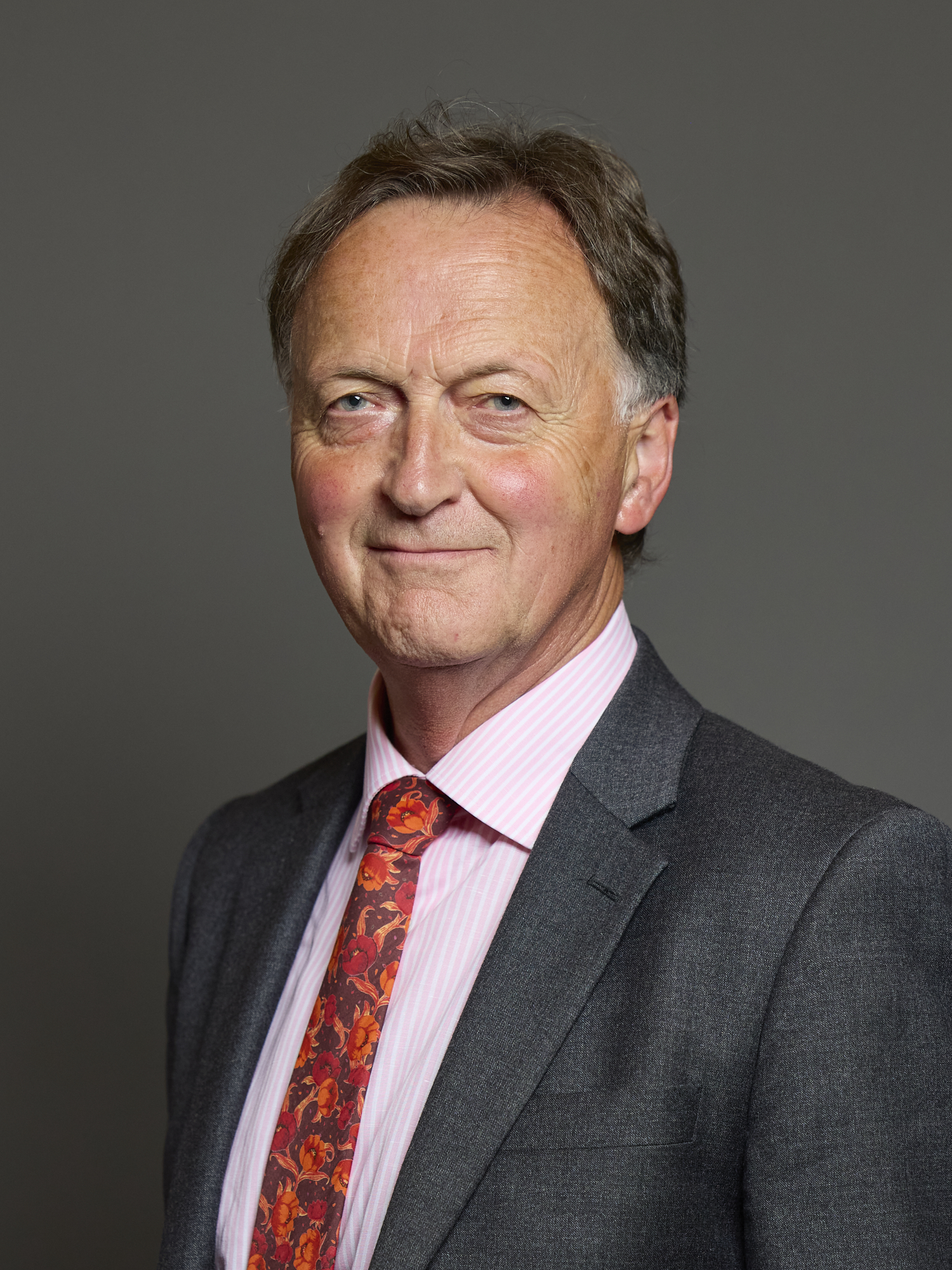
- Official portrait, 2024

Member of Parliament for St Ives
- Incumbent
- Assumed office 4 July 2024
- Preceded by: Derek Thomas
- Majority: 13,786 (28.6%)
- In office 1 May 1997 – 30 March 2015
- Preceded by: David Harris
- Succeeded by: Derek Thomas

Liberal Democrat Spokesperson for International Development
- In office 16 May 2005 – 8 March 2006
- Leader: Charles Kennedy; Menzies Campbell
- Preceded by: Tom Brake
- Succeeded by: Lynne Featherstone

Member of Cornwall Council for Ludgvan, Madron, Gulval and Heamoor
- In office 10 May 2021 – 1 May 2025
- Preceded by: Division established
- Succeeded by: Juliet Line

Personal details
- Born: 2 December 1958 (age 67) Mullion, Cornwall, England
- Party: Liberal Democrat
- Other political affiliations: Mebyon Kernow
- Spouse: Jill Marshall (m. 1987)
- Children: 2
- Education: University of Sussex (BA); University College, Oxford (MSc)

Andrew Henry George (born 2 December 1958) is an English and Cornish Liberal Democrat politician. He has been Member of Parliament (MP) for St Ives in Cornwall since 2024, previously representing the constituency from 1997 to 2015, when he was defeated by the Conservatives' Derek Thomas. He was the vice-chairman of the All Party Parliamentary Housing and Planning Group in the 2010 parliament. George has served as a member of Cornwall Council for Ludgvan, Madron, Gulval and Heamoor, having been elected in the 2021 council election.

== Early life ==
Andrew Henry George was born on 2 December 1958 in the village of Mullion near The Lizard, on the southwest coast of Cornwall, one of eight children born to horticulturist Reginald Hugh George and music teacher Diana May George (née Petherick).

== Education ==
George was educated locally at Helston Grammar School, in the town of Helston in Cornwall, before attending the University of Sussex where he received a Bachelor of Arts (BA) degree in cultural and community studies in 1980. He finished his education at University College at the University of Oxford, where he was awarded a Master of Science (MSc) degree in agricultural economics in 1981.

== Life and career ==
George worked as a charity worker, initially, as a rural officer with the Nottinghamshire Rural Community Council in 1981, and held a number of appointments in charity, business and research, until he became the deputy director of the Cornwall Rural Community Council in 1987, where he remained until his election to the House of Commons. Before joining the Liberal Democrats he was a member of Mebyon Kernow, and was one of the founder members of the Cornish Constitutional Convention, campaigning for a Cornish Assembly.

He contested the seat of St Ives at the 1992 general election where he finished second, just 1,645 votes behind the sitting Conservative MP David Harris. Harris stood down at the 1997 general election and George won the seat with a majority of 7,170 and remained as the MP there until 2015. He made his maiden speech on 22 May 1997.

=== First Stint at Parliament ===
In the House of Commons, George led the Liberal Democrats' Parliamentary DEFRA and Environment team as LibDem Spokesman for agriculture. He rebelled against the Conservative/Liberal Democrat coalition government more than any other Liberal Democrat MP.

George was made the Liberal Democrats' Fisheries Spokesman by Paddy Ashdown in 1997, a role he undertook until 2007. Under the new leadership of Charles Kennedy in 1999 he also became Disability spokesperson as part of the Department of Social Security team. Following the 2001 General Election he became parliamentary private secretary to Kennedy. He became Rural Affairs and Food spokesperson in 2002, a role he held until 2005. He was International Development spokesperson from the 2005 general election until 2006.

On 6 January 2006, George was one of the first members of the Liberal Democrat frontbench team to threaten to resign his post if Charles Kennedy had not stood down as leader by 9 January 2006. He was replaced on the front bench on 8 March by Kennedy's successor, Sir Menzies Campbell.

George suffers from the autoimmune disease Ankylosing spondylitis and has campaigned for a TNF inhibitor drug treatment to be made available to all patients. He is a member of the National Ankylosing Spondylitis Society's experts panel.

In the 2010 general election, George's majority was substantially reduced from 11,609 to 1,719 following boundary changes to his constituency.

In 2011–2012, George was a leading figure of a LibDem rebellion against the Cameron–Clegg government's proposed Health and Social Care Bill 2011, describing it as "a missed opportunity to reform health and social care" and a violation of the coalition agreement. The rebellion saw dozens of LibDems voting against the bill alongside Labour. Despite this, the bill passed 314–260.

During the so-called "Bonfire of the quangos" by the government, in 2013 George opposed plans to abolish the Agricultural Wages Board, the governmental body which had been responsible for regulating farm workers' wages, on the grounds that it could harm the pay and conditions of farmers.

==== Cornish issues ====
From his election victory in 1997, George has campaigned in Parliament on many issues key to Cornwall. An early success was the campaign to win millions of pounds of European economic aid for Cornwall from the Objective One funding programme, for which he chaired the All Party Parliamentary Objective One Group.

On 12 May 2005, George became the first MP to swear his oath of allegiance to the Queen in Cornish after a long campaign for the language's official recognition. George also claims to have been the first MP to use Cornish in his maiden speech back in 1997.

In 2007, George voted in Parliament against Cornwall becoming a unitary authority. Local polls commissioned by Penwith District Council indicated that almost 90% of the public were opposed to the formation of the Cornish unitary authority.

==== Opposition to bedroom tax ====
George sponsored a Private Member's Bill, the Affordable Homes Bill, to limit the application of the "bedroom tax" benefit cut only to tenants that had rejected a "reasonable offer" of alternative accommodation with the correct number of bedrooms. The bill reached the second reading stage after the Government was defeated in a vote in the House of Commons, but failed to proceed further because the Government did not supply a Money Resolution. George opposed the "bedroom tax" in earlier votes, saying that those who supported it "should come down to meet some of my constituents who are affected by it and look them in the eye as they attempt to justify it".

=== On Cornwall Council ===
In March 2021, it was reported that George was standing for election to Cornwall Council in the 2021 local elections. At the elections, George won the seat of Ludgvan, Madron, Gulval and Heamoor with 56% of the vote, beating a Conservative incumbent.

=== Second Stint at Parliament ===
In February 2022 it was announced that George would once again be standing as the Liberal Democrats' candidate for the St Ives constituency at the next general election. He defeated the incumbent Derek Thomas, winning with 52% of the votes. After being elected to Parliament, George announced in August 2024 that he would stand down at the 2025 local council elections.

Since 2024, George has served as a member of the Health and Social Care Select Committee.

== Personal life ==
George married Jill Elizabeth Marshall in 1987. They have a son and a daughter together.

== Publications ==
- The Natives are Revolting Down in the Cornwall Theme Park by Andrew George, 1986
- Cornwall at the Crossroads by Bernard Deacon, Andrew George et al., 1989 CoSERG, Redruth ISBN 0-9513918-0-1
- A Vision of Cornwall by Andrew George, 1995
- A View from the Bottom Left-Hand Corner by Andrew George, 2002, Patten Press, Penzance ISBN 1-872229-40-9

== See also ==
- List of topics related to Cornwall

Parliament of the United Kingdom
Preceded by David Harris	Member of Parliament for St Ives; 1997–2015	Succeeded by Derek Thomas
Preceded by Derek Thomas	Member of Parliament for St Ives; 2024–present	Incumbent
