= Elizabeth Carne =

English geologist and writer

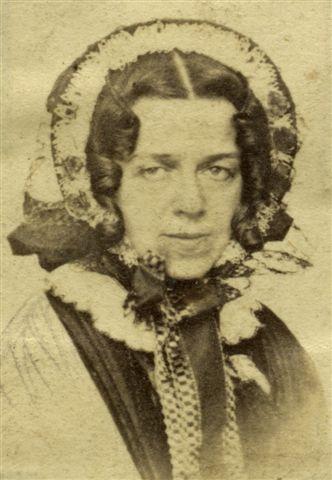
- Born: Elizabeth Catherine Thomas Carne; 16 December 1817; Rivière House, Phillack, Cornwall, England
- Died: 7 September 1873 (aged 55); Penzance, Cornwall, England
- Other name: John Altrayd Wittitterly
- Known for: Geology, First female member of the Royal Geological Society of Cornwall

Elizabeth Catherine Thomas Carne (1817–1873) was a British writer, natural philosopher, geologist, conchologist, mineral collector, and philanthropist. In later years, following her father's death, she also became a banker.

== Personal life ==
Elizabeth Carne was the fifth of six children born to Joseph Carne, FRS, and his wife Mary Thomas of Glamorgan. Elizabeth was born at Rivière House, in the parish of Phillack, near Hayle, Cornwall, in 1817 and baptised in Phillack church on 15 May 1820. At Rivière House, owned by the Cornish Copper Company of which her father was the Company Director, the cellars were fitted out as laboratories where smelting processes of copper and tin were tested, and minerals and rocks studied for their constituents. Before she was born, Davies Gilbert FRS had brought a young Humphry Davy to the laboratory to view the workings of a scientific environment.

Carne was born into an influential and wealthy Methodist family of mining agents and merchants, but was acutely aware of the poverty and deprivation in the surrounding mining areas, and the need for education and support for those less fortunate. She read widely, studied mathematics, the classics, and learned several languages. Both her paternal grandfather, William Carne, sometimes styled 'the Father of Cornish Methodism', and her father were active Wesleyan Methodist class leaders within the Church of England, and the local Methodist book room was lodged in their home. Carne was educated at home in Chapel Street, Penzance, with her sisters, and she assisted her father with his extensive mineral collections and shared his keen interest in geological formations and materials. A close friend, with whom she regularly corresponded, was the Quaker diarist, Caroline Fox of Falmouth's shipping and mining family.

== Charitable works ==
After her father's death in 1858, Carne came into a large fortune. She used this legacy, following the charitable habits of her parents, for educational and other philanthropic purposes. She gave the site for St Paul's school which opened, after her death, at Penzance on 2 February 1876. She also founded schools at Wesley Rock (Heamoor), Carfury, and Bosullow, three rural districts near Penzance. She donated the purchase price for the land upon which St John's Hall (the town hall) was constructed, and built a museum on Lower Queen's Street near her home, to exhibit the fine collection of minerals which she had helped her father collect.

== Geologist and author ==
In 1858, she took up her father's partnership as head of the Penzance Bank, which had been founded by her grandfather, William Carne, in 1795 (Batten, Carne and Oxnam). She retained her father's love of geology, and wrote four papers in the 'Transactions of the Royal Geological Society of Cornwall: 'Cliff Boulders and the Former Condition of the Land and Sea in the Land's End district'; 'The Age of the Maritime Alps surrounding Mentone'; 'On the Transition and Metamorphosis of Rocks' and 'On the Nature of the Forces that have acted on the Formation of the Land's End Granite'. She was the first woman to be elected a member of the Royal Geological Society of Cornwall. She was also an early member, with her friends Caroline Fox and Anna Maria Fox, of the Royal Cornwall Polytechnic Society at Falmouth, Cornwall.

She contributed many articles to the 'London Quarterly Review,' and published several books.

== Notable Ideas ==
Carne contradicted the idea that elevated sections of granite throughout England were caused by the erosion of the surrounding rock, instead suggesting that they were caused by external forces, or undulatory movements. One of Carne's papers on the subject was published posthumously in 'Transactions of the Royal Geological Society of Cornwall, Volume 9, Part 1'. Her explanation for the form of the granite landscapes was that it reflected differential pressures or forces at work. She reasoned that as certain locations within the granite were subject to greater pressure as they were forming, those areas might develop smaller crystals, and therefore be stronger. Following this logic, she explained that the abrupt angles noticed in the valleys were caused by faults that formed along the boundaries of stronger and weaker rocks, not erosion. She considered these forces have a "nature of a law", drawing on the ideas of geologic uniformitarianism. Carne concluded that these natural phenomena could have only been caused by a "great undulatory movement", like those caused by earthquakes. She explained that "unsettled", soft granite would be bent into swelling hills and valleys (folds), whereas hardened granite would snap (fault).

Carne also published in 'Transactions of the Royal Geological Society of Cornwall, Volume 9, Part 1', an account of metamorphism, where she suggested that, as evident in the multitude of structures that could be taken on by a single substance, rocks must undergo some type of change over time. Carne listed tremendous heat and pressure as the primary cause of these changes. Carne recognized that if some internal heat and pressure acted on one type of rock, she could assume that it also acted on the surrounding rock, further connecting her ideas to the theory of uniformitarianism. Later in her paper, Carne disputes the idea that the local granite was formed only by "igneous eruption", because of the precise arrangement of the surrounding rocks. Instead, she suggests that if its formation occurred when magma solidified, there would not be distinct layers of greenstone and purple rock surrounding the deposit. From this, she concluded that some other force, like pressure, must have influenced these formations.

== Death ==
Elizabeth Carne died at Penzance on 7 September 1873, and was buried at Phillack, five days later, on 12 September. Her funeral sermon was preached in St Mary's Church, Penzance, by the Reverend Prebendary Hedgeland on 14 September.

== Works ==
She was the author of:

- 'Three months' rest at Pau in the winter and spring of 1859’ — brought out with the pseudonym of John Altrayd Wittitterly in 1860.
- 'Country Towns and the place they fill in Modern Civilization,' Bell and Daldy, Covent Garden, London. 195 pp. 1868.
- 'England's Three Wants' — an anonymous spiritual pamphlet, 1871.
- 'The Realm of Truth,' Henry S. King & Co., London. 255 pp. 1873.

== See also ==
- Timeline of women in science
