= Great Bosullow =

Coordinates: 50.146°N 5.621°W

Great Bosullow: Cornish: Boschiwolow Veur
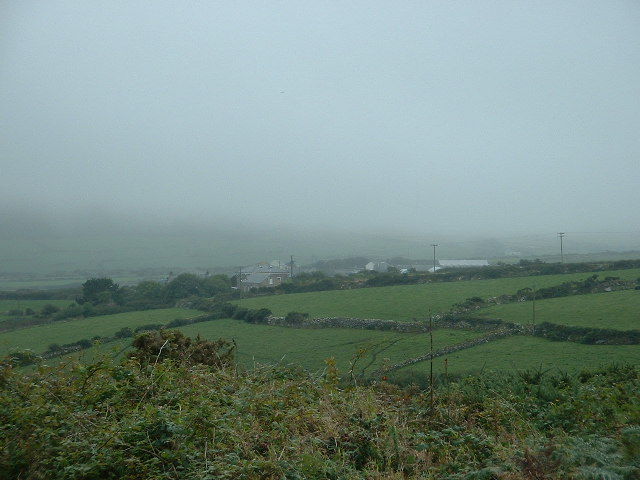
- Great Bosullow Farm

- Location within Cornwall
- OS grid reference: SW414336
- Civil parish: Madron
- Unitary authority: Cornwall
- Ceremonial county: Cornwall
- Region: South West
- Country: England
- Sovereign state: United Kingdom
- Post town: Penzance
- Dialling code: 01736

Great Bosullow (Cornish: Boschiwolow Veur, meaning dwelling of the great house of light) is a hamlet south-east of Morvah in west Cornwall, England, UK. Bosullow Common is an extensive area of heathland. Great Bosullow lies within the Cornwall Area of Outstanding Natural Beauty (AONB). Almost a third of Cornwall has AONB designation, with the same status and protection as a National Park.

The freehold of Great Bosullow was put up for auction on 24 April 1883. The property consisted of a house, barn, stable, cattle-house, piggeries and other outbuildings. There were 29 acres (12 ha) of arable and pasture land, about 25 acres (10 ha) of enclosed crofts and about 62 acres (25 ha) of shared common land, including Castle Downs and any minerals beneath. Also for sale was Little Bosullow which contained 13 acres (5.3 ha) of arable and pasture lane, about 33 acres (13 ha) of enclosed croft and the rights over Bosullow and other commons, containing about 45 acres (18 ha) and the minerals thereunder. The commons including a portion of Choone Castle, where there was good quantities of good building stone.

== See also ==
- List of farms in Cornwall
