= Trevarrack =

Hamlet in Cornwall, UK

Coordinates: 50°07′49″N 5°31′51″W

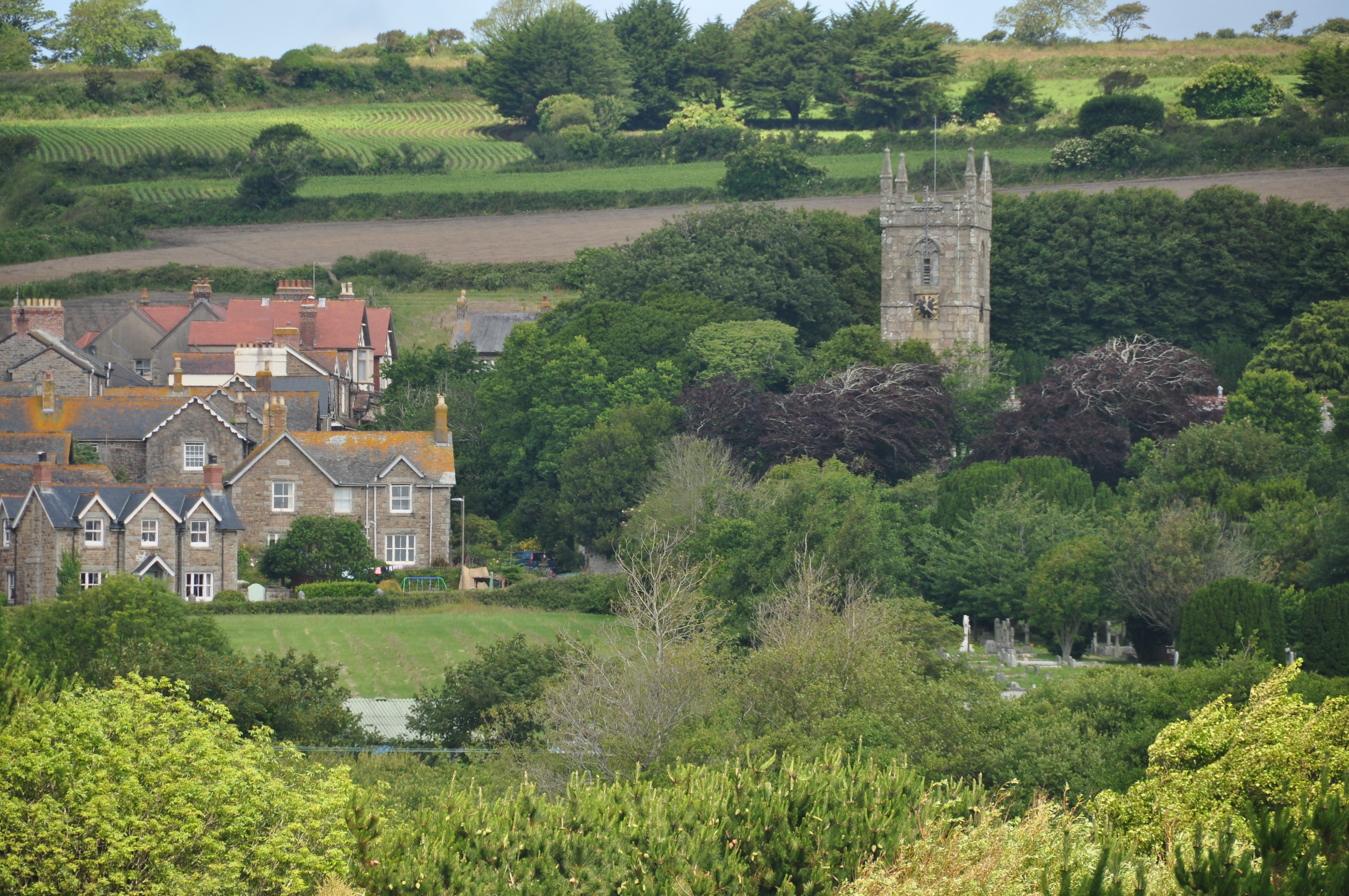
Church at Trevarrack

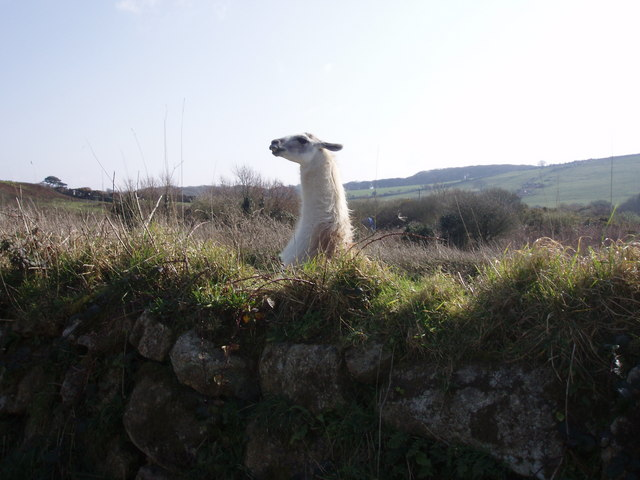
Llama at Trevarrack, Gulval

Trevarrack is a hamlet between Penzance and the village of Gulval, Cornwall, England, United Kingdom.

The memorial stone for the Wesleyan chapel was laid on 25 January, 1884. The architect was James Hick of Redruth and the contractor was William Mitchell of Scorrier who received £1400 for the work. The chapel was given a grade II listing in 1889 and described as ″... one of the best examples of a nonconformist chapel of this date in Cornwall.″
