= Little Bosullow =

Coordinates: 50.149°N 5.618°W

Little Bosullow: Cornish: Boschiwolow Vyghan
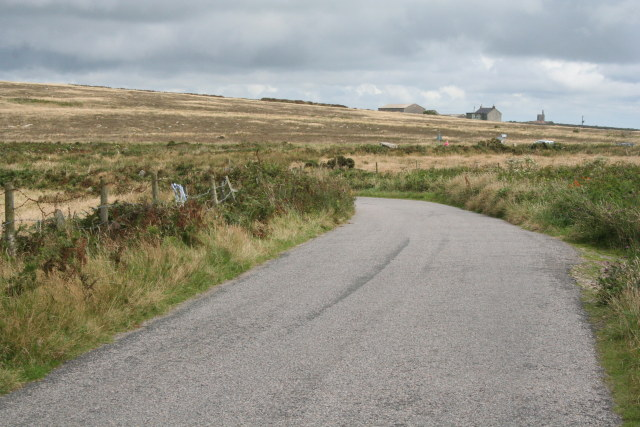
- Bosullow Common

- Location within Cornwall
- OS grid reference: SW416339
- Civil parish: Madron
- Unitary authority: Cornwall
- Ceremonial county: Cornwall
- Region: South West
- Country: England
- Sovereign state: United Kingdom

Little Bosullow (Cornish: Boschiwolow Vyghan) is a hamlet in the civil parish of Madron, Cornwall, England, UK. Great Bosullow is to the west, Bosullow is on the B3312 Madron to Morvah road and Bosullow Common is to the north.

== History ==
The Bosullow Wesleyan Methodists Chapel at Little Bosullow was renovated at the end of 1878 and reopened on 12 January 1879.

Great and Little Bosullow were put out to tender on 10 June 1880 for a term of seven or fourteen years from the next Michaelmas. The property consisted of a dwelling-house, outbuildings, 42 acres (17 ha) of arable and pasture land, 58 acres (23 ha) of enclosed crofts and the rights of common over 107 acres (43 ha).

On 19 May 1882 the cornerstone for a new school was laid by Mr T R Bolitho of Pedndrea, Gulval. It held forty pupils.
