= Carnes, Iowa =

- Unincorporated community
- Location within Iowa
- Coordinates: 42°55′38″N 96°03′25″W
- Country: United States
- State: Iowa
- County: Sioux
- Elevation: 1,273 ft (388 m)
- Time zone: UTC-6 (Central (CST))
  - Summer (DST): UTC-5 (CDT)
- Area code: 712
- GNIS feature ID: 464491

Carnes is an unincorporated community in Sioux County, in the U.S. state of Iowa.

== History ==
A post office was established at Carnes in 1890, and remained in operation until it was discontinued in 1914. The community was named for Edward Carnes, a railroad roadmaster. Carnes' population was 6 in 1902, and 35 in 1925. The population was 13 in 1940.
