= Ding Dong mines =

Old mining area in Cornwall

- Hwel Ding Dong (Cornish)
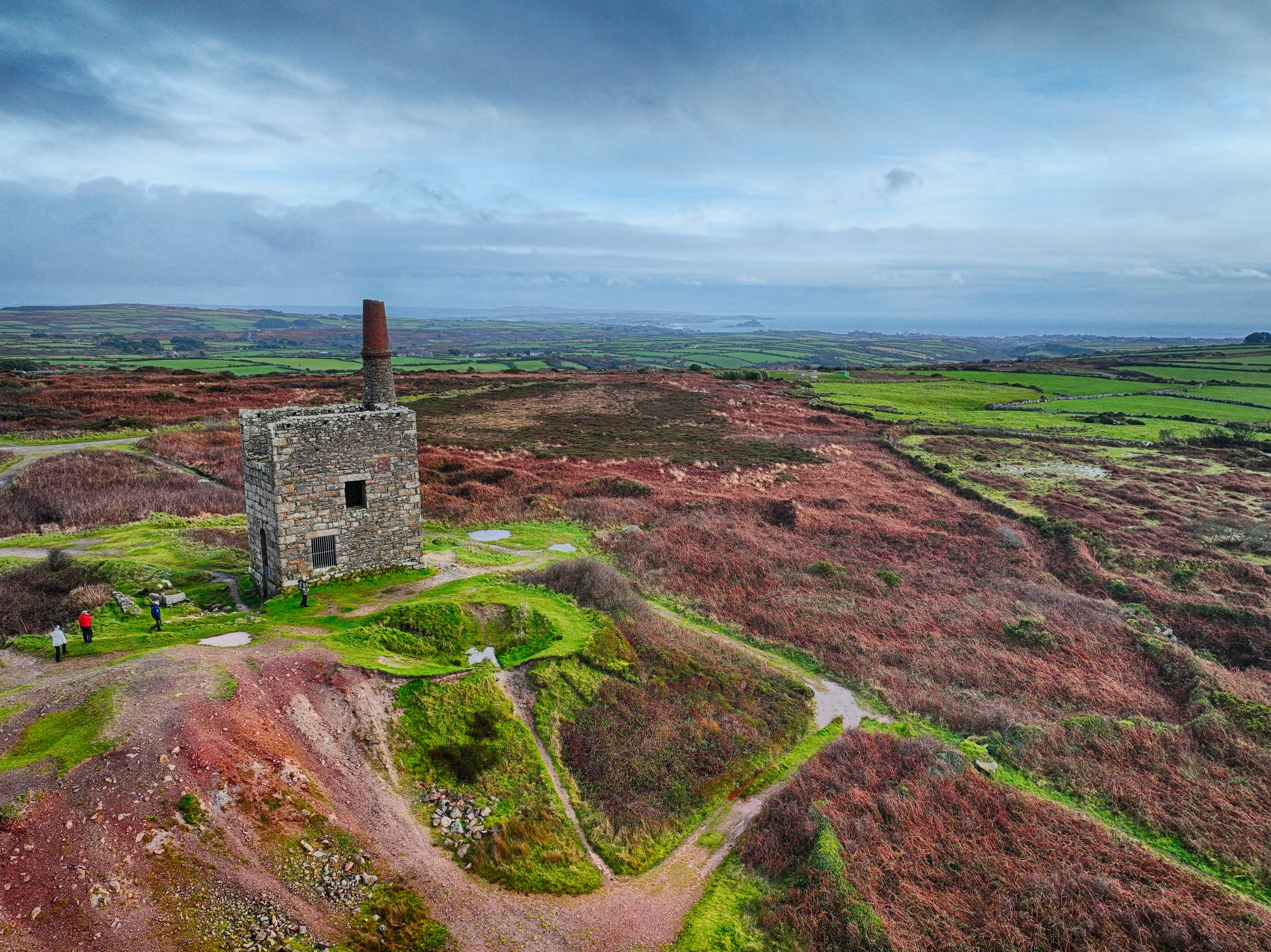
- Greenburrow pumping engine house from the air

- Location within Cornwall
- 50°9′15″N 5°35′34″W
- Type: industrial heritage, mine
- Location: Madron, Cornwall, England

Site notes
- Area: 500 acres (200 ha)

UNESCO World Heritage Site
- Type: Cultural
- Criteria: ii, iii, iv
- Designated: 2006 (30th session)
- Part of: Cornwall and West Devon Mining Landscape
- Reference no.: 1215
- Region: Europe and North America

Listed Building – Grade II
- Official name: Engine house at SW 442347, Ding Dong Mine
- Designated: 7 September 1988
- Reference no.: 1136718

Listed Building – Grade II
- Official name: Engine house at SW 434346, Greenburrow Mine
- Designated: 18 December 1986
- Reference no.: 1265075

The Ding Dong mines (Cornish: Hwel Ding Dong) lie in an old and extensive mining area in the parish of Madron, in Penwith, Cornwall. They are about two miles north east of the St Just to Penzance road and look over Mount's Bay and St Michael's Mount to the south west. Since 2006 the site has been a UNESCO World Heritage Site, part of Cornwall and West Devon Mining Landscape.

== Etymology ==
According to a 1936 book by Henry R. Jennings, the name may refer to the 'head of the lode' or the outcrop of tin on the hill. He also notes that in Madron church there is a 'Ding Dong Bell' that was rung to mark the end of the last shift of the miners.

== History ==
Near the mine ruins can be found the Bronze Age Nine Maidens Stone Circle, Carfury Standing Stone, the Men-an-Tol and Lanyon Quoit and the Ding Dong mines themselves. These are reported to be the oldest in the Westcountry, dating back to prehistoric times. Ding Dong mine is likely one of the oldest mines in the United Kingdom. It was described as having 22 tin lodes connected with it and as extending over 500 acres.

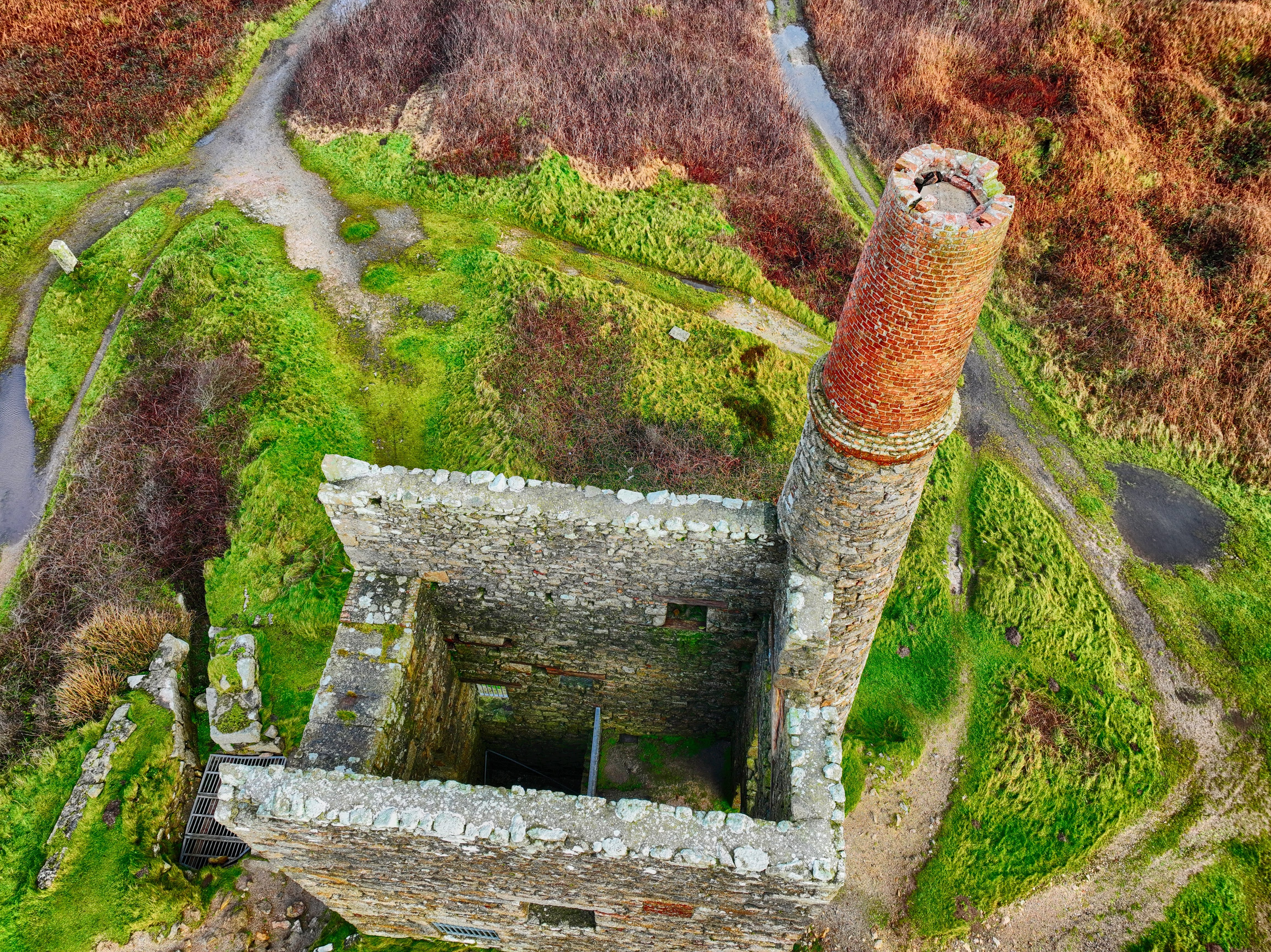
A closeup showing the engine house in 2023

=== 18th century ===
It is not known when the mine actually began to be worked. The earliest record of Ding Dong is given by John Norden at the beginning of the 18th century. In 1714 three separate mines were operating: Good Fortune, Wheal Malkin and Hard Shafts Bounds. By 1782 sixteen working mines were to be found in the area. and the present set include Ding Dong in the middle, Providence, Tredinneck and Ishmael's to the east and Wheal Malkin and Wheal Boys to the West.

Ding Dong obtained notoriety during the 18th century because of an infringement lawsuit. A 28-inch cylinder inverted engine designed by Edward Bull, chief designer for Boulton and Watt, was put into Ding Dong in 1796; James Watt saw this as an infringement of his 'condenser patent'. One of these engines was erected at Ding Dong in 1797, when a conventional Boulton and Watt engine was inverted by Richard Trevithick and William West. (Note: Trevithick kept process servers at bay during Watt's litigation by threatening to throw anyone who attempted to stop him down the shaft of his inverted engine.) Trevithick worked with his father at Wheal Treasury mine and, after making improvements which increased the operating pressure of the Bull Steam Engine, Trevithick was promoted to engineer of the Ding Dong mine in 1796. Today the ruined Count (Account) House is the only remaining structure from Richard Trevithick's time at Ding Dong. (Note: The old Count House was located at the centre of the mine property. It was destroyed by a fire in the mid-1800s; a new Count House was then built across the road. The site hopes to acquire enough funding to restore the Old Count House at Ding Dong Mine.)

=== 19th century ===
The Ding Dong mine was created in 1813 by combining 16 smaller mines in the area. By the middle of the 18th century, at least seven small concerns had sprung up although the name Ding Dong did not become the usual name until after the turn of the 19th century. In 1814 it was reopened and worked until 11 July 1877, when an attempt to sell it at auction as an active mine failed. (Note: An 1864 report said the mine was not making a profit at that time.)

The mine was said to be mining tin in granite in 1823. It was described as being 400 feet above sea level and 600 feet below the earth's surface. There were 120 men working underground at the time and they used 900lbs of candles each month to light their way in the mine. Every day, the mine's pumps removed 50,000 gallons of water from the mine; and 300lbs of gunpowder were used each month in the mine. The 1823 report said that the mine had been working for eight years. In 1839, the mine was described as employing 200-300 miners.

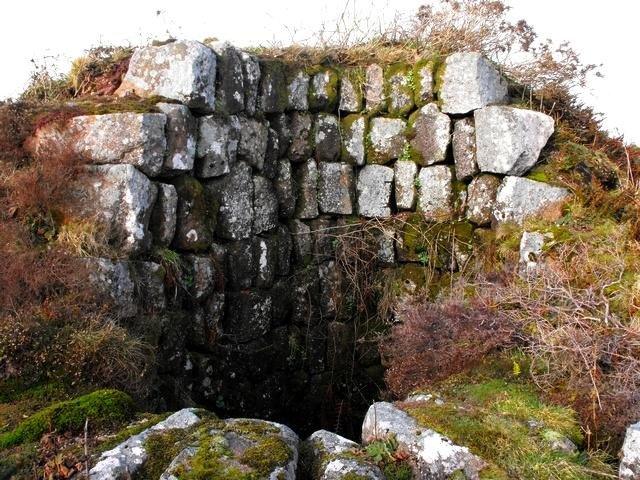
A shaft at the Ding Dong mine

The eastern veins of ore were exhausted by 1850, so the western veins became the area of primary production. In the period from 1855 until its closure, the mine yielded some 2,905 tons of black tin. Though there were 206 miners working there at the end of the 1850s, the mine struggled to meet its expenses.

Because of the shift in production from east to west, a pumping house was built at the Greenburrow shaft in 1865 and an engine was transferred there to pump water from it. There were two recorded instances of explosions at the mine which took place in the 1860s. Three slight explosions occurred at the mine circa 1860 when a previously underwater level of the mine was being re-opened. Another took place in 1868, with two miners being scalded followed by a second explosion two days later.

By 1870, production had increased enough for the mine to have 200 men working there. Not long before its closure in 1877, a new lode of tin had been discovered. During the 1870s the price of tin dropped due to the opening of tin deposits in Queensland and other parts of the British Empire. Due to this, and exhaustion of the local deposits, Ding Dong finally ceased production on 11 July 1877. It was reported in a May 1888 edition of the Cornishman newspaper, that one engine house (the easternmost) still had its engine and the other engine houses are in tolerable repair; the account house is in good condition and the blacksmiths’ and other workshops remain.

=== 20th century to present ===
When the price of tin rose in 1911, the mine's dump was explored and a new company, Ding Dong Mine Syndicate, began to work above ground. California stamps were installed; during the period from September 1912 to March 1915, 51 tons of tin were extracted from the hand-picked ore. The wartime drop in all metal prices brought this work at the mine to an end. Three later attempts to open the mine since that time were failures; the first was due to water issues but the last two were due to local opposition. The Ding Dong Mine is now part of the Cornwall and West Devon Mining Landscape World Heritage site. The mine's engine house has been designated a Grade II building since 1988.

== Legends ==
During the reign of Queen Victoria, the chief agent of the mine told a scientific inquirer, that many people said the mine was worked hundreds of years before Christ. Another legend was that Joseph of Arimathea visited the area accompanied by the young Jesus to address the miners; there is no evidence to support these beliefs. An old miner told A. K. Hamilton Jenkin "Why, they do say there's only one mine in Cornwall older than Dolcoath, and that's Ding Dong, which was worked before the time of Jesus Christ."

A folk song called "Ding Dong Mine" was written in 1986 by West-country singer Jerry Johnson. One verse tells of a disaster at the mine, although no official records or documents confirm that such a disaster happened. Johnson may have been using poetic licence to describe such similar occurrences in the area.

== See also ==
- Mining in Cornwall and Devon

== Sources ==
- The Annals of Philosophy, Volumes 21-22. R. Baldwin. 1823.
- Barton, Denys Bradford (1963). A Guide to the Mines of West Cornwall. Truro. ISBN 0-85153-032-X.
- Brown, Kenneth; Acton, Bob (2001). Exploring Cornish Mines, Volume 2. Landfall. ISBN 978-1-8734-4340-8.
- Chapman, David (2011). Walking in Penwith. Alison Hodge Publishers. ISBN 978-0-9067-2076-9.
- Collins, Joseph Henry (1912). Observations on the West of England Mining Region. Joseph Henry Collins.
- Gamble, Barry (2011). Cornish Mines: St Just to Redruth. Alison Hodge Publishers. ISBN 978-0-9067-2081-3.
- Foster, Clement le Neve (1905). A treatise on ore and stone mining. Griffin.
- Handbook for England and Wales. John Murray. 1878.
- Hunt, Robert (1887). British Mining: A Treatise on the History, Discovery, Practical Development and Future Prospects of Metalliferous Mines in the United Kingdom. Lockwood.
- Jennings, Henry R. (1936). Notes on the History of Madron, Morvah & Penzance.
- Matthews, John, ed. (1991). A Glastonbury Reader: Selections from the Myths, Legends, and Stories of Ancient Avalon. Harper Collins. ISBN 978-0-8503-0999-7.
- Mills, Catherine (2010). Regulating Health and Safety in the British Mining Industries, 1800-1914. Ashgate Publishing Ltd. ISBN 978-0-7546-6087-3.
- Pope, Rita Tregellas (2006). Landmark Visitors Guide Cornwall & the Isles of Scilly. Hunter Publishing Inc. ISBN 978-1-8430-6211-0.
- Journal of the Statistical Society of London, Volumes 1-2. Statistical Society of Great Britain. 1839.
- Spargo, Thomas (1864). Statistics and Observations on the Mines of Cornwall and Devon. Darling and sons.
- Trevithick, Francis (1872). Life of Richard Trevithick: With an Account of His Inventions, Volume 1. E. & F. N. Spon.
