= Harriet Carne =

Canadian businesswoman

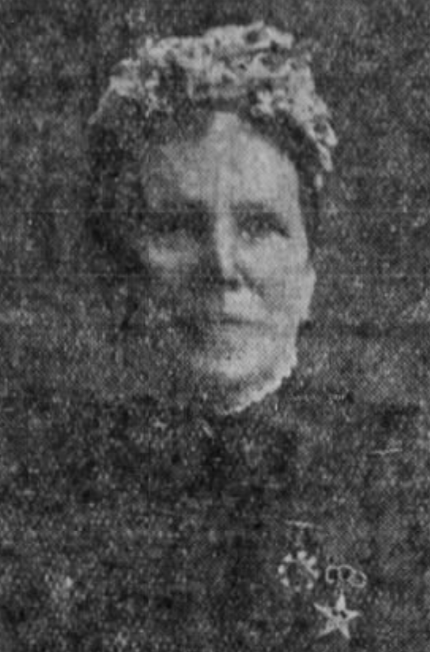
- Harriet Carne in her nineties
- Born: Harriet Richards; 27 February 1831; Cornwall, U.K.
- Died: 15 October 1931; Oak Bay, British Columbia, Canada
- Occupation(s): Hotelkeeper, philanthropist

Harriet Richards Carne (27 February 1831 – 15 October 1931) was a British-born Canadian businesswoman and philanthropist in Victoria, British Columbia. She was one of the three founders of the city's Aged Women's Home.

== Early life and education ==
Harriet Richards was born in Redruth, Cornwall, and raised by her grandparents in Devonshire.

== Career ==
She joined her husband in British North America in 1853, and they moved to Victoria in 1864. They ran the Angel Hotel for 37 years, beginning in 1873, and catering to prospectors by offering reliable storage as well as rooms and meals. When her husband was out of the province in 1886, he announced that she was legally empowered to handle his affairs.

Carne was a longtime attending member of the Metropolitan United Church in Victoria, a charter member and president of the local Rebekah Lodge, and, in 1898, one of the three founders of the Aged Women's Home. She sold the hotel and retired in 1911. She remained active in events at church and the Aged Women's Home into her nineties.

== Personal life ==
Harriet Richards married Cornish copper miner Frederick Carne. They had six children, four of whom survived her. Her husband died in 1904. Carne died in 1931, at the age of 100, while living with her daughters Amelia Whittier and Elizabeth Crimp, in Oak Bay.
