= Listed buildings in Gulval =

Gulval (Cornish: Lannystli) is a village in Cornwall, United Kingdom. Although historically a parish in its own right, Gulval was incorporated into the parishes of Penzance, Madron and Ludgvan in 1934, and is now considered to be a suburb of Penzance. This list contains listed buildings that are now within the parish of Penzance. It contains eight listed buildings that are recorded in the National Heritage List for England. Of these, one is Grade II*, the middle of the three grades, and the others are Grade II, the lowest grade. Four of the listed buildings are houses, the others are the parish church, one of the lychgates, a nonconformist chapel and a telephone box.

Name and location	Photograph	Date	Notes	Grade
Church of St Gulval; 50.132526°N 5.521086°W		12th century	Parish Church comprising nave, north and south aisles, chancel, west tower and south porch. The tower has three stages without buttresses and completed in 1440. Restored in 1858, 1885 and 1892.	II*
Trenow Cottage; 50.134433°N 5.527304°W	—	Early 18th century	Two-storey thatched cottage with colour-washed rubble and cob walls and two brick chimney stacks. There are four low and wide, small-paned windows which have sashes with glazing bars and revealed casing. The central door is from the late 19th century and has a tiled hood.	II
Little Rosemorran; 50.135422°N 5.533888°W	—	18th century	Granite rubble, two-storey house and byre with a slate roof with gabled and half-hipped ends. The house has two windows with small sashes and glazing bars, and a central plain door. The byre has 3/4 windows on the first floor and three loft doors. One of the ground floor entrances is wide with a large granite lintel.	II
Lower Trevaylor Cottage; 50.133382°N 5.538596°W	—	18th century	Painted rubble and cob, two storey cottage with the door in an open wood gabled porch. To the right is a stable door. There are three wide spaced windows with horizontally sliding sashes with glazing bars. The slurried slate roof has gable ends.	II
Helnoweth; 50.133985°N 5.529400°W	—	18th and 19th century	Two-storey house with coursed granite walls and slurried slate roof with gable ends. There are three wide spaced windows with sashes. An early 20th-century glazed porch encloses the central doorway.	II
Gulval Methodist Church and attached forecourt, walls, gates and railings 50.131211°N 5.528506°W		1884	A nonconformist chapel built with killas rubble and granite dressings in the classical style with some Gothic features. The central chapel bay has a mid Gothic style 3-light granite window with quatrefoil rose tracery. The other windows are round arched with glazing bars. On the right-hand return there are four bays and the left hand return has a gabled porch with a round-arched doorway to the front and a spoked fanlight over the panelled doors. The interior is complete and unaltered with a horseshoe amphitheatre seating arrangement. Considered to be one of the best nonconformist of this date in Cornwall.	II
North West Lynch Gate; 50.132742°N 5.521627°W		1897	The arches in the gable ends of north-west entrance to the churchyard are from the 13th-century north transept, and the walls are made of granite rubble. The sides are open and the roof is of slate.	II
K6 Telephone Kiosk; 50.133055°N 5.521877°W		Mid-20th century	A cast iron, K6 type telephone kiosk designed by Sir Giles Gilbert Scott. The kiosk is square with a domed roof and unperforated crowns to the top panels. There is margin glazing to the door and windows.	II
