= Chyandour =

Settlement in Penzance, Cornwall, England

Coordinates: 50.126°N 5.527°W

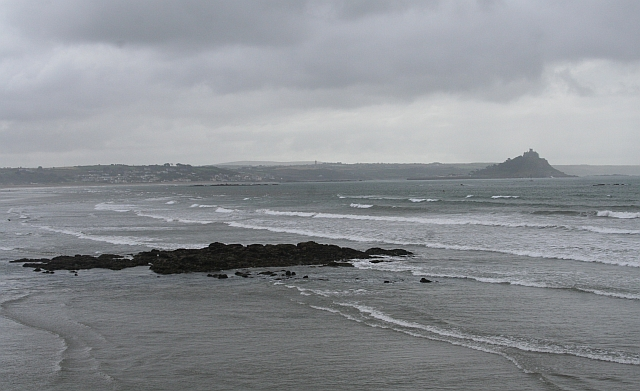
Chyandour

Chyandour (Cornish: Chi an Dowr, meaning "house of the water") is a small settlement within the town of Penzance in west Cornwall, United Kingdom. It is on the north-east edge of the town straddling the A30 trunk road. The Chyandour Brook rises near Carfury and flows into Mount's Bay at Chyandour. Before 1934 Chyandour was in the parish of Madron and was the site of a large tin smelting works.

== Industry ==
In around 1660 John Tremenheere, in anticipation of Penzance becoming a Stannary town, set up a smelting works, just outside the Borough of Penzance's boundary at Chyandour. In 1760 when Thomas Bolitho arrived in Penzance from Penryn, the smelting works at Chyandour was run by the Praed family. By the time tin production was at its maximum the business was run by the Bolitho family who lived in Coombe House, and in 1867 bought the estate at Trengwainton, Madron.

Still in use, the Bolitho Estate Office was built in 1860, and at that time the first floor was a bank with the vault under the caretaker's ground floor accommodation. Wagon drivers would stop at the bank to collect their money before driving up Chyandour Coombe to the smelting works. In 1883 the smelting works was the largest of nine in Cornwall covering 4 acres (1.6 ha) to 5 acres (2.0 ha). It consisted of a number of long, one storey, slated buildings with several chimneys belching smoke and flames. There were four furnaces which were built of brick 18 inches (460 mm) thick and clamped with iron bands. Each lasted five to six weeks, when it required rebuilding. Fifteen men worked twelve hour shifts, with nights every other week, for 19 shillings a week. The tin ore was stored between large wooden barriers (known as hutches) with each compartment storing differing qualities. The ore came straight from the mines, or from ″valuable″ Australian stream ore (containing 75% tin), or low quality ore from the ″Red River″. The ore was heated and the tin flowed into cast iron crucibles where it was re-heated to remove impurities. It was then ladled into bars, blocks, ingots, etc., which weighed from one pound to a hundredweight or more. A small iron slab with Messrs Bolitho's trade mark was laid on the molten tin to leave an impression and the tin was shipped within this country or exported to Russia, America, etc.

Anthracite was brought in by sea, the ships landing on the beach near the mouth of the Chyandour Brook, which was outside the boundary of Penzance and hence they did not have to pay harbour dues. The cargo was carried through the three tunnels under the railway line and hauled up the slipway to the smelting works. The works closed in 1912 and was demolished in 1930; some of the walls and crucibles can still be seen.

The tanning pits in the tanning yard and tens of thousands of pounds' worth of cured hides were removed in 1886. The yard was made into a ″shrubbery″.

== Legends ==
The area between Marazion and Chyandour was mostly marsh and the Eastern Green was haunted by a white lady who would rise from the marsh, jump on the back of a traveller's horse and ride pillion-fashion as far as the Red River (Chyandour Brooke), just below the smelting works.
