= Michael Carnes =

American composer (b.1950)

Michael Page Carnes (1950) is an American composer of contemporary classical music.

== Life and career ==
Carnes was born in North Carolina. The son of a piano teacher, he received his first formal musical training on trumpet in the public schools. He formed and played in several rock bands beginning in the late 1960s. While originally a performer of popular music and jazz, Carnes became interested in classical music and resumed his education.

He studied composition under John Bavicchi and Rudi Martinus van Dijk at Berklee College of Music where he received his BA in 1977, John Thow and Theodore Antoniou at Boston University where he received his master's degree in Music in 1980 and later with Gunther Schuller. His early works were largely built with extended tonality and reflective of jazz. These include a number of guitar etudes. In the years that followed, his music became more strongly chromatic, without an obvious tonal center. Principal works from this period include Fantasy Music 1 (for flute and taped electronic sounds), Fantasy Music 2 (for harpsichord and taped electronic sounds), and Marimba Concerto.

An intermediate period included Brass Quintet #2, War Songs (for voice and taped electronic sounds), and Variations (computer). More recently, his style has moved into a more flexible variant of the 12-tone technique. Recent works include Brass Quintet #3, Symphony: Challenger and Proper Motion (trio for flute, clarinet, piano) which had its world premiere at the Park City and Salt Lake City International Music Festival in 2005.

During his years in Boston, Carnes was a member of the "Composers in Red Sneakers" collective. In 1985, the group inaugurated the 8th season of contemporary music at New York's Symphony Space. Amongst the pieces on the program were two songs for mezzo-soprano and marimba by Carnes set to texts by e.e. cummings with Nancy Zeltsman on the marimba.

From 1980 until 2020, Carnes managed a separate career in technology, mostly at Lexicon. In 2012, he founded Exponential Audio, eventually selling the company to Izotope and retiring from the tech world. He has since resumed composing full time. Recent pieces include and so on (for pianist Jason Hardink) and Three Scenes for Woodwind Quintet (premiered by Intermezzo).

== Recordings ==
Fantasy Music 1 is included on the 1984 Northeastern Records LP, Composers in Red Sneakers.

== Sources ==
- Blotner, Linda Solow, "Michael Page Carnes", The Boston composers project: a bibliography of contemporary music, MIT Press, 1983. ISBN 0-262-02198-6
- Cleary, David, "The Boston New-Music Scene: Present and Recent Past, with Special Emphasis on Composers in Red Sneakers", 21st Century Music, June 2000, Volume 7, Number 6
- Holland, Bernard, "Review: Composers in Red Sneakers", New York Times, 13 October 1985
- Page, Tim, "Numic Notes; Moderns in Red Sneakers", New York Times, 6 October 1985.
- Reichel, Edward (August 21, 2005). "Music Fest Features Trio's Premiere". Deseret News. Salt Lake City. Archived from the original on November 2, 2012 – via HighBeam Research.
- Philadelphia Inquirer, "Bostonians Make Their Own Album", 23 June 1985, (subscription access)
