= Cornish Copper Company =

The Cornish Copper Company (CCCo) was originally a copper smelting business founded in Camborne, Cornwall in 1756. However it soon moved to Hayle and by 1758 had constructed its copper smelting works there. By 1769 the company had built the grade II listed Copperhouse Dock.

== Shipbuilding ==
The CCCo also engaged in shipbuilding and was responsible for the following ships;

- The Riviere, an iron schooner
- The Penair, an iron schooner launched in 1861
- The Margaret, an iron schooner launched in 1866
