= Marine de Carné =

French diplomat

- Education: Sciences Po
- Occupation: Diplomat

Marine de Carné is a French diplomat. She served as France's Ambassador to Monaco from 2016 to 2019.

== Early life ==
Marine de Carné de Trécesson de Coëtlogon comes from the de Carné family. She is related to Louis de Carné (1804-1876), a politician, journalist and historian.

She grew up in Montceau-les-Mines, Saône-et-Loire, France. She graduated from Sciences Po in 1985.

== Career ==
De Carné began her career in the finance industry. She joined the French Ministry of Foreign Affairs in 1987. She served in Brussels from 1989 to 1992, and in New York City from 1997 to 2001. She has served as France's Ambassador to Monaco from September 16, 2016 to September 2019.
