= Carfury =

Hamlet in Cornwall, England

Coordinates: 50.14963°N 5.57608°W

Carfury: Cornish: Karnfuri
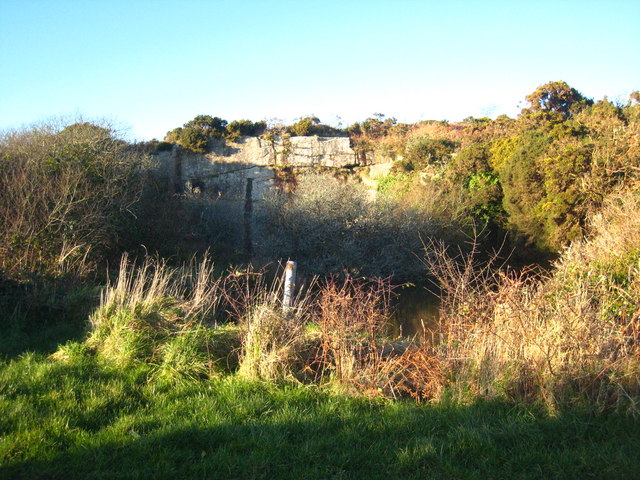
- A flooded quarry at Carfury

- Location within Cornwall
- OS grid reference: SW445341
- Civil parish: Madron
- Shire county: Cornwall
- Region: South West
- Country: England
- Sovereign state: United Kingdom
- Post town: Penzance
- Postcode district: TR20
- Police: Devon and Cornwall
- Fire: Cornwall
- Ambulance: South Western

Carfury (Cornish: Karnfuri, meaning cairn of the wise people) is a hamlet in west Cornwall, England, United Kingdom. It is situated in Penwith approximately three miles (5 km) northwest of Penzance. It is in the civil parish of Madron

The 19th-century geologist Elizabeth Carne founded a school in Carfury.

There are three listed buildings in Carfury, all Grade II: Carfury farmhouse and its front garden walls, farm buildings west of Carfury farmhouse, and a piggery north of the farmhouse.

== Carfury Bible Christian Chapel ==
Carfury Bible Christian Chapel was founded in 1821 with seating for 172. From 1907 to 1932, the chapel was known as Carfury United Methodist Church. It closed and the premises were sold in 1971. Records and papers relating to the Carfury Chapel are held by Cornwall Record Office.
