= Treneere =

Area of Penzance, Cornwall, England

Coordinates: 50.128°N 5.548°W

Treneere (Cornish: Trenyer, meaning farmstead of the chickens) is a residential council estate on the outskirts of Penzance, Cornwall. It was built in the 1930s in an effort to clear inner city slums, meaning the majority of residents have been poor for generations. Most of the housing within this area is owned and operated by Penwith Housing Association. Treneere falls within the Penzance East Ward of Cornwall Council.

== History ==
It takes its name from the nearby manor of Treneere which until the 1930s was the principal landowner in the area. Treneere Manor was originally one of the bartons of the Manor of Alverton. Treneere Manor is a Grade II* listed small mansion built in 1758.

In 2017 the estate was described in an Index of Multiple Deprivation report as "the most deprived neighbourhood in Cornwall".
