= Gulval =

Village in Cornwall, England

Coordinates: 50.1324°N 5.5217°W

Gulval: Cornish: Lannystli
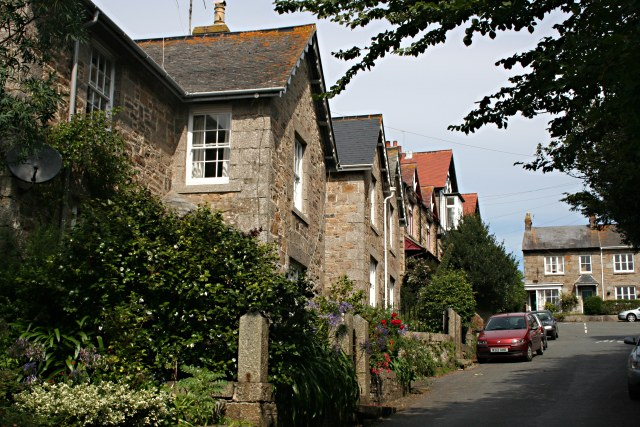

- Location within Cornwall
- OS grid reference: SW484318
- Civil parish: Penzance
- Unitary authority: Cornwall
- Ceremonial county: Cornwall
- Region: South West
- Country: England
- Sovereign state: United Kingdom
- Post town: PENZANCE
- Postcode district: TR18
- Dialling code: 01736
- Police: Devon and Cornwall
- Fire: Cornwall
- Ambulance: South Western
- UK Parliament: St Ives

Gulval (Cornish: Lannystli) is a village in the civil parish of Penzance, in Cornwall, England. Although historically a parish in its own right, Gulval was incorporated into the parishes of Ludgvan, Madron and Penzance in 1934, and is now considered to be a suburb of Penzance. Gulval still maintains its status as an ecclesiastical parish and parts of the village church date back to the 12th-century. Together with Heamoor, Gulval still retains its status as an electoral ward. The ward population at the 2011 census was 4,185.

== Name origins ==
The parish is named after a 6th-century saint, Gulval, the original form of which was probably Welvela or Wolvela. Baring-Gould thought this was Wilgitha, the sister of Saint Juthwara: David Nash Ford agrees. Gilbert Hunter Doble, however, favoured an identification with one of the male Welsh missionaries, Gudwall or Gurwall who are honoured in Brittany, eponym of Locoal-Mendon. A life of each one is to be found in the Acta Sanctorum, June; Bollandists, 1867. Neither identification has been widely accepted by modern scholars. Previous spellings of the parish include St Welvela de Lanesky (from 1301), St Welvele (1327), St Welvele de Lanystly (1328), Gwelvele/Wolvele de Lanescly (c.1400), St Golvele (c.1400) and Gulval/Lanesly (1535). The parish church is dedicated to Gulval and their feast is celebrated on 12 November.

== History ==
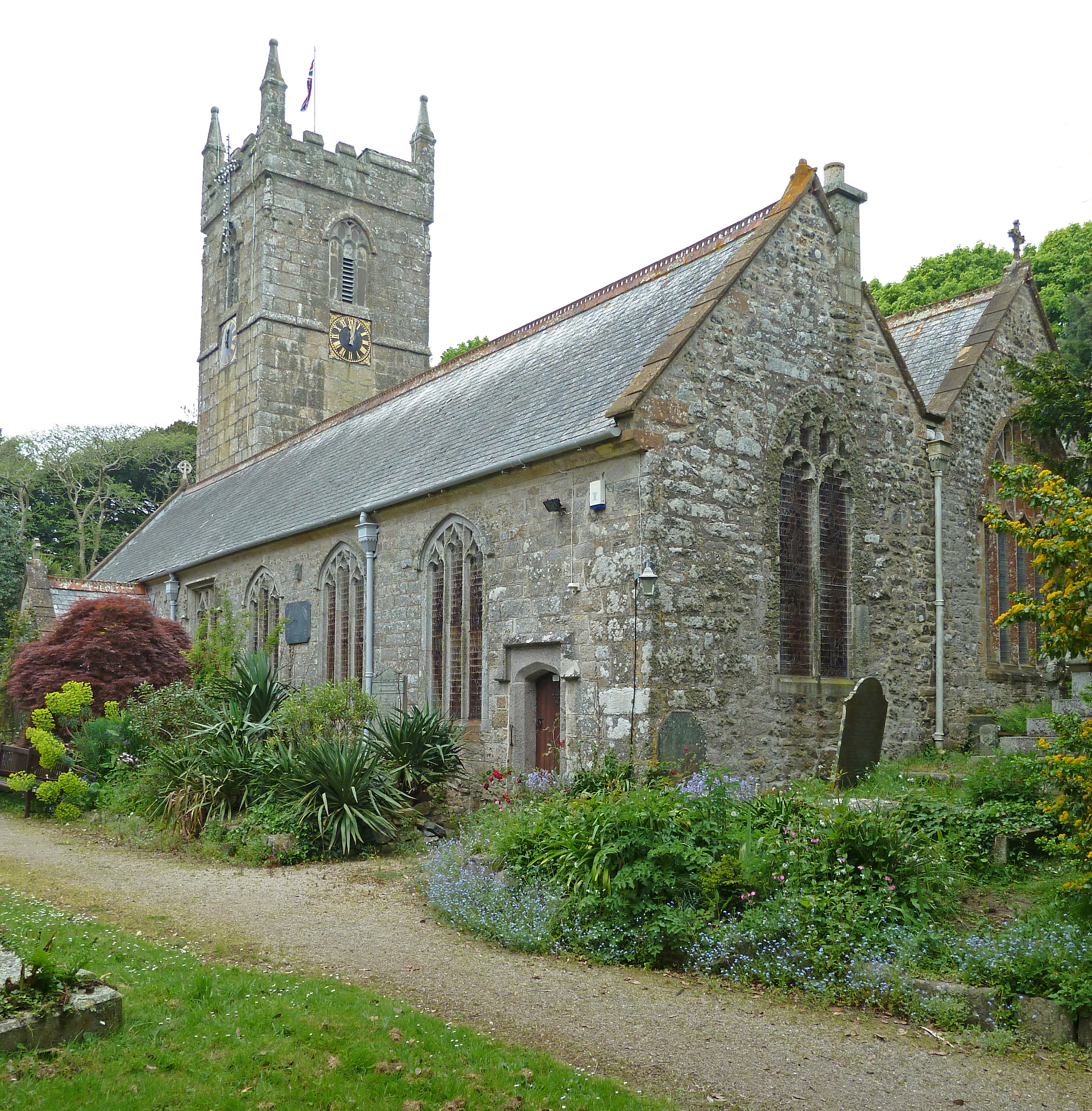
Gulval Church

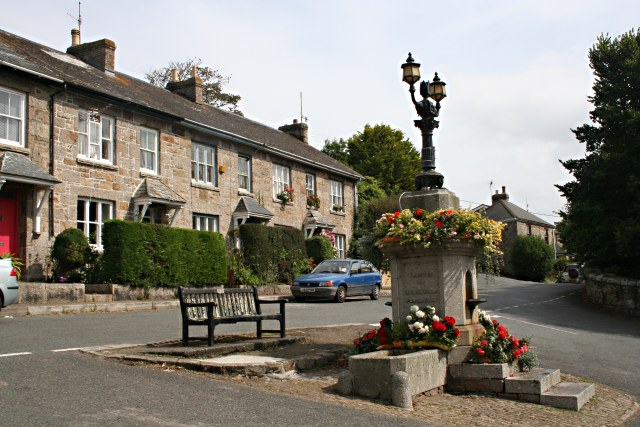
An ornate drinking fountain, designed for both humans and horses but now used as a floral display

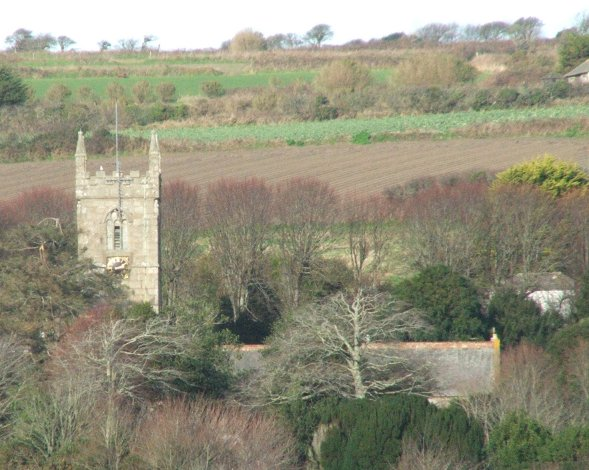
Gulval Church

During the Iron Age there was a lot of activity in the area, and a few miles from Gulval, beyond the hamlet of Badgers Cross, are the remains of the Chysauster settlement. The site shows the remnants of nine courtyard houses, of a type only found on the Land's End peninsula and Isles of Scilly, and was inhabited from the first century BC for the following four hundred years. The historic Celtic site is now under the protection of English Heritage.

Two inscribed stones attest to continued occupation in the early medieval period. The first is a memorial for "Quenatucus, son of Dinvus", and has been dated as carved sometime between fifth and eighth centuries; it stands near one end of a footbridge in Balowena Bottom. The second is a cross-shaft lacking base or cross-head with a now illegible inscription; it was found in a wall of the church in 1885, and now stands in the churchyard. (see also, Gulval Church, below)

There is a Cornish cross at Rosemorran; on the front of the head is a crude crucifixus figure and on the back is an unusually shaped cross (the only similar one is at Lelant).

In ancient times Gulval was known as Lanisley, derived from Lan, a church, and ishei, low, (i.e. the low church). According to Charles Henderson (quoted by Doble (1960)) this is a corruption of Laniskley. A Latinised version of this, Landicle, is mentioned in the Domesday Book:

"Roland holds [LANDICLE](GULVAL) from the Bishop; In the time of King Edward (the Confessor, i.e. before 1066) it paid tax for 1 hide (around 120 acres); 1½ hides there however. Land for 12 ploughs (requiring, perhaps, 8 oxen each); in lordship 1 plough; 3 slaves. 13 villagers and 4 smallholders with 3 ploughs. Meadow 2 acres (0.81 ha), Pasture, 2 leagues long and 1 league wide. Value formerly and now £3. 1 virgate (about 30 acres) held by the lord, 1 hide 3 virgates by the villagers; also "1 cob; 3 cows; 30 sheep". (Roland was the Archdeacon of Cornwall.)

At some point in the late 20th or early 21st century, Gulval became home to a colony of peacocks. The peacocks continue to live wild in the village.

== Landmarks ==
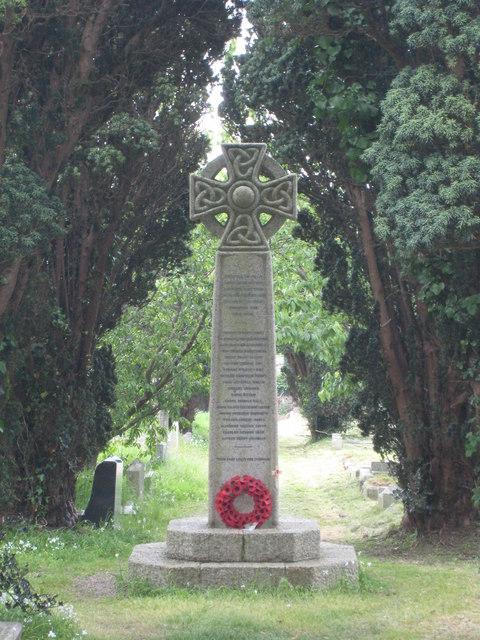
Gulval war memorial

There is a war memorial located in Gulval Church's cemetery, with 18 soldiers from WWI and 10 from WWII.

== Gulval Church ==
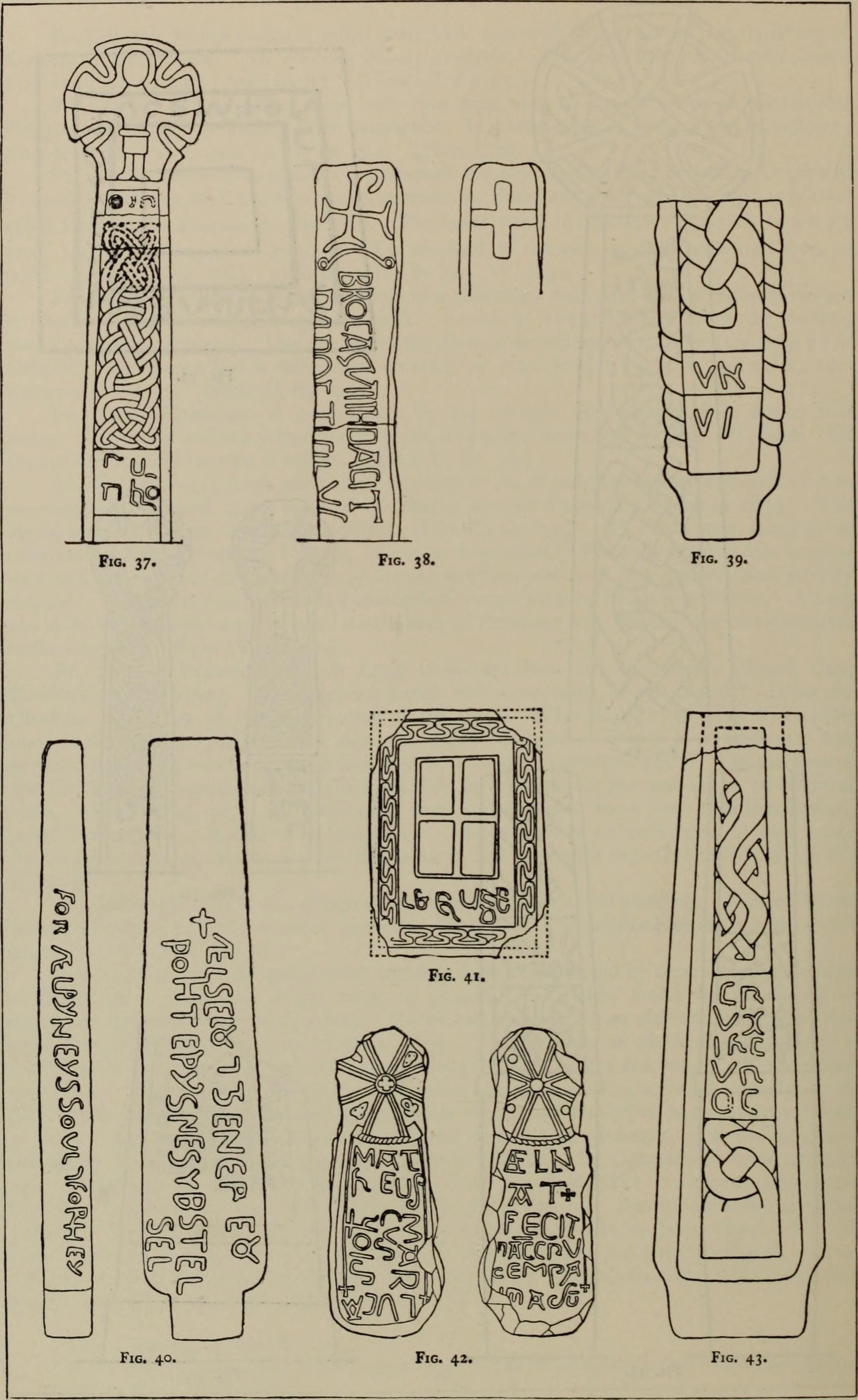
A plate from The Victoria History of the County of Cornwall (1906); fig. 39 shows the inscribed front of the Gulval cross which has the letters "VN / VI"

The current church building is predominantly 12th-century with subsequent additions. Most notable of these are the tower, built in 1440 and containing eight bells, and a large stone lych-gate that was added in 1897 to celebrate Queen Victoria's Diamond Jubilee. The churchyard was extended on the southern side in 1882 and a lych-gate erected, opposite Posses Lane. The land was donated by the Lords of Llanisley manor. The wooden roof of the north gateway was presented by the architect Piers St Aubyn of Devonport in July, 1885. OS maps up to at least 1962 had the name of the church "St Gulwal", probably mimicking the local accent.

There is an ornamented Cornish cross shaft in the churchyard. It was found in 1885 when the chancel was restored. The chancel was formed of two walls with the space between them filled with loose clay-like rubble and the cross was used to bond the two walls together. The cross is re-erected in the churchyard, and is of the Greek form and has the letters ″I A″ inscribed, which is thought to refer to St Ia, of St Ives.

There is a stained glass window commemorating William Wingfield, MP, in the church. One of the vicars of Gulval, the Rev. William W. Wingfield, was vicar for a remarkable 72 years, from 1839 until his death in 1912. In 1873, during Wingfield's tenure, the churchyard was extended on the northern side and a row of elm planted.

== Legends ==
=== Joseph of Arimathea ===
Within the bounds of the parish lies the disused Ding Dong mine, reputedly one of the oldest in Cornwall. Popular local legend claims that Joseph of Arimathea, a tin trader, visited the mine and brought a young Jesus to address the miners, although there is no evidence to support this. The Ding Dong mines have, according to tradition, been worked since Roman times but by the end of the 18th century it was disused. In 1814 it was reopened and worked until 1878. Attempts were made in 1912 and 1928 to reopen, but these failed.

== Notable people ==
- Dudley Savage (20 March 1920 – 25 November 2008), theatre organist known for the long-running BBC radio request programme "As Prescribed", was born in Gulval.

== Local government and village amenities ==
For purposes of local government Gulval is included in the civil parish of Penzance and has its own single member ward on Penzance town council. The principal local authority in the area is Cornwall Council. Elections to Cornwall Council are by way of a three-member Penzance electoral division.

Gulval is home to a post office and general store, a public house – the Coldstreamer – and a primary school that houses 144 pupils.

In 1931 the parish had a population of 1292. On 1 April 1934 the parish was abolished and merged with Penzance, Madron and Ludgvan.

== Transport ==
The A30 runs to the south of Gulval Churchtown between Long Rock and Penzance. The main bus route through Gulval is number 16.

Penzance itself has more transport links, including a railway station.

== Sport and recreation ==
Gulval has two football teams competing in the Trelawny League and two cricket teams competing in the Cornwall Cricket League. The Old Inn – a pub in Gulval Churchtown – was given to the Coldstream Guards Association in memory of Capt Michael Lempriere Bolitho and renamed "The Coldstreamer" (Capt Bolitho was killed on HMS Walney, a Royal Navy ship; her task was to crash through the boom at the entrance to Oran Harbour in Operation Torch on 8 November 1942).

The local community radio station is Coast FM (formerly Penwith Radio), which broadcasts on 96.5 and 97.2 FM.

=== Cornish wrestling ===
Cornish wrestling tournaments for prizes were held at the Mead Hall in Gulval.

John Roberts (1820–1892) known as "Johnnah" or "John-a" and was a famous champion heavyweight wrestler in the 1840s and 1850s, that more than once beat Gundry. After one such occasion, at the Penzance tournament, he was marched from one end of the town to the other accompanied by the mayor, several dignitaries and a band. He was subsequently the "quiet and unobtrusive" landlord of the "Old Inn" at Gulval for 30 years.

== See also ==
- Listed buildings in Gulval
