= Cornish festivals =

Cultural events of Cornwall, England

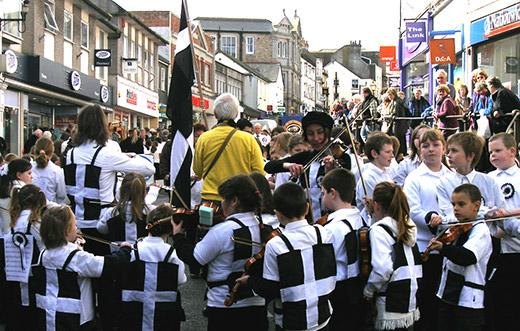
Celebrating St Piran's Day in Penzance

The cultural calendar of Cornwall is punctuated by numerous historic and community festivals and celebrations. In particular there are strong links between parishes and their patronal feast days (which are often days not directly linked to official church patronal celebrations). There is also a tradition of holding celebrations associated with tin mining and fishing.

== Modern community festivals ==
Since the 1980s there has been a development of community based festivals in Cornwall often named after a famous local resident. These have included Murdoch day in Redruth, the Daphne du Maurier Festival in Fowey, Trevithick Day in Camborne and the Montol Festival in Penzance. Other modern festivals include, Falmouth oyster festival, Newlyn fish festival, Lowender Peran in Perranporth, Dehwelans Kernow and many more.

In Moonta, South Australia, the Kernewek Lowender (Cornish for "Cornish happiness") is the largest Cornish festival in the world and attracts tens of thousands of visitors each year.

== Historic festivals ==
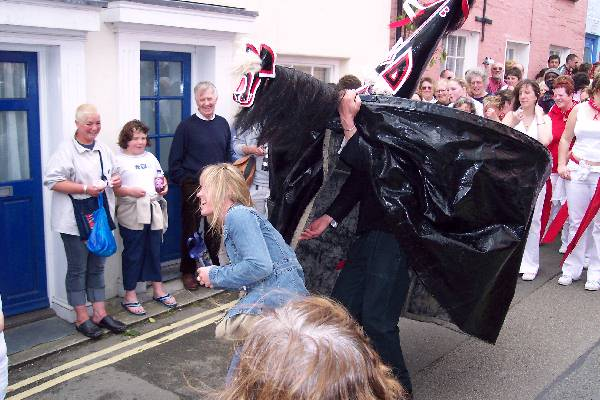
The 'Old Oss' capturing a maiden at Padstow 'Obby 'Oss festival

The following list is of festivals celebrated past and present in Cornwall which can be traced back over 100 years or more; often these celebrations have considerable antiquity. These have been classified separately to the above because they form a part of a Cornish indigenous culture. There have been attempts and successes to revive these celebrations where they have fallen into disuse. Today many of these ceremonies are kept alive by members of the Federation of Old Cornwall Societies.

† = Parish feast day

Historic festivals and feast days of Cornwall
Name	Location	Current Status	Date
Allantide	Throughout Cornwall	Celebrated in some parts of West Cornwall - Largely replaced by Halloween	31 October
Corpus Christi †	Penzance	A big local fair lasting several days, but now lapsed (possibly due to land-lease issues).	C-C is actually 1st Sunday after Whitsun, but Fair was held 2nd/3rd week in June
Golowan †	Throughout Cornwall in particular Penzance	Revived in various forms 1920s, 1935, 1990	Around 23 June
Midsummer Hilltop Bonfires	Throughout Cornwall in particular Kit Hill, Carn Brea, Castle An Dinas	Revived in various forms from 1930	23 June
Flora or Furry †	Helston	Continuously celebrated with a short break in the Victorian era	8 May unless a Monday or Sunday then Saturday before.
'Obby 'Oss festival	Padstow	Still celebrated	Around 1 May
St Piran's Day †	Throughout Cornwall	Originally a miners' holiday now Cornwall's national day	5 March. The largest festival across Cornwall is still celebrated in Redruth, the Capital (and beating heart) of Cornish Mining.
Nickanan Night also called Peasen Monday	Throughout Cornwall	Unknown - not publicly celebrated	Shrove Monday
Tom Bawcock's Eve	Mousehole	Continuously celebrated before World War II and revived in the 1950s	23 December
Picrous Day	East Cornwall	Still celebrated in Luxulyan	Second clear Thursday before Christmas
Chewidden Thursday	West Cornwall	Unknown - Not publicly celebrated	First clear Thursday before Christmas
Madron Feast †	Madron, Heamoor & formerly Penzance	Still celebrated	Advent Sunday and Monday
St Just Feast †	St Just in Penwith	Still celebrated	First Sunday and Monday in November
West Cornwall May Day celebrations	West Cornwall	Revived since 2001 in St Ives and since 2008 in Penzance	1 May
Guise dancing	Throughout Cornwall	Still practised in some places including the Montol Festival in Penzance	Christmas through to Twelfth Night and Plough Monday
Paul Feast †	Paul, Mousehole and Newlyn	Continuously celebrated	Sunday nearest 10 October and week following
Sennen Feast †	Sennen	Still celebrated	Advent Sunday
Crying The Neck and Guldize	Throughout Cornwall	Still celebrated	September
Bodmin Wassail	Bodmin	'Wassail' is not of Cornish origin, probably migrated as a 'custom' from Wessex as it is of Saxon/Norse origin, but obviously adopted as a way to hedge bets for a good cider-apple harvest, and still celebrated	New Twelfth Night (6 January): In the 1950s, "carolling" was the custom)
Knill Ceremony	St Ives	Still celebrated (started 1801)	25 July (St James Day every 5 years)
St Keverne Feast †	St Keverne	Still celebrated	Sunday nearest 18 November
St Breward Feast †	St Breward	Still celebrated	Sunday nearest 22 February
St Day Feast †	St Day, Carharrack	Still celebrated	End of June
St Buryan Feast †	St Buryan	Still celebrated	Sunday nearest 13 May
Mevagissey Feast †	Mevagissey	Still Celebrated - Related to Golowan	Around 29 June (St Peters Day)
Towednack Cuckoo Feast †	Towednack	Still celebrated	Around 28 April
Goldsithney Charter Fair	Goldsithney	Still celebrated	St James Day (Old Style) 5 August
Zennor Feast †	Zennor	Still celebrated	Sunday nearest 6 May
Porthleven Petertide celebrations †	Porthleven	Still celebrated; Related to Golowan	Near 29 June
Gulval Feast †	Gulval	Still celebrated	Near 6 June
St Ives Feast (Feast Monday) †	St Ives	Still celebrated	Sunday and Monday nearest 3 February
Hurling the Silver Ball	St Columb Major	Still celebrated	Shrove Tuesday and then again on the Saturday eleven days later
Mawgan Feast †	Mawgan-in-Meneage	Still celebrated	Near 8 June
Mullion Feast †	Mullion	Still celebrated	Sunday nearest 6 November
Camborne Feast †	Camborne	Still celebrated	Near 15 November
Sancreed Feast †	Sancreed	Still celebrated (Patronal church service)	Early June
St Endellion Feast †	St Endellion	Still celebrated (Patronal church service)	Sunday nearest May Bank Holiday
St Stythians Feast †	Stithians	Still celebrated; Agricultural show held on the following Monday	Sunday closest to 10 July
St Allen Feast †	St Allen	Still celebrated but unknown to what extent	22 February (Traditionally Rogation Sunday)
Bodmin Riding	Bodmin	Still celebrated as part of Bodmin Heritage and Riding festival	Late June or early July
Morvah Fair	Morvah / West Cornwall	No longer celebrated but Morvah Pasty Day takes place on the same date, claimed by some to be the largest Lughnasadh celebration outside Ireland	1 August
St Erth Feast †	St Erth	Unknown	31 October
Ludgvan Feast†	Ludgvan	Still celebrated	Monday and Sunday nearest 29 January
St Hilary Feast†	St Hilary, Cornwall	Still celebrated	Mid-January
Davidstow Feast†	Davidstow	Still celebrated	1 March
Gunwalloe Feast†	Gunwalloe	Still celebrated	3 March
Porthleven Feast†	Porthleven	Still celebrated	22 February
St Kew Feast†	St Kew	Still celebrated	8 February
