= Cornish dance =

Dance originating in Cornwall, UK

Cornish dance (Cornish: Donsyow kernewek) originates from Cornwall, UK. It has largely been shaped by the Cornish people and the industries they worked in. In most cases, particularly with the step dancing, the dances were still being performed across the region when they were collected.

Cornish dance can roughly be divided into 3 areas: 'Scoot' or step dancing, 'Furry' or Feast Day dances and dance which you will often find in a 'Troyl', the Cornish equivalent of a céilidh. More recently the Nos Lowen (Happy Night) dancing has attracted interest and popularity being a simpler, spontaneous form of social dancing to Cornish traditional tunes such as jigs, hornpipes, waltzes and reels.

== Early history ==
Mediaeval toponymy Cornish stone circles and rows are often called maidens. Significantly, medn is late Cornish for stone. The associated legend (of petrifaction for dancing or playing on the sabbath) is clearly post-Christian. The timing of language change from Cornish to English suggests mediaeval naming, though some may be more recent. The stone circles and rows apparently suggested circular and linear dances to their namers, reflecting the popularity of mediaeval rondes and farandoles.

Church statutes The earliest documentary account which may refer to dancing in Cornwall is the statute banning (inter alia) round dances in churchyards issued in 1287 by Bishop Peter Quinel of Exeter.

Cornish verse dramas The Cornish-language Ordinalia of 1375 contains invocations to dance at the end of Origo Mundi and Resurrectio Domini. Later Cornish verse-dramas have similar passages.

Morris and mumming There is copious documentary evidence of morris dancing and mumming from 1466/7 to 1595. Iconography at Altarnun church suggests performance of the Mattachins about 1525.

Country and social dancing The MS of John Giddy (c1740) has music for Minuets, Rigadons, and Hornpipes. The Morval House MS (c1768) and the Francis Prideaux MS indicates familiarity with minuets and a wide range of country dances. By the time of the MS of John Old of Par (1808) some Scottish country dances are also being danced. To these quadrilles, waltzes and polkas were added as the century progressed, as shown by many documentary and MS references.

Community dancing The tune of the Helston Furry dance is used by Weekes in his 1608 madrigal Since Robin Hood, which suggests a late mediaeval origin for such celebrations. Community or Furry Dances are hinted at from 1700 when Edward Lluyd noted that 'Elygen' (Illogan) held its 'feast or furri day the first Sunday before or after St. Lukes' The 1781 journal of Christopher Wallis, Helston Attorney, mentions the Hendre (ancient) Furry Day at Helston. Such community dances, often associated with fairs or religious feasts seem to have been very widespread in Cornwall.

== 19th-century community and social dance ==
Furry Dances There are many 19th century reports of furry dances. The Helston Furry Dance was reported in The Gentleman’s Magazine of 1790. In the West Briton in 1959 Ashley Rowe wrote. 'In the peace rejoicings at the defeat of Napoleon in 1814 Truro danced the Flora for several hours; at Falmouth they danced until midnight on the Wednesday, Friday and Saturday; Penzance people also danced.' According to Wm. Penaluna, writing in 1834, the Furry was danced in Penryn on 3 May and in Sithney and the Lizard on 1 May. Rowe also notes 'When Victoria was pronounced Queen in 1837, Falmouth and Chacewater danced the Flora.' On Coronation day 1838 Trewoon, near St. Austell, held its Flora Dance and at Truro the Mayor led the dance, which lasted till the small hours' He also tells that St. Mawes celebrated winning a lawsuit over fishing rights by dancing the Flora in 1842.' It was seen in St. Ives in 1884. Even the Newlyn riots of 1896 were accompanied by Paul brass band playing Jon the Bone (Helston furry)! The earliest evidence of Padstow's May Day revel is 1802, though, like furry dances, the tradition is probably much older.

Troils In fishing communities a dance or ‘troil .. always terminated the pilchard season. This was a feast for those connected with the cellars, each cellar having its own troil. After the feast, which was given in the loft, games and dancing followed. These were kept up until the small hours of the morning, the music being provided by a fiddler.' In 1870 William Bottrell considered music integral to harvest home, feast days, even visits to the mill. He mentions 3-hand reels, jigs and ballads sung for dancing. M. A. Courtney, writing in about 1880, mentions a circle dance in Mounts Bay on the feasts of St. John and St. Peter. A 'snake-walk' dance at a tea treat c1900 was described in the Cornish Tales of Charles Lee, possibly the composer of the song Lamorna. Gorseth Kernow piper Merv. Davey’s grandfather, Edward Veale, remembered seeing the step dance, Lattapuch, in the Unity Fish Cellars, Newquay in the 1880s. These reports are born out by dance collection. In 1997 set, linear and step dances were still in living memory.

Geese dancing ‘Geese dancing’ (pronounced geeze) was also popular, however it was not a dance form, rather a form of mumming that could include dance, music, singing, processions, games, cross-dressing and disguise. The term guise dancing is specific to west Cornwall and took place across the twelve days of Christmas. Margaret Courtney mentions geese dancers and a 'hobby horse' near Lands End about 1812. Writing in about 1880 Robert Hunt also described geese dancers. His guise dancers performed in the 12 days of Christmas and on Plough Monday with a disguise of tattered paper headgear. One was often a man dressed as a woman. They sang 'popular ditties' and performed a mummer's play. In The Delectable Duchy 'Q' (the writer Arthur Quiller-Couch) tells of mummers, guise-dancers and darky parties in c1892. Bottrell describes guise-dances as light-hearted plays in doggerel with music and dance interludes. Perhaps these shows, formalised in Nance's Cledry Plays were the last evolution of the mummers' art. Many mummers' plays have been collected in Cornwall, notably by Robert Morton Nance. Morris is sometimes associated with mumming and some tunes used for morris are in Cornish MSS, but there is no evidence of the dance in 19th century Cornwall.
