= Guldize =

Cornish harvest festival

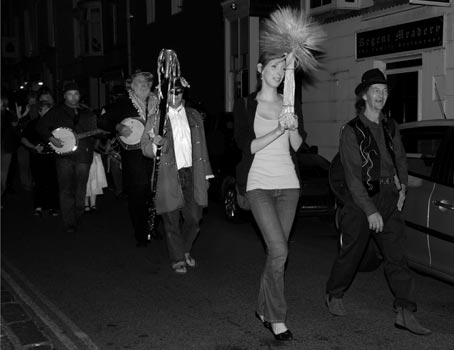
Guldize procession with "neck" Penzance 2008

Guldize, Gooldize (sometimes Dicklydize or Nickly Thize) is the harvest festival of the Cornish people. Guldize is an anglicization of Cornish Gool dheys "the feast of ricks" (i.e., grain stacks). The festival was held at the end of the wheat harvest and took the form of a vast feast usually around the time of the autumnal equinox. The ceremony of Crying The Neck took place before the feast, the neck being formed into a Corn dolly, which presided over the celebrations. Since 2008 a revived Guldize celebration has been held in Penzance and since 2010 in several other locations across Cornwall.

== Historical description ==
A. K. Hamilton Jenkin wrote in his book Cornish Homes and Customs,

On the evening of the day on which the neck was cut the harvesters would repair to the farmhouse kitchen. Here numerous company in addition to farmers own family would sit down to a substantial meal of broiled pork and potatoes, the second course consisted of Apple pie, cream and 'fuggans' the whole being washed down with cider and spirits.

The playing of music and communal singing followed sometimes throughout the night. A number of songs in particular have been recorded as being sung on these occasions, including "Green Brooms", "Here's a health to the barley mow", and "Harvest Home".

A number of customs were also associated with the feast; a man would have been chosen to rush to the site of the feast with the corn neck and enter the building by stealth avoiding an appointed lady who would have soaked the carrier of the neck if discovered. If this game was successful then the carrier of the neck would have been entitled to take a kiss from the female "guard" of the property.

The earliest reference to Guldize was in 1602 by Richard Carew in his Survey of Cornwall.

== See also ==
- Golowan festival
- Allantide
- Furry dance
- Harvest festival
