= Guise dancing =

Christmastide practice in Cornwall, UK

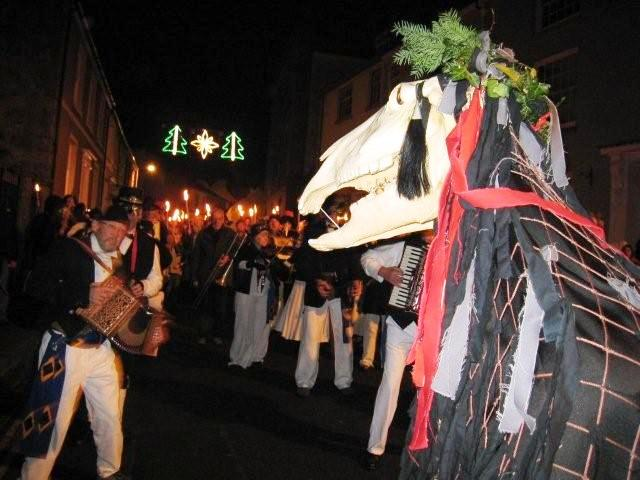
Penglaz the Penzance 'Obby 'Oss and Guise or Geese dancers at the 2007 Montol Festival

Guise dancing (sometimes known as goose, goosey or geese dancing) is a form of community mumming practiced during the twelve days of Christmastide, that is, between Christmas Day and Twelfth Night in West Cornwall, England, UK. Today, guise dancing has been appropriated for feast days at other times of the year.

Guise dancers dress in a disguise to hide their identity allowing them to perform in an outlandish or mischievous manner in the hope of receiving payment of food or money. The principal activities associated with guise dancing have changed through time. These have included the performance of Christmas plays such as Duffy and the Devil or St George and the Turkish Knight and traditional Cornish dance, music and song.

== Historical description ==
Guise dancing was observed in the late 19th century by Cornish antiquarian M. A. Courtney who reported that the practice had been largely eliminated by 1890 in Penzance due to a decline in the traditional nature of the celebrations and a rise in anti-social behaviour, the practice however could be found in St Ives, Newlyn and Mousehole St Ives finally ceasing in the 1970s. Mummer's Day in Padstow is considered by many to be the last form of traditional Guise dancing left, but is distinguished by the use of different music and the lack of masks, which are replaced by blackened faces.

Masks are the most notable feature of Guise dancers both historic and modern with "Bal masqué" being a common type of mask on display, animal masks, and plainer masks also present.

William Bottrell in his book Traditions and Hearthside Stories of West Cornwall (1870–80) describes in detail the guise dancers in Penzance, including their traditional costume.

During the early part of the last century the costume of the guise dancers often consisted of such antique finery as would now raise envy in the heart of a collector. The chief glory of the men lay in their cocked hats which were surmounted with plumes and decked with streamers and ribbons. The girls were no less magnificently attired with steeple crowned hats, stiff bodied gowns, bag skirts or trains and ruffles hanging from their elbows.

== Modern Guise dancing ==
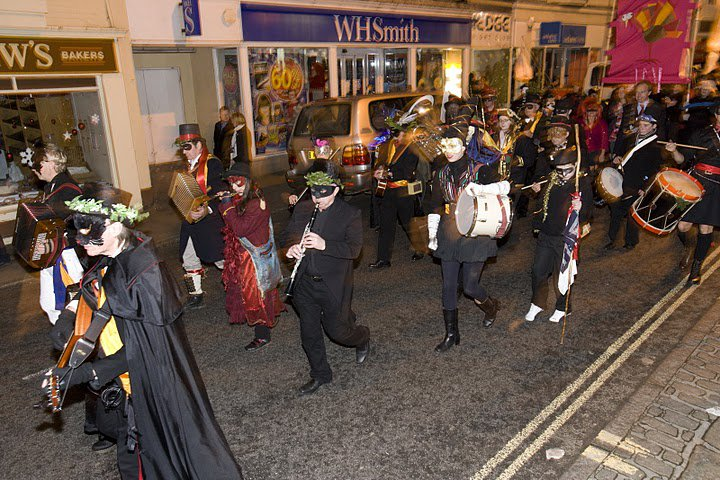
Processional Guise Dancing at the Montol festival 2008

There has been a rise of interest in Guise Dancing in Cornwall in recent years with new groups adopting the practice throughout Cornwall. The most notable being the Turkey Rhubarb band in Penzance, The St Ives Guisers and Pyba. The Turkey Rhubarb band and Pyba both regularly appear with 'Obby 'Osses, Penglaz and Pengyn respectively, both of which are the "Skull and pole" variety. Penglaz of course being most famous for its appearances at the Golowan festival in late June accompanied by the Golowan band.

Modern guise dancing can be divided into roughly three types of activities, firstly, large processional "carnival" parades which hundreds or even thousands take part, secondly smaller more intimate performances in public houses and the like and thirdly, bands of Christmas players who perform the Christmas plays described above. Many of the tunes now performed as part of Guise dancing are taken from the canon of Cornish traditional tunes and dances collected in the 1970s and 1980s by Merv and Alison Davy and others.

Most modern Guisers dress in "mock posh" costume or hand me downs decorated with ribbons and tatters. Masks of all types with the exclusion of modern fancy dress masks and the like are common.

Guise dancing is practised as part of the St Ives feast celebrations and forms the main part of the Montol Festival in Penzance.

== BBC recording ==
Guise dancers pictured in the 1970s in St Ives

On 5 January 1935, the Madron Guise Dancers performed for the BBC's Regional Programme Western. From the programme's description:

Twelfth Night, for instance, is the last day when one may meet with the Guise Dancers on their rounds and tonight we may expect a visit from the people of Madron, near Penzance.

In December 1937, the BBC made a recording for the BBC Regional Programme at Landithy Hall in Madron of the plays and music associated with Guise dancing. It was performed by the Madron Guise Dancers. However this recording has subsequently been lost. Performances associated with this practice include 'St George and the Turkish Knight' and 'Duffy and Devil.' Each performance allegedly ended with the 'Turkey Rhubarb' dance, the origins of the name of this dance are not known but may relate to the herb of the same name.

== See also ==
- Mummers play
- Montol Festival
- Tom Bawcock's Eve
- Golowan
- Furry Dance
- Allantide
- West Cornwall May Day celebrations
