= Tom Bawcock's Eve =

Annual festival in Mousehole, Cornwall, England

The lantern parade for Tom Bawcock's Eve

Tom Bawcock's Eve is an annual festival, held on 23 December, in Mousehole, Cornwall.

The festival is held in celebration and memorial of the efforts of legendary Mousehole resident Tom Bawcock to lift a famine from the village by going out to fish in a severe storm. During this festival stargazy pie (a mixed fish, egg and potato pie with protruding fish heads) is eaten and depending on the year of celebration a lantern procession takes place.

== Origins ==
There are several theories of the origins of this festival, but the first recorded description was made by Robert Morton Nance in 1927 in the magazine Old Cornwall. Nance described the festival as it existed around the start of the 20th century. Within this work Nance also speculated that the name Bawcock was derived from Beau Coq (French) - he believed the cock was a herald of new light in Pagan times and the origins of the festival were pre-Christian. The most likely derivation of the name 'Bawcock' is from Middle English use (influenced by French) where "bawcock" is a nickname for a fine or worthy fellow. An example of such use can be found in Shakespeare's Twelfth Night Act 3. Scene 4: "Why, how now, my bawcock!" As the name Tom was often used as a generic description for any man, it is likely that Tom Bawcock was a symbolic name for 'any fine fellow' who risked his life in pursuit of fishing. Midwinter celebrations were also common in one of Cornwall's other principal traditional occupations: mining. Picrous Day and Chewidden Thursday seem to have similar origins to Tom Bawcock's Eve. The only similar tradition in the British Isles that can be traced is St. Rumbold's night at Folkestone in Kent. This celebration also took place near Christmas time where eight whitings were offered in a feast to celebrate St. Rumbold In Italy, a Christmas Eve feast including numerous fishes is called 'Il Cenone', 'Big Dinner', or sometimes 'Cena della Vigilia' (the dinner of the vigil). Today the observance the feast of the Vigil is rarely practised in Italy, but survives in Italian-American households, where it is better known as the Feast of the Seven Fishes.

== The Mousehole Cat ==
The children's book The Mousehole Cat by Antonia Barber was inspired by the traditions and practice of Tom Bawcock's Eve and resulted in a television production of the same name. (Ms Barber lists Star-Gazy Pie as a staple of Mousehole diet before Tom's heroic fishing expedition, however, whereas according to tradition it dates from his return and legendary catch.)

== Folk music traditions ==
There is an ongoing folk music tradition associated with Tom Bawcock's Eve. The words were written by Robert Morton Nance in 1927, to a traditional local tune called the 'Wedding March'. It is believed that Nance first observed the festivities around the start of the 20th century. His version runs as follows:

Side by side comparison
The original wording

A merry plaas you may believe
woz Mowsel pon Tom Bawcock's Eve.
To be theer then oo wudn wesh
To sup o sibm soorts o fesh!

Wen morgee brath ad cleard tha path
Comed lances for a fry,
An then us had a bet o scad
an starry gazee py.

Nex cumd fermaads, braa thustee jaads
As maad ar oozles dry,
An ling an haak, enough to maak
a raunen shark to sy!

A aech wed clunk as ealth wer drunk
En bumpers bremmen y,
An wen up caam Tom Bawcock's naam
We praesed un to tha sky.

The poem in modern English

A merrier place you may believe
Was Mousehole on Tom Bawcock's eve
To be there then who wouldn't wish
To sup on seven sorts of fish

When murgy broth had cleared the path
Comed lances for a fry
And then us had a bit o' scad
And starry gazey pie

Next comed fair maids, bra' thrusty jades
As made our oozles dry
And ling and hake, enough to make
A running shark to sigh

As each we'd clunk as health were drunk
In bumpers brimming high
And when up came Tom Bawcock's name
We praised him to the sky.

The dialect used in the words of the song translate as follows:-

- 'Morgy' = Morgey: Cornish 'seadog' is still the term used in Cornwall and Scotland for Dogfish
- 'Lances' = Sometimes 'Launces' Sand eels
- Rauning/Running = Hungry or Ravenous
- 'Scad' = Horse Mackerel
- 'Fair Maids' = Smoked Pilchards - a corruption of 'formade', from the Spanish word 'fumade' or smoked.
- 'bra' thrusty jades' = Bra' is short for 'brave' and 'Jade' is an old word used in England and Scotland to mean 'Wild young woman'
- 'Oozles' = Throats (windpipes)
- 'Clunk' = to swallow; Cornish; kolennki 'swallow'
- Bumpers = large glass, full to overflowing

The song appears on four of the albums by Cornish singer Brenda Wootton: Piper's Folk (1968), Starry Gazey Pie (1975), Way Down to Lamorna (1984) and Voice of Cornwall (1996).

== See also ==
- Guise dancing
- Montol Festival
- Golowan
- Furry Dance
- Allantide
- West Cornwall May Day celebrations
