= Taralily =

Rice harvest festival in Madagascar

Taralily is an annual rice harvest festival held on the island of Madagascar.
