= Mummer's Day =

Midwinter celebration in Cornwall, England

Mummer's Day, or "Darkie Day" as it is sometimes known (a corruption of the original Darking Day), is a traditional Cornish midwinter celebration that occurs every year on Boxing Day and New Year's Day in Padstow, Cornwall. It was originally part of the pagan heritage of midwinter celebrations that were regularly celebrated throughout Cornwall where people would take part in the traditional custom of guise dancing, which involves disguising themselves by painting their faces black or wearing masks.

There has been controversy in the British media regarding Mummer's Day, due to the blackened faces and the term Darkie Day, with commentators interpreting the festival as racist.

== Controversy over Mummer's Day ==
Once an unknown local charity event, the day has recently seen controversy due to increased media coverage. While the original celebration had no connection with black people, in modern times, it is usually considered racist for white people to "black up" for any reason. Although some commentators have linked the day with racism, Padstonians insist that this is not the case and deny both the description and the allegations.

=== 1970s review ===
Long before the controversy, Charlie Bate, a noted Padstow folk advocate, recounted that in the 1970s the content and conduct of the day were carefully reviewed to avoid potential offence. The Devon and Cornwall Constabulary have taken video evidence twice and concluded there were no grounds for prosecution. Nonetheless protests resurface annually. The day has now been renamed "Mummer's Day" in an attempt to avoid offence and identify it more clearly with established British tradition. The debate has now been subject to academic scrutiny. It is hoped that some of the more untraditional Minstrel songs that were incorporated in favour of traditional Cornish songs will soon be discontinued.

=== Minstrel songs ===
Although Mummer's Day is a centuries-old tradition, the act of performing minstrel songs owes its origins to the late 19th and early 20th century. Either as a result of confusion as to the real origins of disguise in the festival, or as a way of introducing more popular tunes in place of the well-preserved and still-performed Padstow carols, songs connected with jazz and the blacked-up minstrel craze of the era (which ultimately created huge stars such as Al Jolson) became associated with the guise dancing practices of the festival. The works of American songwriter Stephen Foster particularly featured.

Regardless of its origins, the minstrel songs contributed to the recent controversy over the festival due to the association with black people, despite the face painting having no connection. In order to revert to the original meaning of the festival, and recognising the offence that can be caused in the 21st century, the minstrel songs are being phased out of the festival, and the alternative name of Mummer's Day is now preferred.

== See also ==
- Golowan festival
- Mummers Parade
- Tom Bawcock's Eve
