= West Cornwall May Day celebrations =

Folk celebrations in Cornwall, England

An original Mayhorn from the 1930s

The West Cornwall May Day celebrations are an example of folk practices found in the western part of Cornwall, England, United Kingdom, associated with the coming of spring. The celebration of May Day is a common motif throughout Europe and beyond. In Cornwall there are a number of notable examples of this practice including the Obby Oss in Padstow and Furry Dance or Flora day in Helston. The celebrations are in contrast to the Cornish midwinter celebrations that occur every year such as the Penzance Montol Festival and the Padstow Mummer's Day festival.

== Practice before the 20th century ==
Prior to the 20th century it was common for young residents of the towns of Penzance and St Ives and other nearby settlements to conduct their own festivities. During this festival it was usual to make 'May Horns' usually fashioned from tin cans and 'May Whistles' made from small branches of the sycamore tree. The tree branches also formed decorations for people's homes.

The following is from a contemporary description of the events themselves in 1881 collected by Robert Hunt in 'Popular Romances of the West of England.

The May Horns procession in 2008 revival of the West Cornwall May Day celebrations in Penzance

THE first of May is inaugurated with much uproar. As soon as the clock has told of midnight, a loud blast on tin trumpets proclaims the advent of May. This is long continued. At daybreak, with their "tintarrems," they proceed to the country, and strip the sycamore-trees (called May-trees) of all their young branches, to make whistles. With these shrill musical instruments they return home. Young men and women devote May-day to junketing and picnics.

It was a custom at Penzance, and probably at many other Cornish towns, when the author was a boy, for a number of young people to sit up until twelve o'clock, and then to march round the town with violins and fifes, and summon their friends to the Maying.

When all were gathered, they went into the country, and were welcomed at the farmhouses at which they called, with some refreshment in the shape of rum and milk, junket, or something of that sort.

They then gathered the "May," which included the young branches of any tree in blossom or fresh leaf. The branches of the sycamore were especially cut for the purpose of making the "May-music." This was done by cutting a circle through the bark to the wood a few inches from the end of the branch. The, bark was wetted and carefully beaten until it was loosened and could be slid off from the wood. The wood was cut angularly at the end, so as to form a mouth-piece, and a slit was made in both the bark and the wood, so that when the bark was replaced a whistle was formed. Prepared with a sufficient number of May whistles, all the party returned to the town, the band playing, whistles blowing, and the young people singing some appropriate song.

== Revival in St Ives & Penzance ==
St Ives in recent years has successfully revived some of the customs described above as part of its May Day celebrations. In 2008, Penzance revived some of these customs as part of a one-day community event called the "Penzance May Horns". These events are now held every year in the town.

== See also ==
- Furry Dance
- 'Obby 'Oss festival
- May Day
- Golowan
- Allantide
