= Helston Town Band =

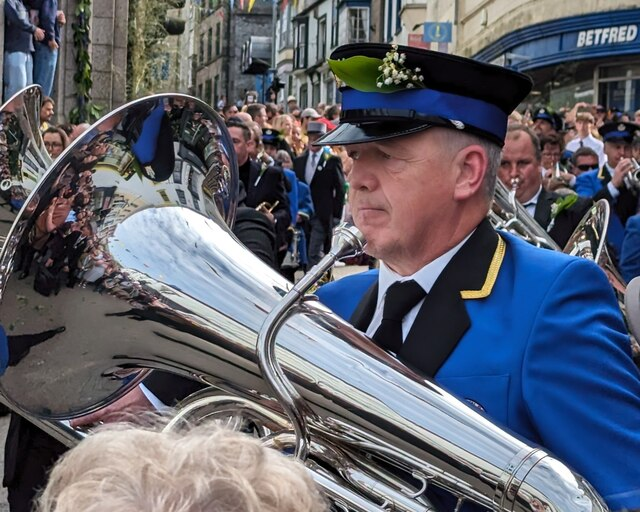
Performance on Flora Day 2024

Helston Town Band is a brass band based in the Cornish town of Helston.

== History ==
During World War II, the band reformed with new members, and in 1946 numbers were consolidated when most of its pre-war members returned from active service. The band steadily progressed during this time, which culminated in 1951 when it reached the National 3rd Section Finals at Belle Vue, Manchester.

In 1967, the band came under the direction of Edward Ashton, with whom the band gained much success and a reputation for consistently playing music to a high standard. Ashton's leadership resulted in successes for the band in both local and regional contests, until his retirement in November 2002.

Following his retirement, the band appointed John Hitchens as their new musical director, continuing the band's competitive success. In 2003, they were crowned Cornish First Section Champions, and in 2004 they gained promotion to the National First Section.

In 2006, the band achieved first place in the West of England First Section Championship, and received an invitation to compete in the National First Section Finals in Harrogate, where they achieved 7th place. The band competed in the West of England First Section Championships again in 2007, achieving third place, however became champions again after winning the following year. These results meant that Helston Town Band earned a promotion and competed in the Championship Section in 2009 for the first time in its history.

Several members of the current band whose family connections extend back four generations. As of February 2025, 5 members have been associated with the band for over forty years.

== Flora Day ==
Helston Town Band has an association with Helston Flora Day, when 'our quaint old Cornish town throngs with thousands of people'. Flora Day is usually held on 8 May unless it falls on a Sunday or Monday.

Brighouse and Rastrick Band recorded its own version of 'The Floral Dance' in 1977 with the help of Terry Wogan, which reached No. 2 in the singles chart. Whilst the Furry Dance firmly has its roots in Helston, no 'ownership' of the music or dance can be claimed. However, it has passed down the generations of Helston bandsmen and women, no written music exists. The Flora Dance is sacred to Helston Town Band and has never been written on manuscript to ensure it remains only within the band.

On Flora Day, there are four dances throughout the day led by the band:

- Early morning dance (7am): ladies in summer dresses, men in grey flannels and white shirts.
- Children's dance (9.50am): Helston school children all dressed in white.
- Midday dance: ladies in full-length dresses, men in morning suits and tails.
- Evening dance (5pm): dress as the early morning dance.

The first and last dances are led by Helston Senior Band, who are joined by the Junior Band, Beginners Band and invited guest players for the remaining dances. In total, senior band members cover 16 miles - playing the Flora Dance nearly 1000 times.

== See also ==
- Brass band (British style)
