= Golowan Festival =

Midsummer celebrations festival in Cornwall, UK

A bagpipe band from Mid Argyll walk along Alverton Street

Golowan (sometimes also Goluan) is the Cornish language word for the Midsummer celebrations in Cornwall, UK; they were widespread prior to the late 19th century and most popular in the Penwith area and in particular in Penzance. The celebrations began on St John's Eve (23 June) with bonfires, fireworks, dancing and music, followed by a fair around the town quay on Midsummer Day (feast of St John the Baptist, 24 June) and were repeated on St Peter's Eve (28 June) and St Peter's Day.

In 2021, Golowan commissioned an exhibition which celebrated 30 years of the revived festival and explored the historical roots of Penzance's Midsummer revels. It included extensive 19th century newspaper extracts including many first-hand accounts of events across the town, including the wider context of Midsummer bonfires across Europe.

The midsummer bonfire ceremonies (Tansys Golowan in Cornish) were revived at St Ives in 1929 by the Old Cornwall Society and since then spread to other societies across Cornwall, as far as Kit Hill near Callington. Since 1991 the Golowan festival in Penzance has revived many of these ancient customs and has grown to become a major arts and culture festival; its central event Mazey Day now attracts tens of thousands of people to the Penzance area in late June.

The 2024 Golowan Festival dates are 21 to 30 June with Mazey Day taking place on Saturday 29 June.

== The historic festival ==
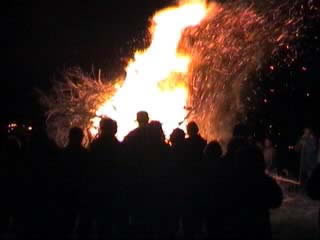
Tansys Golowan held at Castle An Dinas near St Columb Major.

The ancient festival was first described by Dr William Borlase in 1754 in his book Antiquities of Cornwall:

"In Cornwall, the festival Fires, called Bonfires, are kindled on the Eve of St. John the Baptist and St. Peter's Day; and Midsummer is thence, in the Cornish tongue, called 'Goluan,' which signifies both light and rejoicing. At these Fires the Cornish attend with lighted torches, tarr'd and pitch'd at the end, and make their perambulations round their Fires, and go from village to village carrying their torches before them; and this is certainly the remains of the Druid superstition, for 'faces praeferre,' to carry lighted torches, was reckoned a kind of Gentilism, and as such particularly prohibited by the Gallick Councils: they were in the eye of the law 'accensores facularum,' and thought to sacrifice to the devil, and to deserve capital punishment."

=== Penzance ===
Penzance's Midsummer festivities were one of the last examples of this practice in Cornwall. The celebrations themselves were centred on the lighting of fireworks, tar barrels, and torches on the evening of 23 June every year (St John's Eve). Towards the end of these festivities the local youths of the town would take part in the ancient serpent dance called "thread-the-needle" and jump or pass themselves through the dying embers of the flames. During these celebrations it was also usual to elect a Mock Mayor or Mayor of the Quay. In 1864 it was recorded that the organising committee of the festival let off "258 dozen fire crackers and numerous Roman Candles, Jack-in-box and sky rockets" The day after these celebrations, a 'Midsummer's Day' fair took place on Penzance quay; boat rides and other entertainments were included in these celebrations.

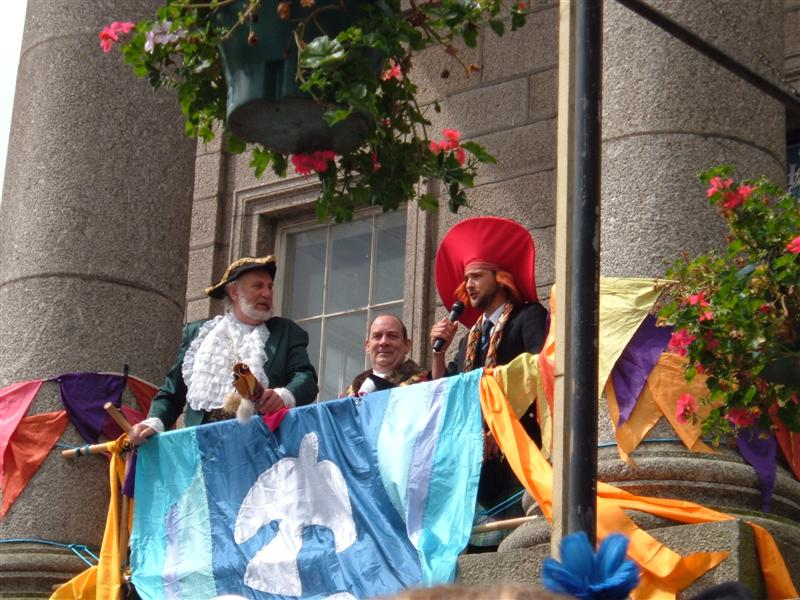
Mayor and Mock Mayor speeches at the modern Golowan Festival

The fire celebration and serpent dance at the revived Golowan Festival

The town's fiery midsummer festival was covered every year in the newspapers of the 19th century:

"No sooner had the tardy sun withdrawn himself from the horizon, then the young men began to assemble on several parts of the town, drawing after them, trees and branches of wood and furze; all which had been accumulating week after week, from the beginning of May. Tar barrels were presently erected on tall poles; some on the quay, others near the market, and one even on a rock in the midst of the sea; pretty female children tript up and down in their best frocks, decorated with garlands; and hailing the Midsummer-eve as the vigil of St. John.” (Royal Cornwall Gazette, 4 July 1801)

"Considerable discomfort was caused by the presence of bands of roughs who arm-in-arm rushed among the town knocking people down. The son of Mr Rogers, butcher, Market-jew-street, was knocked down and had his collar bone broken. No town in England, not even Exeter or Lewes now, can equal the scene presented by Penzance last night.” (Cornish Telegraph, 30 June 1880)

As the town and population of Penzance expanded during the mid to late 19th century, so did the number of bonfires and number of people making, lighting, and throwing fireworks. In the 1850s local bylaws were passed making it illegal to let off fireworks in the street. However, these were ignored. The Borough Magistrates's Petty Sessions as reported in the Cornish Telegraph of 8 July 1857 stated "The mere act of letting off fireworks in the town or highway is in itself a serious offence, and subjects the offender to a severe penalty, but that law, as far as Penzance is concerned, is pretty nearly an anomaly and on Midsummer and St Peter's Eves is set aside and fireworks are allowed by common consent on those evenings." The Gunpowder and Fireworks Act of 1860 required that fireworks manufacture, which was a cottage industry in Penzance in the months leading to Midsummer, required a licence. But this proved impossible to enforce. The 1875 Explosives Act made it an offence to let of fireworks in the street, and gave police power to issue substantial fines. By the early 1880s Midsummer Eve and St Peter's Eve had become particularly rowdy. In 1883 a 10pm curfew was enforced. In 1884 the Petty Sessions indicate that the police issued some substantial fines to some high-profile individuals. By 1885, the town was quiet in the evenings of Midsummer week, and what was effectively Penzance's fire festival had ended.

=== St Peter's Eve ===
Porthleven and Newlyn in particular being centres for much of the celebration of St Peter's-tide because of St Peter's role as the patron saint of fishermen. St Peter's-tide is still celebrated in Porthleven however in a far more muted fashion Porthleven Petertide. M. A. Courtney in her book Cornish Feasts and Feasten Customs describes a delay to the Newlyn festivities in 1883 when the majority of the Newlyn fishing fleet were at sea, returning to celebrate the fire festival many days after the actual event. Mevagissey feast which occurs around St Peter's Eve continues to be celebrated.

=== St Just ===
The people of St Just in Penwith had their own particular practices, Lake's Parochial history of Cornwall (1868) states:

On Midsummer-day, in modern times, the inhabitants, of this parish were greeted with sounds resembling the discharge of musketry in different directions, proceeding from holes bored in rocks, which being charged with powder were exploded in succession; and on the same day a new flag was displayed on every mine, and the night was ushered in with noisy festivities, and bonfires blazing on many of the hills.

A letter to the Cornishman in 1879 entitled "Midsummer at St Just" recalls memories of the Midsummer fair at St Just in the 1820s. Most of the town's inhabitants would visit Cape Cornwall for a fair where there were stalls selling fruit, biscuits, and beer. The account recalls the "grassy slopes along the Cape animated by the movements and mirth, the music and the laughter" and short boat trips out on the sea from Priest's Cove called a "troll" or "troyl".

== Similar festivals ==
Throughout Europe there are similar fire festivals held on 23 and 24 June. St. John's Eve in Ireland, Jāņi in Latvia and Saint Jonas' Festival are but a few examples. Golowan is just one example of a much wider Midsummer European tradition.

== Modern Golowan celebrations ==
The modern Golowan Festival in Penzance started in 1991 as an attempt to revive many of the traditions stated above. The core of the modern festival is long weekend which includes Mazey Eve, Mazey Day and Quay Fair Day. Thursday features a popular election of the 'Mayor of the Quay' and the Friday, Mazey Eve takes place around the harbour area of Penzance from where there is large firework display. The following day, Mazey Day, is a large community and arts celebration. Schools, entertainers, community groups and others take part in a series of processions that include music, giant sculptures and variety of other artistic activities. Contributions from musicians and artists from the Celtic nations are a regular feature as are a variety of other musical contributions. Penzance itself during this day is decorated with large amounts of greenery, mirroring the practice in the town during the ancient festival. A large number of market stalls are also present throughout the town. Mazey Day attracts thousands of visitors to the area and has become an important symbol of the identity of town amongst local people. Quay Fair Day is a celebration that is similar in many ways to 'Midsummer Fair' described in the ancient festival with the addition of popular street entertainment.

In October 2015 Penzance Town Council outsourced the running of the festival to a not-for-profit community interest company, which, having run the festival successfully from 2016 to 2019, has now been contracted to run the Festival until 2021.

=== Penglaz the Penzance 'Obby 'Oss ===
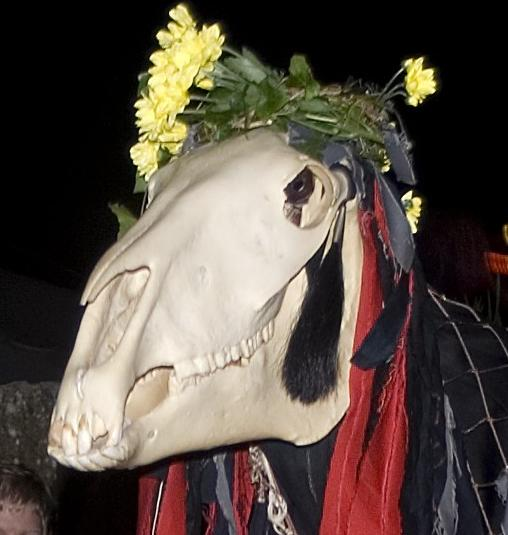
The modern Penglaz

During the evening of Mazey Eve and on 23 June (St John's Eve) every year Penglaz the Penzance 'Obby 'Oss appears. Penglaz owes its inspiration to the descriptions of the hobby horse that once accompanied the Christmas guise dancers in their perambulation of Penzance during the nineteenth century. The classic, contemporary account of the guise dancers' horse was given by Richard Edmonds who described the horse as being:

"represented by a man carrying a piece of wood in the form of a horse’s head and neck, with some contrivance for opening and shutting the mouth with a loud snapping noise, the performer being so covered with a horse cloth, or hide of a horse, as to resemble the animal whose curvettings, biting, and other motions, he imitated."

The horse was a character associated with 'Old Penglaze' in the guise dancers' games of forfeiture, described by William Sandys:

"Another essential character is Old Penglaze who has a blackened face and a staff in his hand, and a person girded round with a horse’s hide … to serve has his horse … The master then goes up to the delinqent and, taking up his foot, says: "Here is my seal, where is old Penglaze’s seal?” … Old Penglaze then comes in on his horse which winces and capers about grotesquely … The shoe of the "colt" is taken off and Penglaze gives him one or two hard blows on the sole of the foot, after which he rides off again, his horse capering more than ever before and sometimes throwing the old gentleman off."

Barbara Spooner in her 1958 article on the Padstow 'Obby 'Oss incorrectly described the 'Obby 'Oss associated with "Old Penglaze" as a "horse's skull held up on a stick by a hide covered or sheet-draped man" without checking the original source written by Richard Edmonds in 1846. Spooner's mistaken assumption about the horse's skull has inspired many skull-on-pole 'beasts' in Cornish folk culture since the creation of Golowan's Penglaz.

Robert Morton Nance expressed the view that "the May day games and Morris Dances, with their own type of hobby-horse, which includes a rider, had been brought in from England too recently to have acquired Cornish names". It became imperative amongst the Celtic Revivalists of the early twentieth century that the Tourney horse (with its rider) should be seen as English, or foreign, whereas the mast horses were to be understood as native, Celtic beasts, complete with Celtic names. In fact, as Edwin Cawte demonstrated in his study of British and European hobby horse practices, the mast type of horse developed during the eighteenth century and was particularly popular during the nineteenth, whereas the Tourney variety predated it by several centuries.

In his Cornish dictionary, Robert Morton Nance incorrectly believed the character of Old Penglaze to be the horse and believed that Penglaze was a genuine Celtic noun for a hobby horse, something one of the above-mentioned quotations contradicts. Moreover, the writer of Bewnans Meriasek, the life of St. Meriasek (or Meriadoc) of Camborne, writing in Cornish, understood the hobby horse as feminine in gender, whereas Penglaze is masculine, potentially undermining its status as an example of Cornish language.

The modern Golowan festival's Penglaz essentially takes its appearance from Barbara Spooner's mistaken 1958 description and resembles strongly the Mari Lwyd of Welsh tradition. Penglaz was first introduced in 1992 at the second revived Golowan festival by Merv Davey, honorary piper of Gorseth Kernow. The original horse now forms part of Cornish music group Pyba's Guise dance programme being renamed "Penguise". The current "Oss" was used for the first time in 1993 .

=== Old Cornwall Society ===
The ancient Golowan celebrations were also the inspiration for the Old Cornwall Societies' midsummer bonfire celebrations. The hilltop bonfires that form a chain are currently held at Kit Hill, St Breock beacon, Castle An Dinas, and Redruth.

== See also ==
- Montol Festival
- St. John's Eve
- Midsummer
- Allantide
- Furry Dance
- Tom Bawcock's Eve
- Guise dancing
- West Cornwall May Day celebrations
- Halloween
- Feast of Saints Peter and Paul
- St Peter's Eve
