= Lescudjack Hill Fort =

Iron Age hillfort in Cornwall, England

- Kastel Nanskosek
- The site of Lescudjack Hill Fort, Penzance, Cornwall looking northwest

- Location within Southwest Cornwall

General information
- Location: Penzance, Cornwall, England
- Coordinates: 50°7′30″N 5°31′59″W
- Landlord: Penwith District Council and Penzance Town Council

The site of Lescudjack Hill Fort, Penzance, Cornwall looking south towards Mount's Bay

Lescudjack Hill fort (Cornish: Kastel Nanskosek) is the name given to the unexcavated Iron Age settlement located in Penzance, Cornwall. It is positioned on the summit of a steep hill in the east of Penzance and consists of a single rampart enclosing an area of 3 acres (12,000 m^{2}). The site has been damaged and contains allotments and an open area of land which has recently been cleared of thick undergrowth. It is reported that a small lead-copper mine was situated "just outside" the ramparts, however all trace of this appears to have vanished.

In 2004 this land was purchased by Penwith District Council and Penzance Town Council for £45,000 following a series of campaigns in the local community including a campaign conducted by the then Lescudjack Infants School (now part of the Pensans Primary School). According to Penwith District Council's website, a full archaeological survey is being conducted by Cornwall County Council's Historic Environment Service . The site is also subject to a management plan jointly agreed by Penzance Town Council and Penwith District Council.

The site traditionally was referred to as a castle and Castle Road which runs alongside the site was named after it. There are also several roads nearby named Lescudjack, two schools have used the name and the local Sure Start is called Lescudjack.

The hill fort was formally handed over to public use on 21 December 2007 as part of the Montol Festival.

The fort's name originates from the Cornish words "nans" (valley) and "cosek" (wooded); but compare: "lesky" (to burn), "cunnys" (fuel) and "ack" (a place where found) for "LESKInnick" terrace which is just below on the west side of the hill; therefore that could mean a "beacon place".
