= Margaret Ann Courtney =

English poet and folklorist

Margaret Ann Courtney (16 April 1834 – 12 May 1920) was a Cornish poet and folklorist based in Penzance, Cornwall.

== Family life ==
Margaret Ann Courtney was born at Penzance in 1834, the eldest daughter of Sarah Mortimer Courtney and John Sampson Courtney. Her mother was from Scilly; her father from Devon. One brother, John Mortimer Courtney, was a government official in Canada; another, Leonard Henry Courtney, was a British politician. Her younger sister Louise d'Este Courtney married Richard Oliver, a New Zealand politician from Cornwall.

== Publications ==
M. A. Courtney is perhaps best known for her book Cornish Feasts and Folk-Lore (1890), a detailed description of many of the traditions and folklore present in west Cornwall. It has also appeared under the title Folklore and Legends of Cornwall. Other titles by Courtney included Cornish Feasts and Feasten Times (1910) and Glossary of Words in Use in Cornwall (1880, co-authored with Dr. Thomas Quiller Couch).

A poem by Margaret Ann Courtney was included in the 2000 collection Voices from West Barbary: an anthology of Anglo-Cornish poetry 1549-1928.

== See also ==
- West Cornwall May Day celebrations
- Allantide
- Golowan
- Guise dancing
