= Calan Gaeaf =

Ancient Welsh festival

Calan Gaeaf is the name of the first day of winter in Wales, observed on 1 November. The night before is Nos Galan Gaeaf or Noson Galan Gaeaf, an Ysbrydnos ('spirit night') when spirits are abroad. Traditionally, people avoid churchyards, stiles, and crossroads, since spirits are thought to gather there. The term is first recorded in literature as "Kalan Gayaf" in the laws of Hywel Dda.

The same term, Kalan Gwav, is found in the Cornish language, and Kalan Goañv in Breton.

== Traditions ==
=== Dancing ===
On Nos Calan Gaeaf, women and children would dance around a bonfire and everyone would write their names on, or otherwise mark, rocks and place them in and around said fire. When the fire started to die out, they would all run home, believing if they stayed, Yr Hwch Ddu Gwta (a bad omen that took the form of a tailless black sow with a headless woman) or Y Ladi Wen ("the white lady", a ghostly apparition often said to be headless) would chase them or devour their souls.

One particular rhyme shows how the last child out on Nos Calan Gaeaf was at risk of being eaten by the fearsome beast:

| Original | English |
|---|---|
| Adref, adref, am y cyntaf', Hwch ddu gwta a gipio'r ola'. | Home, home, at once The tailless black sow shall snatch the last [one]. |

The following morning, all the stones containing villagers' names would be checked, and finding one's stone burned clean was believed to be good luck. If, however, a stone was missing, the person who wrote their name on the absent stone would be believed to die within one year.

=== Harvest mare ===
Calan Gaeaf is a harvest festival and many games would be played involving the harvest. When the last corn stalk was harvested, workers would leave a few stalks uncut and then play a game with the uncut stalks to see who could reap them. Once the final corn stalks were cut, the stalks were twisted into something called a "harvest mare." The winner would stuff the harvest mare inside his clothing and try to sneak it into the house while the women worked on the feast. If the reaper successfully got the harvest mare into the house, he was rewarded. If he was unsuccessful, he was mocked.

=== Feast ===
After the harvest was gathered and the livestock was slaughtered, a large feast would be held that was cooked by all the women in the village.

=== Seeing the future ===
- The boys were instructed to cut 10 leaves of ivy, throw one away and put the other nine under their pillows. Apparently, this allowed the boys to see the future, and if they touched the ivy then they could see witches while asleep.
- The girls were instructed to grow a rose in the shape of a large hoop, go through the circle three times prior to cutting a rose, and then place the rose under their pillow. This allowed the girls to see into the future.
- Unmarried women were instructed to darken their rooms during Nos Calan Gaeaf, and then an unmarried woman could look into the mirror to see the face of the future groom. If a skull appeared in the mirror, the unmarried woman was meant to die within the year. If a future groom could not be seen, unmarried women were instructed to peel an apple and throw the skin over their shoulders. Apparently, the shape the apple skin made would show the first initial of her future husband.

=== Terms ===
- Coelcerth: A bonfire. This fire was often used as part of the tradition wherein families place stones with their names on it in the fire, and search for their stone in the ashes the next day. Any person whose stone is missing the next morning would die within the year.
- Yr Hwch Ddu Gwta: A fearsome spirit in the form of a tail-less black sow who roamed the countryside with a headless woman.
- Twco Fala: Apple bobbing
- Caseg Fedi: Harvest mare

== See also ==
- Samhain
- Halloween
- Day of the Dead
- Allantide
- Dziady
- Winter Nights

== Bibliography ==
- "Halloween Traditions". Museum Wales.
- Davies, John (2008). The Welsh Academy Encyclopaedia of Wales. Cardiff: University of Wales Press. ISBN 978-0-7083-1953-6.
- Jones, T. Gwynn (Thomas Gwynn) (1930). Welsh folklore and folk-custom. Cambridge : Brewer. ISBN 978-0-85991-056-9.
- Phillips, Alan Robert (2016). "Cynhaeaf: Customs, Practices and Folklore associated with the Traditional Harvest in Wales" (PDF).
- Cambrian register. Volume 2, 1796. [London] : [publisher not identified]. 1796.
