= Crying the Neck =

Harvest ritual in the United Kingdom

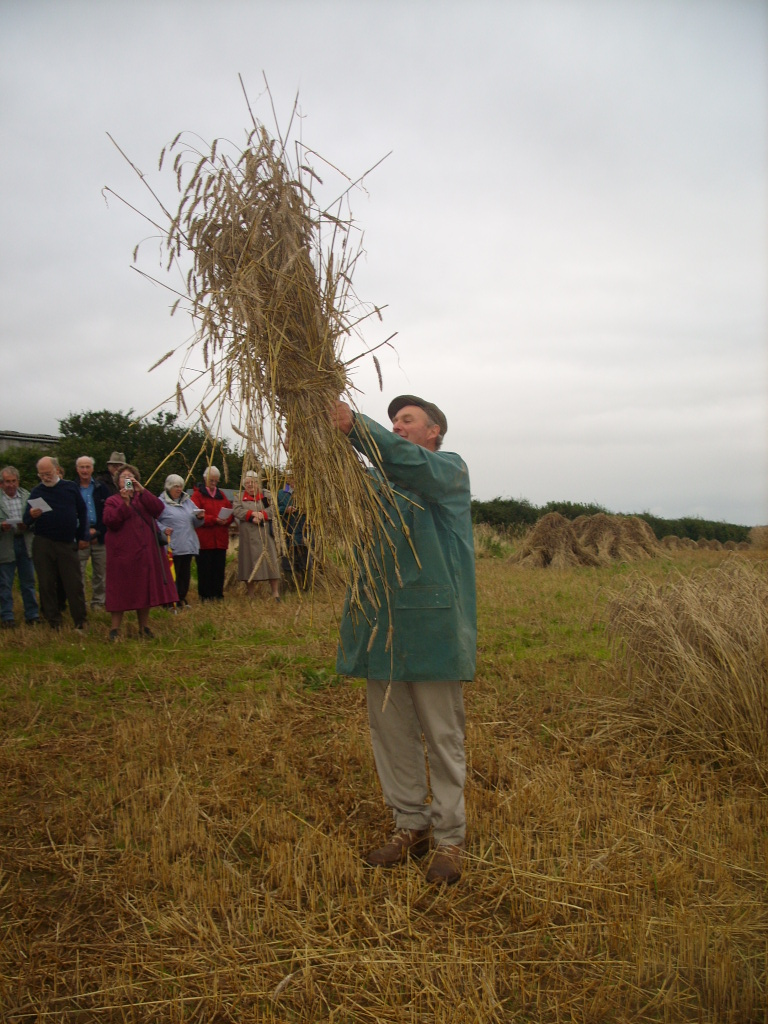
'Crying The Neck' at St Columb Major (2008).

Crying the Neck is a harvest festival tradition once common in counties of Devon and Cornwall in the United Kingdom, in which a farm worker holds aloft the final handful of cut corn and a series of calls are chanted.

The tradition declined following the invention of machines such as the combine harvester, but despite this has persisted into modern times across Devon and Cornwall albeit to a more limited extent. In Devon the tradition was still recorded as occurring regularly on the Exmoor coast in 1950, and more recently has seen reintroduction elsewhere such as Stoke where it occurs annually alongside the Village Summer Fair. In Cornwall there was an organised revival of the practice on five farms in the 20 years after the Second World War by the Old Cornwall Society, which still organises most events where the tradition is practised to this day.

== Ceremony ==
In The Story of Cornwall, by Kenneth Hamilton Jenkin, the following explanation is given on the practice:

"In those days the whole of the reaping had to be done either with the hook or scythe. The harvest, in consequence, often lasted for many weeks. When the time came to cut the last handful of standing corn, one of the reapers would lift up the bunch high above his head and call out in a loud voice.....,

"I 'ave 'un! I 'ave 'un! I 'ave 'un!"

The rest would then shout,

"What 'ave 'ee? What 'ave 'ee? What 'ave 'ee?"

and the reply would be:

"A neck! A neck! A neck!"

Everyone then joined in shouting:

"Hurrah! Hurrah for the neck! Hurrah for Mr. So-and-So"

(calling the farmer by name.)"

Sometimes the ceremony is given in the Cornish Language, here between An Tregher (the reaper) and An Re erel (the others):

An Tregher: "Yma genef! Yma genef! Yma genef!"
An Re erel: "Pandr’us genes? Pandr’us genes? Pandr’us genes?"
An Tregher: "Pen Yar! Pen Yar! Pen Yar!"
An Re erel: "An Re erel – “Houra! Houra! Houra!"

Robert Hunt wrote in his Popular Romances of the West of England that the neck would be hung in the farmhouse after the ceremony.

== Modern popular culture ==
In a harvest scene in the third episode of the second series of the 2015 of Poldark, Francis Poldark performs the tradition at Trenwith, his estate.

In a harvest scene in the third episode of supernatural drama The Living and the Dead (S01 E03), Charlotte Appleby performs the tradition at her husband's family farm, which she manages.

== See also ==
- Harvest festival
- Guldize
