= Mock mayor =

British folk tradition

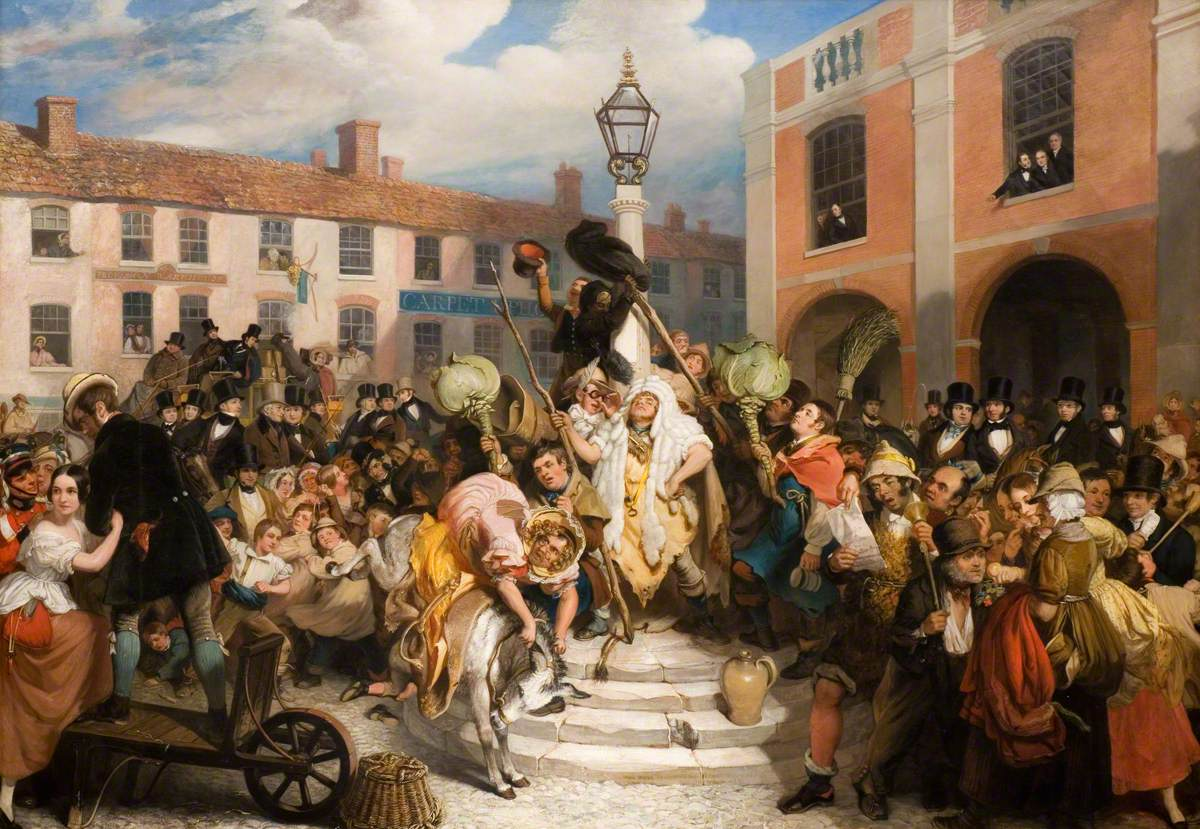
The Mock Mayor by Robert William Buss (1804–1875). Brampton Museum, Newcastle-under-Lyme.

The election of a mock mayor is British folk tradition found in a number of communities throughout the British Isles. A mock mayor is an individual who is elected by a popular informal assembly of individuals as a parody of the official office of mayor in any given community.

== Examples ==
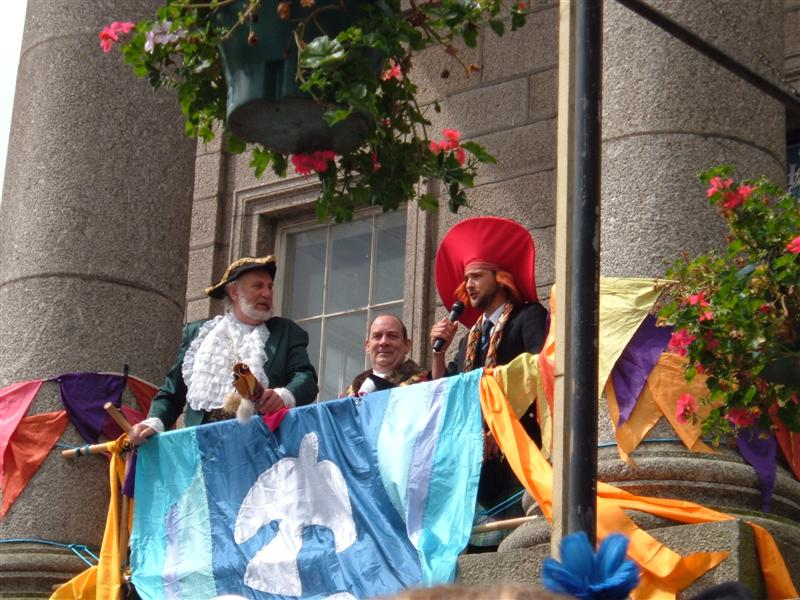
The mock mayor at the modern Golowan Festival in 2005

Examples may be found in:

=== Cornwall ===
- Helston (known as the Mayor of St Johns)
- Mylor
- Penzance, as part of the Golowan Festival
- Penryn
- Polperro
- St Germans

=== Elsewhere ===
- Abingdon-on-Thames, Oxfordshire. (Known as the Mayor of Ock Street)
- Barton, Gloucestershire.
- Llansteffan, Wales.
- Newcastle-under-Lyme, Staffordshire.
- Woodstock, Oxfordshire.

== See also ==
- Lord of Misrule
- Mummers' play
- Non-human electoral candidate
- List of animals in political office
- Novelty candidate
