= Montol Festival =

Annual festival in the United Kingdom

The Montol Festival (often just Montol) is an annual festival in Penzance, Cornwall, England, United Kingdom, which has been held on 21 December each year since 2007. The festival is a revival or reinterpretation of many of the traditional Cornish midwinter customs & Christmas traditions formerly practiced in and around the Penzance area and common to much of Cornwall at one point. The festival spans several days, but the main events are held on the traditional date of the feast of St Thomas the Apostle, usually 21 December, which always coincides with the winter solstice.

== Origin and history ==
Montol came about from the same community which had created Golowan, a midsummer festival also held in Penzance, though different people were involved. The idea was formed after the success of Golowan, in order to celebrate the winter solstice in a similar manner. Montol sought to revive practices recorded by antiquarians, some of which reportedly only died out after the Second World War. The first festival was in 2007 and was initially funded by grants from central government.

The festival was cancelled in 2020 due to the COVID-19 pandemic.

=== Name origin ===
Edward Lhuyd, in his 1700 MSS of vocabulary in the Cornish language, states that Montol means 'winter solstice'. However, he later translates the word as 'balance' (in Latin, Trutina – 'a set of scales').

== Revived customs ==
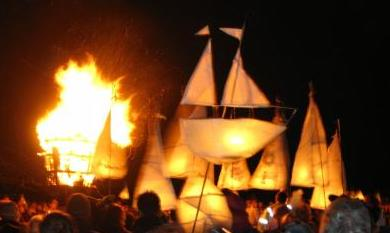
The 2007 Montol beacon at Lescudjack Hillfort

Montol is not based on a particular historical festival, but rather incorporates many different recorded customs.

The festival centres around Montol Eve (21 December) and several revived traditions of West Cornwall including, most predominantly, guise dancing. Guise dancing is a Cornish custom in which people dress up in costumes and masks and play music, dance, sing and take part in parades, somewhat similar to mummering elsewhere in England. During the evening large guiser processions can be seen through the town, carrying lanterns, wearing masks and traditional costumes. Early in the evening a Lord of Misrule is chosen from among the masked revellers by the drawing of coloured beans. The Lord of Misrule leads the main processions and has certain honorary functions, although there is no historical basis for this part of the event prior to 2007.

Since 2010, Pen Hood (the Montol Obby Oss) and Penglaz (the Golowan Obby Oss) appear later on, leading parades and revelling, with the evening culminating in the ceremony of the "Chalking of the Mock". The Mock is a Cornish Yule Log, which is marked with a stick figure and then burnt on the Montol bonfire. In the early years of the festival, the bonfire was a beacon was lit at Lescudjack Hill Fort, in a similar vein to the beacons lit by the Old Cornwall Society at midsummer. More recently, the bonfire has been held at the Princess May Recreation Ground, opposite Humphry Davy School.

Other customs include the Cornish candle dance (a dance around a basket full of lit, brightly-coloured candles), and the performance of traditional Guisers plays such as St George and the Turkish Knight or Buffy and the Bucca. Cornish Christmas carols also feature during the festivities.

=== Historical basis ===
The historical basis for many of the customs described above is taken from the texts of notable Cornish antiquarians and contemporary research into the subject. A. K. Hamilton Jenkin in his book Cornish Homes and Customs describes the Guise dance processions and performances of 1831 as "like an Italian carnival" and further noted that "everyone including the rich and the great came masked and disguised on to the streets".

A detailed description of the Penzance Guise dancers is given by William Bottrell in his book Traditions and Hearthside Stories of West Cornwall (1870–80):

During the early part of the last century the costume of the guise dancers often consisted of such antique finery as would now raise envy in the heart of a collector. The chief glory of the men lay in their cocked hats which were surmounted with plumes and decked with streamers and ribbons. The girls were no less magnificently attired with steeple crowned hats, stiff bodied gowns, bag skirts or trains and ruffles hanging from their elbows.

== Community events ==
The festival often includes community-oriented events such as public music, a series of workshops dedicated to the making of masks and costumes so people can join in with guise parades, community carol services, and a troyl.

== See also ==
- Golowan Festival
- Tom Bawcock's Eve
- Mari Lwyd
