= A. K. Hamilton Jenkin =

British historian (1900–1980)

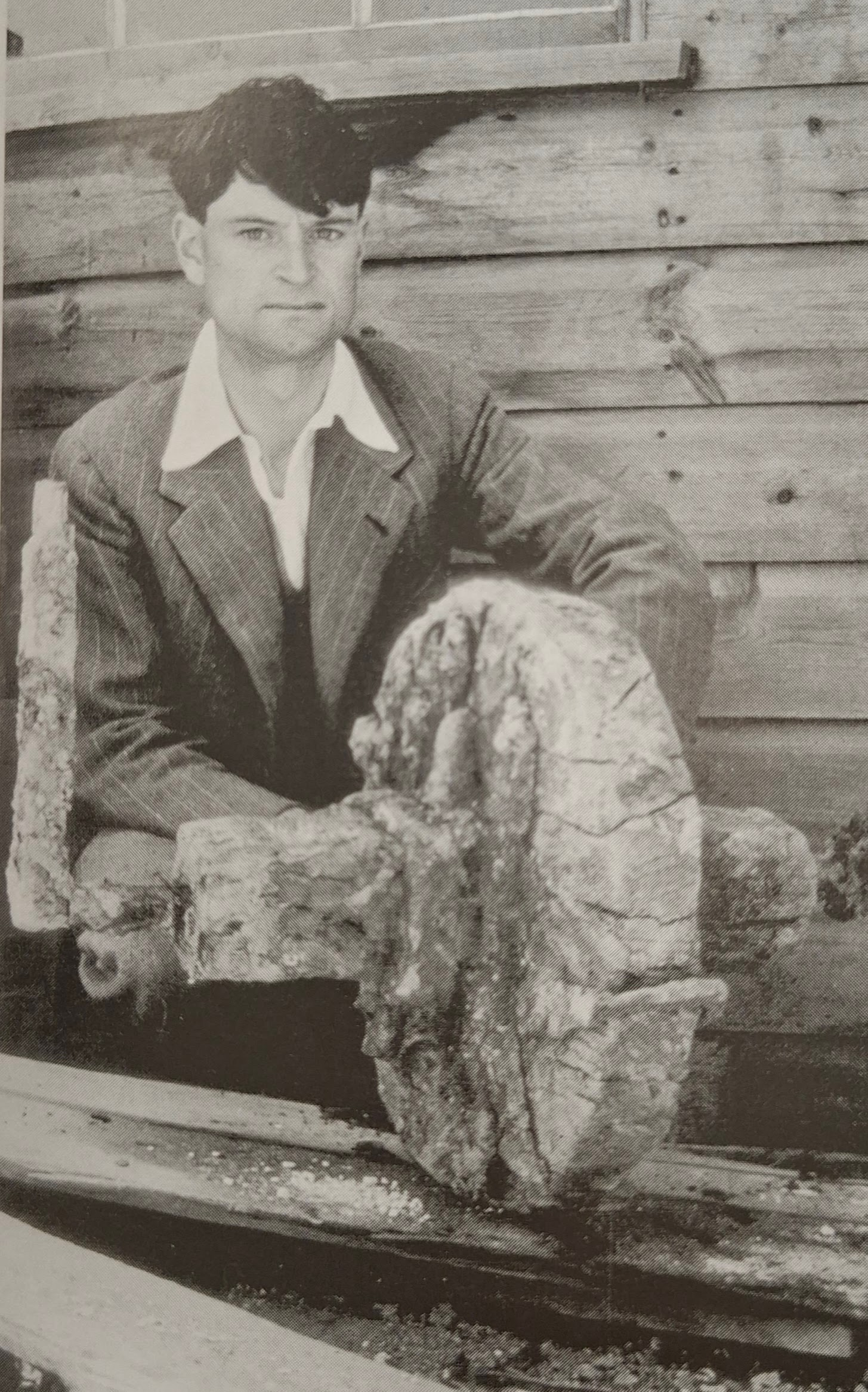
- A.K Hamilton Jenkin in front of a Rag and Chain pump wheel at Wheal Reeth, Germoe. 1929
- Born: Alfred Kenneth Hamilton Jenkin; 29 October 1900; Redruth, Cornwall
- Died: 20 August 1980 (aged 79); Treliske Hospital, Truro
- Occupations: Author, Historian

Alfred Kenneth Hamilton Jenkin FSA (29 October 1900 – 20 August 1980) was a Cornish bard and historian with a particular interest in Cornish mining, publishing The Cornish Miner, now a classic, in 1927.

== Birth and education ==
He was born in Redruth on 29 October 1900, the son of Alfred Hamilton Jenkin, and his wife, Amy Louisa Keep. He attended University College, Oxford, where in 1919 he became a friend of the famous author, C.S. Lewis: both were members of the Martlets Literary Society. He graduated as M.A. and B.Litt. at the University of Oxford.

== Cornish activities ==
Jenkin was a founder bard of the Gorseth Kernow in 1928, taking the bardic name Lef Stenoryon ('Voice of the Tinners'). He was involved in persuading Cornwall County Council to set up Cornwall Record Office in the 1950s, and served on its committee until his death. In 1959 he was elected President of the Federation of Old Cornwall Societies, a position he also held in 1960 and in 1962 he became its first life President.

He was elected President of the Royal Institution of Cornwall for the years 1958, 1959 and was vice-president in 1977.

== Recognition as a historian ==
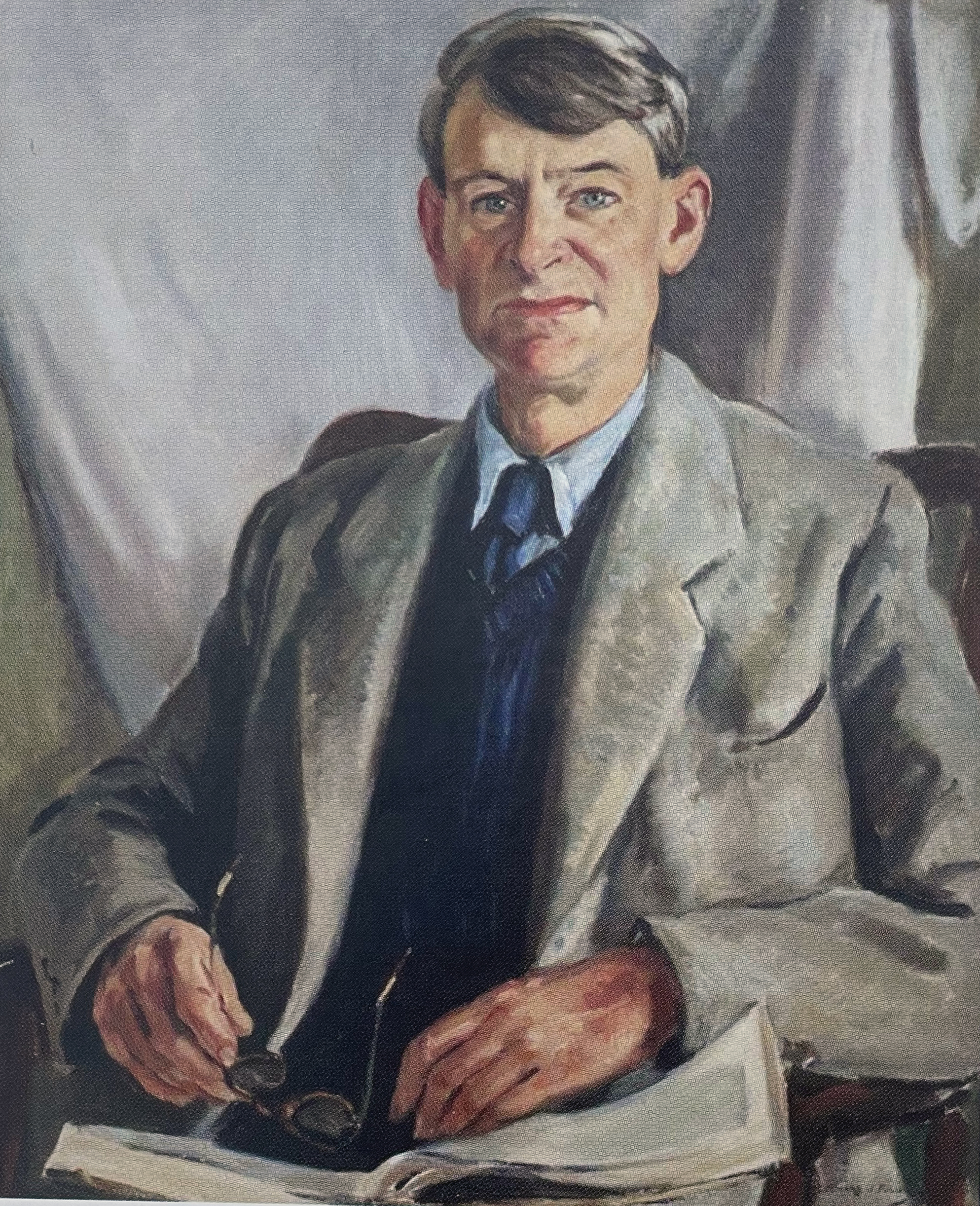
Portrait of A K Hamilton Jenkin by Leonard Fuller in the Cornish Studies Library collection.

In 1954 he was elected a Fellow of the Society of Antiquaries and was awarded his honorary degree of Doctor of Letters by the University of Exeter in 1978.

== Personal life ==
He married Luned Marion Jacobs (2nd daughter of W. W. Jacobs, the famous humourist) and had two daughters: Jennifer Hamilton Jenkin and Honor Bronwen Jenkin. The marriage ended in divorce and his second marriage was to Elizabeth Lenton.

== Death ==
He died 20 August 1980 at Treliske Hospital, Truro

== Publications ==
- "Boulton and Watt in Cornwall" in Royal Cornwall Polytechnic Society Annual Report, 1926
- The Cornish Miner: an Account of his Life Above and Underground from Early Times. London: George Allen & Unwin, 1927: three editions, including 3rd edition, 1962 (reprinted by David & Charles, Newton Abbot, 1972 ISBN 0-7153-5486-8; reprinted in facsimile with an introduction by John H. Trounson, Launceston: Westcountry, 2004 ISBN 1-902395-06-9)
- "The Nationalisation of West-Country Minerals". (New Fabian Research Bureau. Publications series; no. 3) 17 pages. [London, 1932]
- Cornish Seafarers: the Smuggling, Wrecking and Fishing Life of Cornwall. London: J. M. Dent, 1932
- Cornwall and Its People: being a new impression of the composite work.... London: J. M. Dent, 1945 (reprinted 1970 by David & Charles, Newton Abbot ISBN 0-7153-4702-0) including:
  - "Cornish Seafarers", 1932
  - "Cornwall and the Cornish: the story, religion and folk-lore of ’The Western Land’", 1933
  - "Cornish homes and customs", 1934
- Cornwall and the Cornish: the story, religion and folk-lore of ’The Western Land’, London: J. Dent, 1933
- Cornish Homes and Customs. London: J. M. Dent, 1934
- The Story of Cornwall. London: Thomas Nelson, 1934 (reprinted by D. Bradford Barton, Truro, 1962)
- The Western Land. London: Great Western Railway, 1937
- News from Cornwall. London: Westaway Books, 1946
- News from Cornwall, edited, with a memoir of William Jenkin, by A. K. Hamilton Jenkin. 1951
- Mines and Miners of Cornwall in 16 volumes, vols. 1–14 originally published by the Truro Bookshop, 1961 onwards and reprinted by various organisations:
  - Pt. I. Around St. Ives ISBN 0-904662-04-7
  - Pt. II. St. Agnes, Perranporth ISBN 0-904662-05-5
  - Pt. III. Around Redruth ISBN 0-904662-06-3
  - Pt. IV. Penzance-Mount's Bay ISBN 0-904662-08-X
  - Pt. V. Hayle, Gwinear and Gwithian ISBN 0-904662-10-1
  - Pt. VI. Around Gwennap ISBN 0-904662-11-X
  - Pt. VII. Perranporth-Newquay
  - Pt. VIII. Truro to the clay district
  - Pt. IX. Padstow, St Columb and Bodmin
  - Pt. X. Camborne and Illogan
  - Pt. XI. Marazion, St Hilary and Breage
  - Pt. XII. Liskeard area
  - Pt. XIII. The Lizard-Falmouth-Mevagissey
  - Pt. XIV. St Austell to Saltash
  - Pt. XV. Calstock, Callington and Launceston Penzance: Federation of Old Cornwall Societies, 1969 (reprinted Bracknell: Forge Books, 1976) ISBN 0-902660-00-4
  - Pt. XVI. Wadebridge, Camelford and Bude Penzance: Federation of Old Cornwall Societies, 1970
  - Index to Mines and Miners of Cornwall: Volumes 1–16. St. Austell: Federation of Old Cornwall Societies, 1978
- Mines of Devon. Newton Abbot: David & Charles, 1974
  - Volume 1: South Devon ISBN 0-7153-6784-6
  - Volume 2: Mines of Devon, north and east of Dartmoor: Sydenham Damerel, Lydford, Wheal Betsy, Wheal Friendship, Okehampton, Sticklepath, Chagford, Buckfastleigh, Ashburton, Ilsington, Teign Valley, Newton St. Cyres, and Upton Pyne. (Reprinted by Devon Libraries 1981 ISBN 0-86114-317-5)
  - Both volumes reprinted by Landmark, 2005 ISBN 1-84306-174-0
- Wendron Tin (commissioned by Poldark Mine), 1978
