= William Bottrell =

English folklorist (1816–1881)

William Bottrell (1816–1881) was born at Rafta, St Levan in Cornwall on 7 March 1816. He contributed greatly to the preservation of Cornish mythology. Both he and Thomas Quiller Couch contributed folk stories of West Cornwall for Robert Hunt's Popular Romances of the West of England, published in 1865.

Although Bottrell's contributions were acknowledged in Hunt's introduction to the book (his name given there as Botterell), there was no individual acknowledgement for each story, which was the case for Couch's contributions. The "Cornish Telegraph" invited Bottrell to write his own versions for their newspaper. These were published between 1867 and 1869 and then published as Traditions and Hearthside Stories of West Cornwall in 1870.

Hunt and Bottrell were both intent on preserving the old legends but Bottrell's stories were generally much longer than similar versions published by Hunt, reflecting the way the old story tellers, known as "droll tellers", embellished the basic tales to increase the entertainment value.

A second series of Traditions and Hearthside Stories of West Cornwall was published in 1873, included the first recorded version of the Mermaid of Zennor. In 1880, a third series was in preparation when Bottrell had a stroke that left him unable to write. A shorter than intended volume was completed as Stories and Folk-Lore of West Cornwall with a preface by Rev. W. S. Lach-Szyrma, which included much that had been previously published. Bottrell died in St Ives on 27 August 1881 and was buried in St Levan churchyard.

== Life ==
William Bottrell was an only child, born on March 7th, 1816 to William Vingoe Bottrell and Margaret Bosence. He grew up in Cornwall, England. Where he was baptized at 20 days old in the St. Levan Church. William in his early years worked on the family farm, along with attending the local grammar school. He would later be sent away to Bodmin Boarding School.

After leaving the school he would travel the world, eventually buying land in Spain, specifically in Basque country. During this time it is known that he would gather folktales and stories. He would move back to Cornwall and then to Canada after the Catholic Church seized his land in Spain. In Canada he held two jobs, first as an English Teacher, later leaving the school and becoming an overseer for a timber company. Later on he would move back home and meet his wife, after their marriage they would move to Australia.

Not much is known about his time in Australia though, he would move back to Cornwall following his fathers death. Where he would work as a miner, befriending many of his coworkers. They would share tales amongst each other, these drolls and stories he would later share with Robert Hunt. Who makes these stories immortal sharing them in his own works. After being advised by a local reporter, Bottrell would publish his own work in a newspaper and later books. He would gather fame in this later part of his life due to these publications. He would consistently publish in a local newspaper and two books before he had a stroke.

Before he could finish his third and final volume he would have a stroke. With partial paralysis he could still speak and would still publish works to the newspaper. Though not making much more ground on the final volume of his three book series, it would be published earlier than he wanted, resulting in a shorter third volume. William would have another stroke becoming fully paralyzed, he passed a couple months later on the 27th of August 1881. He would be buried at St. Levan Church, the same church he was baptized in when he was young.
