= Furry Dance =

Traditional British floral dance

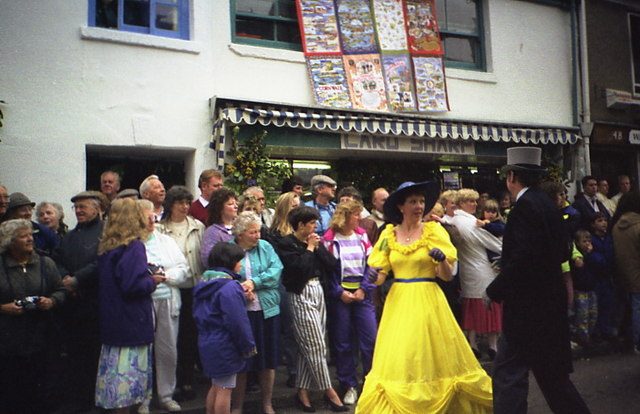
The Midday Dance, Flora Day, Helston, 1993

The Furry Dance (/ˈfʌri/ FUH-ree) is a celebration of the passing of winter and the arrival of spring, and one of the oldest British customs still practised today. Traditionally held on 8 May, it is held in Helston, Cornwall, where dancers wear lily of the valley, the town's symbolic flower. The name probably derives from Cornish fer meaning "fair, feast" referencing the celebration on 8 May of the Apparition of the Archangel Michael at Monte Gargano, Italy, Helston's patron saint.

== Origin ==
The most famous Furry Dance takes place in Helston, Cornwall, United Kingdom. It is one of the oldest British customs still practised today. The earliest mention seems to be in a letter to the Gentleman's Magazine for 1790 where the writer says "At Helstone, a genteel and populus borough town in Cornwall, it is customary to dedicate the 8th May to revelry (festive mirth, not loose jollity). It is called Furry Day". The dance is very well attended every year and people travel from all over the world to see it: Helston Town Band play all the music for the dances.

The Furry Dance takes place every year on 8 May (except when the date falls on a Sunday or Monday — Monday being Market Day — when it is the preceding Saturday). In Helston, 8 May, the Apparition of Saint Michael, the Archangel Michael of Christianity, is called Flora Day, and the term furry probably derives from the Cornish language: fer, "fair, feast". It is a celebration of the passing of winter and the arrival of spring. The schedule of the day is thus: morning dance at 7 a.m., the first performance of the Hal-an-Tow pageant at 8:30 a.m. with the last completed by 9:30 a.m., children's dance traditionally at 10 a.m. though in recent years the numbers and logistics have seen this advanced to 9.50 a.m. and in 2016 to 9.40 a.m., midday dance at noon, and evening dance at 5 p.m.. Of these, the midday dance is perhaps the best known: it was traditionally the dance of the gentry in the town, and today the men wear top hats and tails while the women dance in their finest frocks.

Traditionally, the dancers wear lily of the valley, which is Helston's symbolic flower. The gentlemen wear it on the left, with the flowers pointing upwards, and the ladies wear it upside down on the right. Lily of the valley is worn on Flora Day by dancers, bandsmen, Flora Day stewards and by those who are "Helston-born".

== Children's dance ==
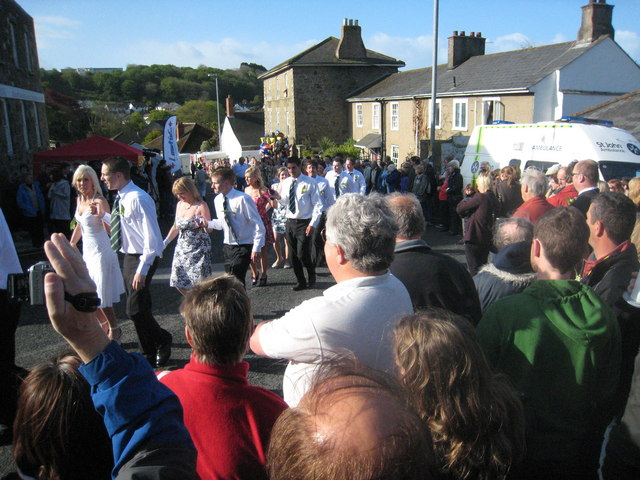
Coinagehall Street, Helston, 2009

The children's dance involves over 1,000 children aged from 7 to 18, all dressed in white, the boys with lily of the valley buttonholes and the girls wearing flowers in their hair, the flower determined by the school they attend. They come from St Michael's School, Nansloe School, Parc Eglos School, and Helston Community College: each year a different school leads the dance.

All the boys wear white clothing, with the only colour being their school ties, and the girls (also in white) wear matching coloured head-dress flowers (blue cornflowers for St Michael's, forget-me-nots for Helston Community College, daisies for Nansloe and poppies and buttercups for Parc Eglos) in their hair.

The girls wear white dresses following the school rules and boys white shirt and trousers or shorts. They all dance around Helston town, with the band playing the accompanying music.

== Pageant ==
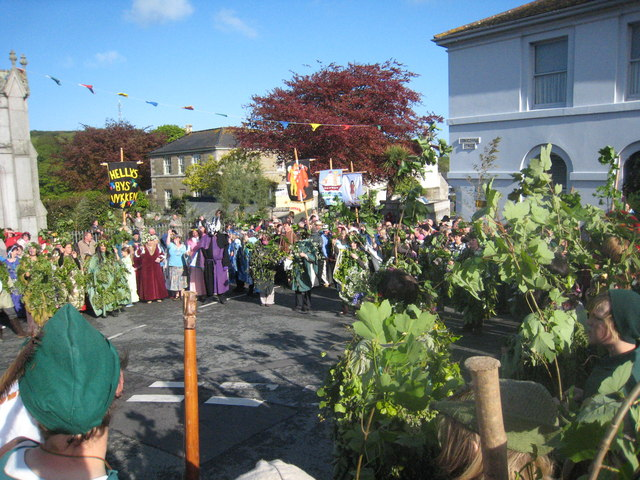
The Hal-an-Tow in Coinagehall Street

The Hal-an-Tow, which takes place on the same day, is a kind of mystery play with various historical and mythical themes. The Hal-an-Tow Pageant starts at St John's Bridge and is performed at seven locations around the town. Characters include Friar Tuck, Robin Hood, Saint George, and Saint Michael. The Hal-an-Tow song welcomes the coming of summer. It contains disparaging references to the Spaniards, probably referring to the Spanish raid on Newlyn in 1595. The Helston Furry Dance is number 135 in Roy Palmer's Everyman's Book of English Country Songs.

The meaning of Hal-an-Tow is unclear. The word kalan means the first of the month in Cornish, but the first letter mutates to an "h" in some circumstances. It has been suggested that "tow" means garland in Cornish. This is not correct, though "tosow" means tufts, tassles, or bunches. Some have suggested that Hal-an-Tow means "raise the roof". In Helston tow is pronounced to rhyme with cow and not toe. The Cornish word "tew" means fat, and a recent explanation of the name is that Hal-an-Tow means the eve of the fattening time. The version of the Hal-an-Tow sung by The Watersons and other folk groups has never been sung in Helston. The Helston song does not include the verse about cuckolds and horns. These words appear to have been added from Shakespeare's play As You Like It by Mike Waterson, and this version must be later than 1954. The original song was recorded in Sabine Baring-Gould's Songs of the West (which contains errors) and the versions in Canow Kernow edited by Inglis Gundry, such as the one recorded by William Sandys in 1846. The words of the Hal-an-Tow as it is currently sung in Helston are:

Chorus:
Hal-an-tow, jolly rumble, O.
For we are up as soon as any day, O
And for to fetch the Summer home,
The Summer and the May, O
For Summer is a-come, O,
And Winter is a-gone, O.

Robin Hood and Little John,
They both are gone to fair, O
And we will to the merry green wood
To see what they do there, O
And for to chase, O
To chase the buck and doe.

Chorus

Where are those Spaniards
That make so great a boast, O?
For they shall eat the grey goose feather
And we will eat the roast, O
In every land, O
The land where-e'er we go.

Chorus

St Piran showed his care for us
And all our sons and daughters, O
He brought the book of Christendom
Across the western waters, O
And taught the love of Heaven above
For Cornishmen below.

Chorus

As for that good knight, St George
St George he was a knight, O
Of all the knights in Christendom
St George he is the right, O
In every land, O
The land where-e'er we go.

Chorus

But to a greater than St George
Our Helston has a right, O
St Michael with his wings outspread,
The archangel so bright, O
Who fought the fiend, O
Of all mankind the foe.

Chorus

God bless Aunt Mary Moses
And all her power and might, O
And send us peace in merry England
Both day and night, O.
And send us peace in merry England
Both now and ever more, O.

Chorus

The verse about Saint Michael was added in the 1930s by Robert Morton Nance. The Saint Piran verse was added in 2005. The Aunt Mary Moses verse is only performed at the first location, at St John's Bridge, and the last location, by Helston Guildhall.

== Music ==
The music is provided by Helston Town Band, augmented by members of other local bands. They play from memory, as it is suggested that the music for the dance has never been written down. However it was at various times, such as by Davies Gilbert in 1823. In 1890 Cornish antiquarian Margaret Ann Courtney wrote that the tune was sometimes known as "John the Bone". the following rhyme often being attached to the tune by local children,

John the Bone was walking home,
When he met with Sally Dover,
He kissed her once,
He kissed her twice,
And kissed her three times over.

The BBC recorded the band playing for the dance on 8 May 1943 and this recording is included in The Voice of the People vol. 16: You lazy lot of bone-shakers, issued by Topic Records in 1998.

=== "The Floral Dance" ===
In 1911 Katie Moss, a London composer visiting Helston, observed the Furry Dance and joined in the dancing herself in the evening. On the train home she wrote words and music of a song about her experience, calling the song "The Floral Dance". She quotes the Furry Dance tune in the piano accompaniment to the chorus – though altering the melody in two bars.

This song was soon published by Chappell & Co., and first performed by baritone Thorpe Bates the same year. The first recording was made by Peter Dawson on the Zonophone label in 1912. It has since been recorded by many other artists. A bass baritone version of the song was recorded by Inia Te Wiata and was released posthumously in a collection called "Just call me Happy".

In 1976 the Brighouse and Rastrick Brass Band recorded an arrangement of the Moss song made by their musical director Derek Broadbent. By Christmas 1977 half a million copies of the record had been sold, and it was only kept from the top position in the Christmas charts by Paul McCartney's "Mull of Kintyre". In January 1978 a vocal version by Terry Wogan accompanied by the Hanwell Band reached number 21 on the UK singles chart. Wogan did not include the last verse (the climax of the story) in this recording.

== Similar customs ==
Similar customs can be found in, amongst other places, Biewer, a district of Trier, Germany, where the annual "Schärensprung" takes place and in Echternach, Luxembourg. There are also similarities with the 'Obby 'Oss festival in Padstow, Cornwall, and with similar events in Minehead, Somerset, and Lympstone and Combe Martin in Devon. A Flora Dance takes place through the narrow streets of Fowey, Cornwall during its annual Regatta Week in the third week of August and through Perranporth by local school children until as recently as the early 1990’s.

== See also ==
- Outline of Cornwall
