= 'Obby 'Oss festival =

May Day celebration in Cornwall, England

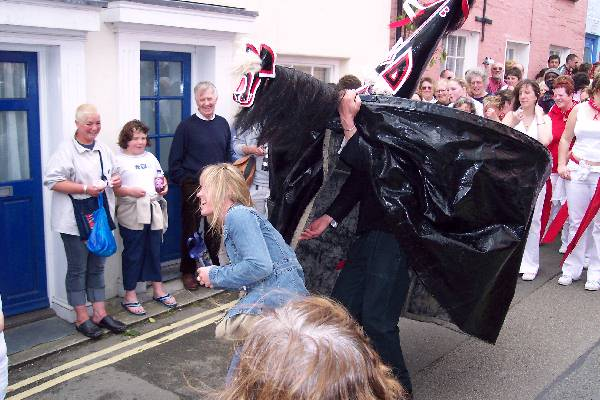
The Old 'Oss capturing a young woman during the May Day festival

The 'Obby 'Oss festival (/ˈɒbi ˈɒs/) is a folk custom that takes place each 1st of May in Padstow, a coastal town in North Cornwall. It involves two separate processions making their way around the town, each containing an eponymous hobby horse known as the 'Obby 'Oss.

The festival starts at midnight on the 30th of April when townspeople gather outside the Golden Lion Inn to sing the "Night Song". By morning, the town has been dressed with greenery and flowers placed around the maypole. The excitement begins with the appearance of one of the 'Obby 'Osses. Male dancers cavort through the town dressed as one of two 'Obby 'Osses, the "Old" and the "Blue Ribbon" or "Methodist" 'Obby 'Osses; as the name suggests, they are stylised depictions of horses. Prodded on by assistants known as "Teasers", each wears a mask and black frame-hung cape under which they try to catch young maidens as they pass through the town. Throughout the day, the two parades, led by the "MC" (Master of Ceremonies) in his top hat and decorated stick, followed by a band of accordions and drums, then the 'Oss and the Teaser, with a host of people, the "Mayers" – all singing the "Morning Song" – pass along the streets of the town. Finally, late in the evening, the two 'osses meet, at the maypole, before returning to their respective stables where the crowd sings of the 'Obby 'Oss death, until its resurrection the following May Eve.

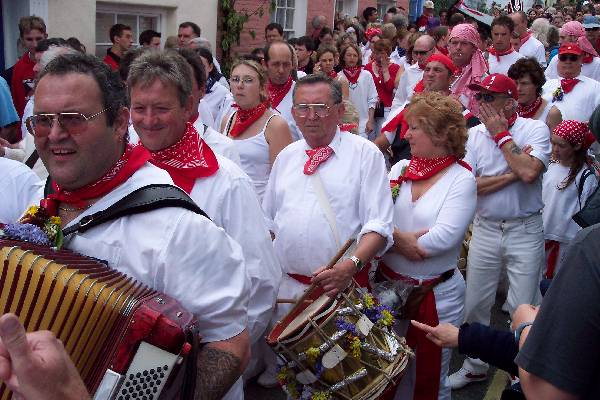
The Old 'Oss party attending the 'Obby 'Oss with dozens of accordions, melodeons and drums

During the twentieth century the existence of the festival was described by a number of folklorists who brought greater attention to it. This helped to make the event a popular tourist attraction and establish it as one of the most famous folk customs in Britain.

== Description ==
The festival takes place on May Day every year. It entails two separate processions that make their way around Padstow on circuits that take twelve hours to traverse. Each procession represents a different half of the town's community. Only those whose families have lived in Padstow for at least two generations are permitted to take part in the processions. Each procession includes an 'Obby 'Oss, a hobby horse consisting of an oval frame covered in black oilskin, which has a small horse's head in the front with a snapping jaw. This is led by an individual known as the Teaser, who is dressed in white and carries a painted club. The procession also contains a retinue of white-clad individuals, some playing accordions, melodeons and drums.

This retinue sings a local version of a Mayers' song. At times this tune becomes a dirge, at which the 'Obby 'Oss sinks to the ground and lies flat. When the chorus becomes triumphant again the 'Oss rises and continues along the procession.

== History ==
=== Origins ===
The origins of the celebrations in Padstow are unknown. There is extensive documentary evidence of British community May Day celebrations in the 16th century and earlier, although the earliest mention of the 'Obby 'Oss at Padstow dates from 1803. An earlier hobby horse is mentioned in the Cornish language drama Beunans Meriasek, a life of the Camborne saint, where it is associated with a troupe, or "companions." There is no evidence to suggest that the 'Obby 'Oss festival is older than the eighteenth century.

It has been speculated that such festivals have pre-Christian origins, such as in the Celtic festival of Beltane in the Celtic nations, and the Germanic celebrations during the Þrimilci-mōnaþ (literally Three-Milking Month or Month of Three Milkings) in England.

The custom attracted little attention outside of the town until 1907, when the folklorist Francis Etherington drew attention to it. In 1913 the folklorist Thurstan Peter wrote about it; influenced by the ideas of the anthropologist James Frazer, Peter argued that the 'Obby 'Oss custom might have once been a pre-Christian religious ritual designed to secure fertility. The idea that the custom had pre-Christian roots helped to convert it into a tourist attraction. This idea of the custom as a pre-Christian one percolated into the Padstow community, for when the historian Ronald Hutton visited the town in 1985 he found locals describing it to him as an ancient pagan fertility rite. In the 1950s Alan Lomax, then in London and working for the BBC, and his collaborator Peter Kennedy of the English Folk Dance and Song Society, decided to document the unique May Eve and May Day Festivals at Padstow, they selected George Pickow to be their cameraman. The result was the 16-minute colour film Oss Oss Wee Oss (1953).

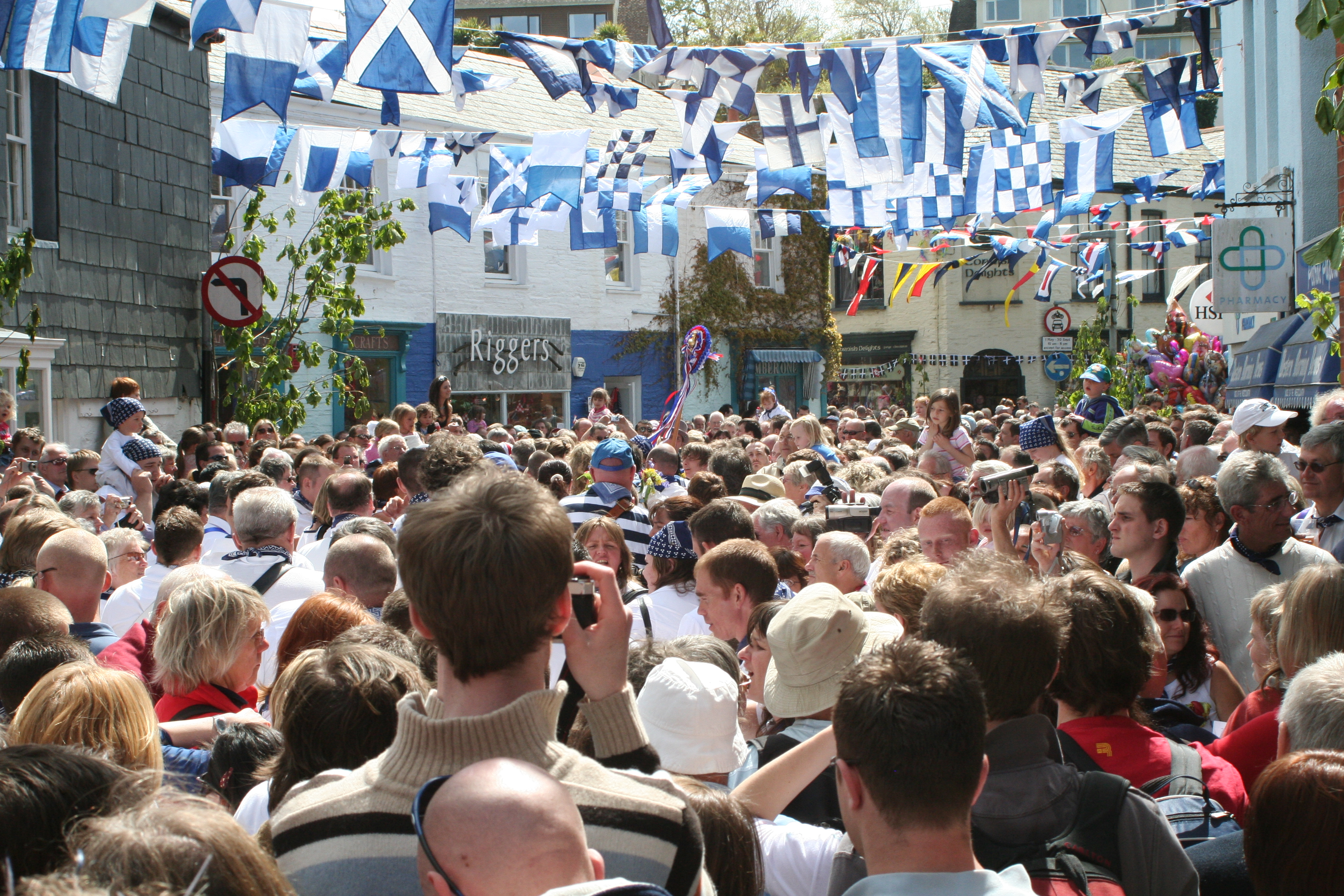
Crowds of tourists observing the Padstow 'Obby 'Oss custom in 2006

=== Modern developments ===
By the 1990s, the 'Obby 'Oss festival was a major attraction that drew large numbers of visitors to Lowennac/Padstow. By that point, Hutton referred to it as "one of the most famous and most dramatic folk customs of modern Britain", adding that it constituted "a tremendous reaffirmation of communal pride and solidarity in this small and normally quiet settlement". The folklorist Doc Rowe, who has attended and documented the custom every year since 1963, goes further – describing 'Obby 'Oss Day as "a united proclamation – almost a 'clenched fist' in the face of time and outside influences... [it] can be seen as a communal pace-maker and, on Mayday, it recharges the community and the good fellowship of the people of Padstow."

The festival was not held in 2020 due to the COVID-19 pandemic.

In 2022, a coroner's inquiry in Truro considered the death of Laura Smallwood at the 2019 event, when she was struck by a wooden 'Oss and fell unconscious. The coroner concluded that "I find as fact that the 'Oss struck Laura and it is far more likely than not that this caused the injuries identified at post-mortem that led directly to her death." He added that it was "frankly surprising" that the event had "no single event organiser" dealing with safety issues, and said that he would send a report to the government expressing concerns about such events needing to have a named organiser, as well as the need for more police powers to control them.

== Celebration practice ==
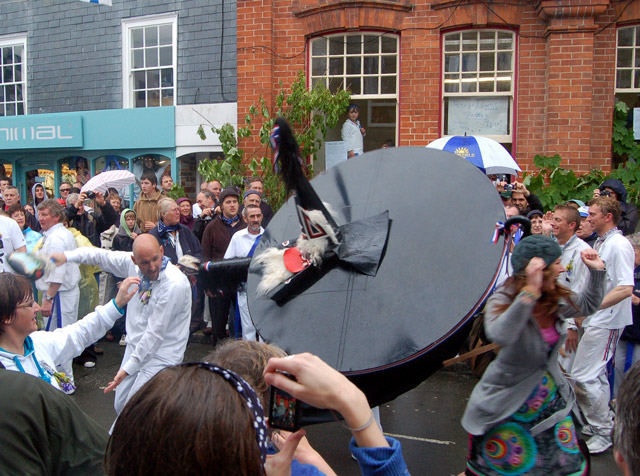
The blue ribbon 'Oss in 2009

The celebration itself starts at midnight on 30 April with unaccompanied singing around the town starting at the Golden Lion Inn. By the morning of 1 May, the town is dressed with greenery, flowers and flags, with the focus being the maypole. The climax arrives when two groups of dancers progress through the town, one of each team wearing a stylised recreation of a 'horse.' The two 'osses are known as the "Old" and the "Blue Ribbon" 'osses. During the day a number of "Junior" or "colt" 'osses appear, operated by children. Accompanied by drums and accordions and led by acolytes known as "Teasers", each 'oss is adorned by a gruesome mask and black, oilskin cape on a circular frame under which they try to catch young maidens as they pass through the town. The Blue ribbon 'oss is apparently of more recent origin. In the late 19th century, Blue 'Oss was supported by members of the Temperance movement who were trying to discourage the consumption of alcohol associated with the "old" 'oss followers. After the first world war the imperative of temperance was lost, and the 'oss became known as the Peace 'Oss. Each 'oss has a "stable" (in the case of the Old 'Oss, the Golden Lion Inn and the Blue Ribbon 'Oss, the Institute, from which they emerge at the start of the day's proceedings and retire at the end. Sometimes in the late afternoon, the 'osses may meet at the maypole and dance together.

=== Night Song ===
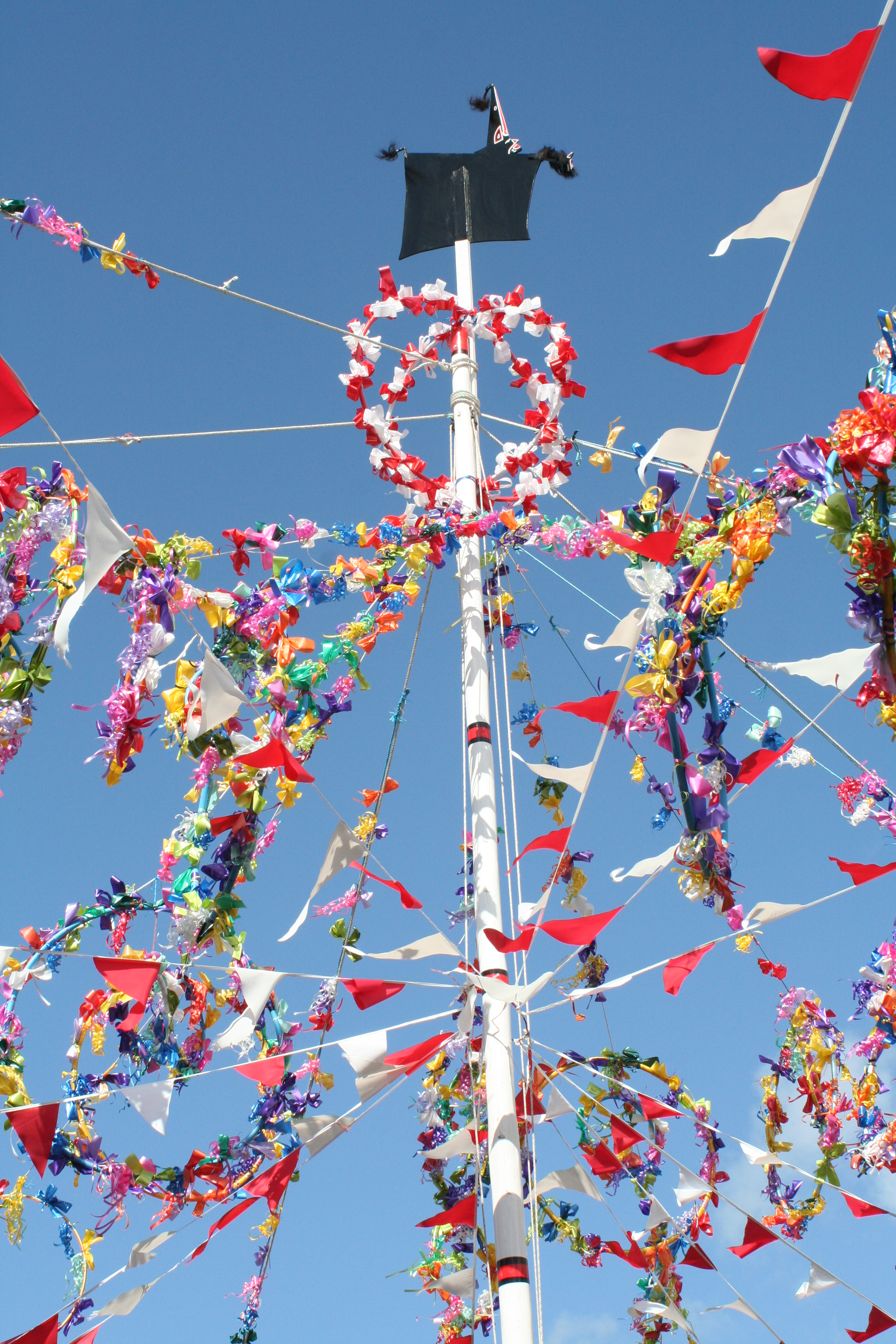
May Pole in Padstow, 2006

Unite and unite and let us all unite,
For summer is acome unto day,
And whither we are going we will all unite,
In the merry morning of May.

I warn you young men everyone,
For summer is acome unto day,
To go to the green-wood and fetch your May home,
In the merry morning of May.

Arise up Mr. ..... and joy you betide,
For summer is acome unto day,
And bright is your bride that lies by your side,
In the merry morning of May.

Arise up Mrs. ..... and gold be your ring,
For summer is acome unto day,
And give to us a cup of ale the merrier we shall sing,
In the merry morning of May.

Arise up Miss ..... all in your gown of green,
For summer is acome unto day,
You are as fine a lady as wait upon the Queen,
In the merry morning of May.

Now fare you well, and we bid you all good cheer,
For summer is acome unto day,
We call once more unto your house before another year,
In the merry morning of May.

These words are a well established tradition but it is speculated that 'summer is acome unto day' was originally 'sumer is icumen today' the 1st May traditionally being the herald of summer.

=== Day Song ===
Unite and unite and let us all unite,
For summer is acome unto day,
And whither we are going we will all unite,
In the merry morning of May.

Arise up Mr. ..... I know you well afine,
For summer is acome unto day,
You have a shilling in your purse and I wish it were in mine,
In the merry morning of May.

All out of your beds,
For summer is acome unto day,
Your chamber shall be strewed with the white rose and the red
In the merry morning of May.

Where are the young men that here now should dance,
For summer is acome unto day,
Some they are in England some they are in France,
In the merry morning of May.

Where are the maidens that here now should sing,
For summer is acome unto day,
They are in the meadows the flowers gathering,
In the merry morning of May.

Arise up Mr. ..... with your sword by your side,
For summer is acome unto day,
Your steed is in the stable awaiting for to ride,
In the merry morning of May.

Arise up Miss ..... and strew all your flowers,
For summer is acome unto day,
It is but a while ago since we have strewn ours,
In the merry morning of May.

O! where is St. George,
O!, where is he O,
He is out in his long boat on the salt sea O.
Up flies the kite and down tails the lark O.
Aunt Ursula Birdhood she had an old ewe
And she died in her own Park O.

With the merry ring, adieu the merry spring,
For summer is acome unto day,
How happy is the little bird that merrily doth sing,
In the merry morning of May.

The young men of Padstow they might if they would,
For summer is acome unto day,
They might have built a ship and gilded her with gold,
In the merry morning of May.

The young women of Padstow might if they would,
For summer is acome unto day,
They might have made a garland with the white rose and the red,
In the merry morning of May.

Arise up Mr. ..... and reach me your hand,
For summer is acome unto day,
And you shall have a lively lass with a thousand pounds in hand.
In the merry morning of May.

Arise up Miss ..... all in your cloak of silk,
For summer is acome unto day,
And all your body under as white as any milk,
In the merry morning of May.

O! where is St. George,
O!, where is he O,
He is out in his long boat on the salt sea O.
Up flies the kite and down tails the lark O.
Aunt Ursula Birdhood she had an old ewe
And she died in her own Park O.

Now fare you well and bid you all good cheer,
For summer is acome unto day,
We call no more unto your house before another year,
In the merry morning of May.

== Similar hobby horses elsewhere ==
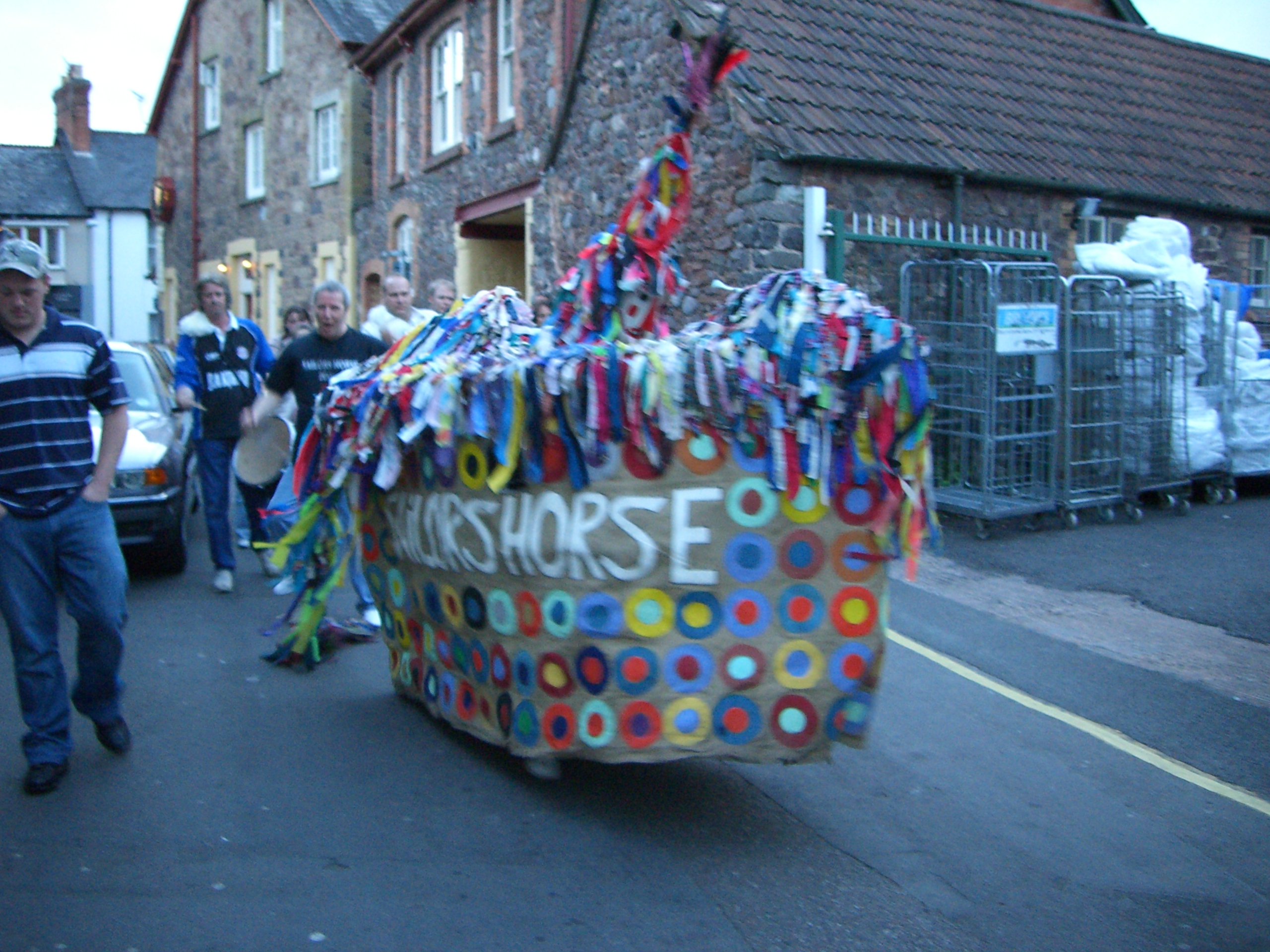
The Minehead Hobby Horse in 2008

'Obby 'Oss traditions also exist in nearby Barnstaple and Combe Martin.

Minehead in Somerset also has two large hobby horses, the Sailors' Horse and the Town Horse. Although more pointed or boat-shaped than the Padstow 'Osses, they are similar in that the dancer within the costume wears a tall, conical hat with a grotesque mask over their face; the horse framework is suspended from the dancer's shoulders and a long skirt hangs down to partly hide their body; the animal's heads are small and wooden with snapping jaws. They also capture bystanders.

There is documentary evidence of an 'Oss at Penzance in the late 19th century, made with a caped stick and skull, which has formed the basis of the Penglaz 'Obby 'Oss that appears during the Golowan festival and the Montol Festival, both modern revivals; the skull 'oss is strikingly similar to the Mari Lwyd in Wales associated with the pre-Christian deity Rhiannon, known as Epona the horse goddess in continental Celtic cultures, passing into festive folklore as 'the Old Grey Mare' in neighbouring parts of Britain e.g. Dartmoor (Widecombe Fair), Dorset (The Grey Mare and her Colts), as well as the Soultide mummers' horses of Cheshire.

Similar Corpus Christi (May–June) folk tradition exists in Galicia in Spain and Portugal where St George fights a dragon in the manner of the Cornish Mummers Plays. Tinsel-cloaked street entertainers dress similarly to the Welsh Mari Llywd but the snapping animal skull might be a goat or fox rather than horse and depicts the Coco or the Peluda.

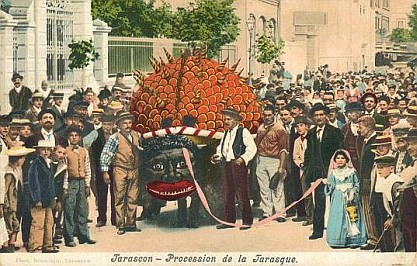
The Tarasque from Southern France

The Tarasque procession from southern France has direct pre-Roman Celtic antecedents and a terrifying ancient Celtic sculpture at the Musée lapidaire d'Avignon depicts the monster hoarding severed human heads.

There are some similarities between this festival and the Lajkonik hobby-horse festival in Kraków, Poland. In particular the idea that young women may be captured or struck with a stick to bring them "luck" or fertility suggests a pagan, or at least medieval origin. Lajkonik is 700 years old.

Rather more recent is the Banbury Hobby-Horse festival, which started in 2000, and features ritual animals from all parts of the British Isles, some old, some more modern.
