= Robert Morton Nance =

British writer and nautical archaeologist

Robert Morton Nance (1873–1959) was a British writer and leading authority on the Cornish language, a nautical archaeologist, and joint founder of the Old Cornwall Society.

Nance wrote many books and pamphlets on the Cornish language, including a Cornish dictionary, which is a standard work, and edited magazines and pamphlets about Cornwall, including Old Cornwall, the journal of the Federation of Old Cornwall Societies. Nance was also a nautical archaeologist of distinction and was an originator of the Society for Nautical Research. His insight and learning were displayed in his book Sailing-ship Models which appeared in 1924. He studied art in Britain and France and was both a painter and a skilled craftsman.

== Work with the Cornish language ==
My own interest in Cornish came, I expect, from my father's comparison of Cornish names with Welsh, of which he knew a little, having had at least enough interest in it to get a dictionary and grammar.

In 1898, Robert Morton Nance wrote The Merry Ballad of the Cornish Pasty.

Nance began studying the Cornish language in 1904 from Henry Jenner's A Handbook of the Cornish language, although he would later steer the language revival towards mediaeval Cornish.

...even the Handbook did not get me to the stage of attempting to write or speak the language, as the projected book of exercises might have done had it been printed. If I could puzzle out such things in Cornish as were printed in a Penzance newspaper that seemed enough.

He began to write and illustrate poetry for Arthur Quiller-Couch's Cornish Magazine.

In 1909, Nance and Jenner met in Falmouth while the former was researching for the book A Glossary of Cornish Sea Words (published only after his death as a memorial volume in 1959). They became friends and spent the next decade researching Cornish and collecting tidbits of traditional Cornish. These were published in a series of papers which were read both to the Royal Institution of Cornwall and the Royal Cornwall Polytechnic Society.

Jenner and Nance formed the first Old Cornwall Society in St Ives in 1920. Its motto was "Cuntelleugh an Brewyon us Gesys na vo Kellys Travyth". By 1924, there were sufficient Old Cornwall Societies for a Federation, with Jenner as its president and Nance as its recorder. The Federation established the periodical Old Cornwall in 1925.

The 1920s to circa 1940 saw Nance and A. S. D. Smith using the works of Edward Lhuyd and Whitley Stokes, as well as Breton grammar, to resolve the issue of syntax and grammar in Cornish.

On 21 September 1928, Nance, Jenner and others held the first Gorsedh Kernow at Boscawen-Un. Twelve bards were made, including Nance who took the bardic name Mordon ('Sea Wave'). In 1929, he published Cornish for All, a work which detailed a version of Cornish based on the Ordinalia and other mediaeval texts, creating the Unified Cornish spelling system and defining the next phase of the Revival.

An Balores, the first play written in Unified Cornish, was written by Nance in 1932 and performed that year at the Celtic Congress meeting in Truro. That year, on 31 December, the Western Morning News published a speech by Henry Jenner on the subject of Cornish patriotism in which he wrote "Bedheugh Byntha Kernewek" (Be Forever Cornish). A group of young Cornish folk who were politically active united to form Cornwall's first national political movement, Tyr ha Tavas (Land and Language), taking Jenner's phrase as their motto to lobby parliament. Nance commented at the time:

The young people of this group are among those who 'see visions' and from the response to their clarion call, there is ground for hoping that they represent a new and growing force which will help to revive in Cornish people a consciousness of their race and destiny, and to create a bond of affinity and unity between the remnants of the Cornish Nation throughout the world.

In 1934, with the death of Henry Jenner, Nance became Bardh Meur or Grand Bard of the Cornish Gorsedh. That same year, Nance and Smith published a small English-Cornish Dictionary together. His life's work, a full Cornish-English dictionary, was completed by Nance in 1938. £2000 of the day's money was raised by volunteer donations to pay for the work's publication. It was revised and extended to include an English-Cornish section in 1952.

Lyver an Pymp Marthus Selevan, a collection of folk tales from the St. Levan parish written to imitate the style of Cornwall's miracle-plays, was published by Nance in 1939. 1949 saw the chance discovery in the British Museum of the Tregear Homilies. John Mackechnie, the Celtic scholar who discovered them, passed news of the discovery on to Nance.

The Old Cornwall Societies began in 1951 to publish a series of small booklets with extracts from Middle Cornish edited in Unified Cornish by Nance and A. S. D. Smith. Including among these texts were Bewnans Meryasek, An Tyr Marya, Sylvester ha'n Dhragon, Abram hag Ysak, Adam ha Seth, Davydd hag Urry and An Venen ha'y Map.

Nance served as President of the Royal Institution of Cornwall from 1951 to 1955. During this time, he worked to improve modern Cornish and publish new editions in 1952 and 1955 of his two dictionaries. In 1954, records were produced of Nance reading the story Jowan Chy an Hor, as well as Boorde's Colloquies and the Lord's Prayer. Before his death in 1959, he remarked: "One generation has set Cornish on its feet. It is now for another to make it walk."

== Personal life ==
Nance was born in Cardiff to Cornish parents. His father was from Padstow. Nance spent most of his youth living in Penarth and studied art in Cardiff and Hertfordshire. In 1906, Nance moved from Wales and settled at Nancledra near St Ives, Cornwall from where he jointly founded the Society for Nautical Research in 1911. In 1959, he died and was buried at St Senara's Church, Zennor after taking ill in the autumn of 1957.

== Selected list of works ==
- 1912: Speight, E E; Nance, R Morton (1 January 1912). Britain's Sea Story. Henry Frowde. ASIN B000LQ60UM
- 1923: A Glossary of Celtic Words in Cornish Dialect. Falmouth: Royal Cornwall Polytechnic Society
- 1924: Sailing-ship Models: a selection from European and American collections with introductory text. London: Halton and Truscott Smith (photographs)
  - ---do.---2nd rev. ed. London; New York: Halton, 1949
  - Classic Sailing-ship Models in Photographs. Reprinted Dover Publications, Mineola, NY, 2000 ISBN 0-486-41249-0
- 1925- : Old Cornwall, as editor and contributor.
  - Articles in Old Cornwall, including "The Cornish Language in the Seventeenth Century", in: Old Cornwall; vol. VI, no. 1.
- 1932: An Balores, a play in Unified Cornish
- 1934: English-Cornish Dictionary, with A. S. D. Smith
- 1938: Cornish-English Dictionary. Federation of Old Cornwall Societies ISBN 0-902660-05-5
- 1956: The Cledry Plays: drolls of Old Cornwall for village acting and home reading. Federation of Old Cornwall Societies B0000CJH1W
- 1961: Cornish for All: a guide to Unified Cornish. Federation of Old Cornwall Societies. B0000CKWG1
- [n.d.]: A Guide to Cornish Place-names; with a list of the words contained in them. Federation of Old Cornwall Societies. (Three editions, before 1971.)

== See also ==
- Richard Gendall
- Ken George
- Henry Jenner
- Dolly Pentreath
- Nicholas Williams

== Sources ==
- Obituary in The Times, 28 May 1959.
