= Federation of Old Cornwall Societies =

The Federation of Old Cornwall Societies
- Old Cornwall Society emblem, featuring the Cornish chough and "King Arthur is not Dead" in Cornish
- Abbreviation: FOCS
- Formation: 1924
- Founder: Robert Morton Nance
- President: Nev Meek
- Website: kernowgoth.org

The Federation of Old Cornwall Societies (FOCS) was formed in 1924, on the initiative of Robert Morton Nance, with the objective of collecting and maintaining "all those ancient things that make the spirit of Cornwall — its traditions, its old words and ways, and what remains to it of its Celtic language and nationality".

== Motto ==
The motto of the federation—as written on their web site—is "Cuntelleugh an brewyon ues gesys na vo kellys travyth", which translated into English is "Gather ye the fragments that are left, that nothing be lost". The motto in the OCS logo is the Cornish phrase King Arthur is not dead. The first Old Cornwall Society was established by Robert Morton Nance in St Ives in 1920.

Today, The Federation of Old Cornwall Societies consists of over 40 individual societies throughout Cornwall. There are also other affiliated groups within Cornwall as well as those Associated societies and groups in England and overseas.

== Events ==
The OCS celebrate the old Cornish tradition of midsummer bonfires, normally held on 23 June each year. The hilltop bonfires that form a chain are currently held at Carn Brea near St Just, Kit Hill, St Breock Beacon, Castle An Dinas, and Redruth.

In the autumn the harvest festival known as Crying The Neck is also celebrated by the OCS.

== Periodical ==
Old Cornwall, the journal of the Federation, began publication in 1925 and is published twice yearly. The first editor was Robert Morton Nance.

== See also ==
- Gorseth Kernow
- List of topics related to Cornwall
