= Allantide =

Cornish festival

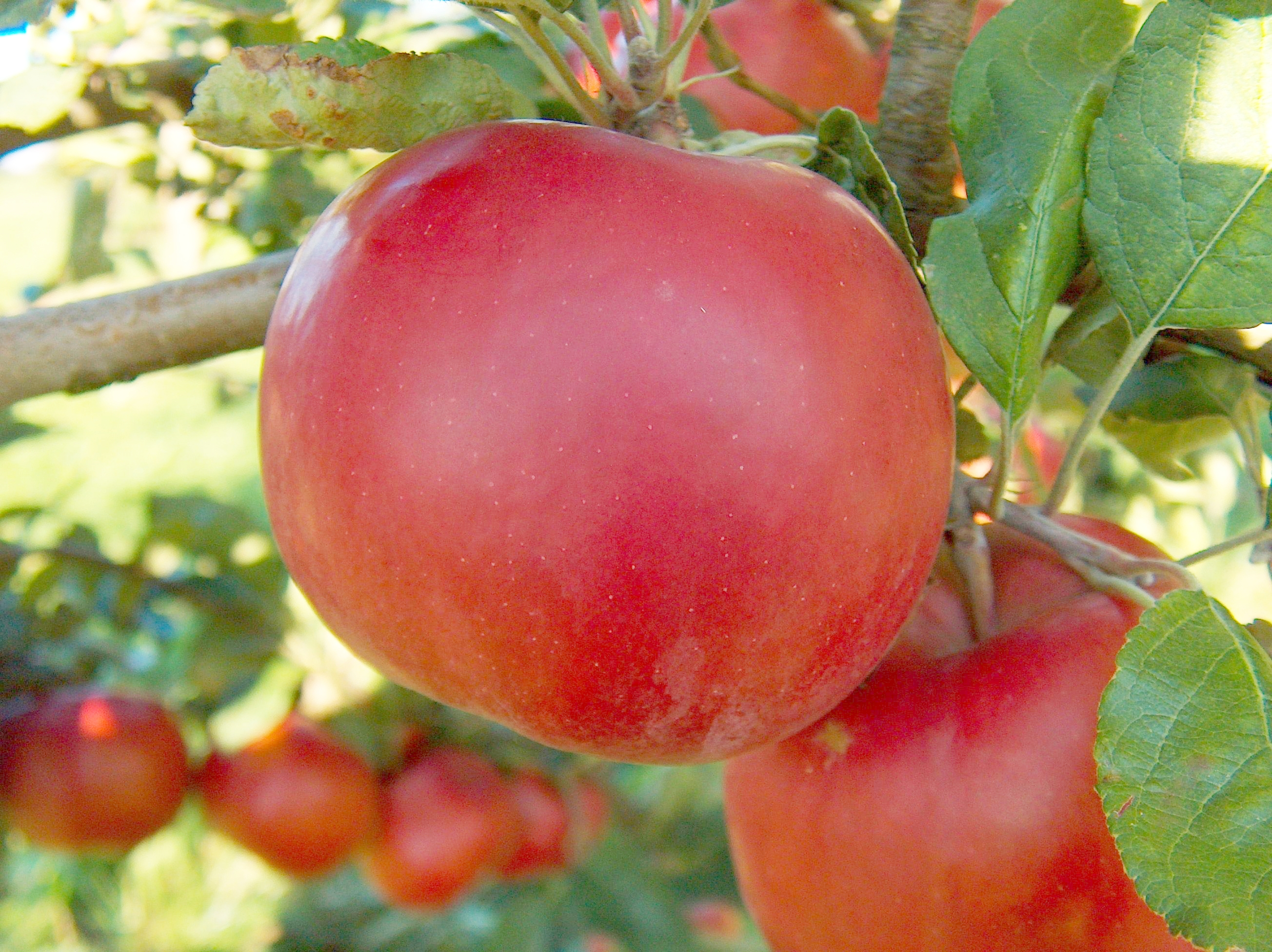
Large red apples similar to the "Allan" apples popular in West Cornwall during Allantide

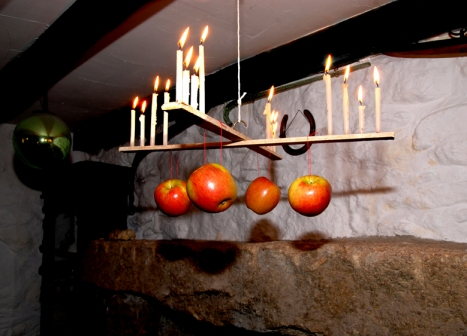
An Allantide game made in 2009

Allantide (Cornish: Kalan Gwav, meaning first day of winter, or Nos Kalan Gwav, meaning eve of the first day of winter and Dy' Halan Gwav, meaning day of the first day of winter), also known as Saint Allan's Day or the Feast of Saint Allan, is a Cornish festival that was traditionally celebrated on the night of 31 October, as well as the following day time, and known elsewhere as Allhallowtide. The festival in Cornwall is the liturgical feast day of St Allan (also spelled St Allen or St Arlan), who was the bishop of Quimper in the sixth century. As such, Allantide is also known as Allan Night and Allan Day. The origins of the name Allantide also probably stem from the same sources as Hollantide (Wales and the Isle of Man) and Hallowe'en itself.

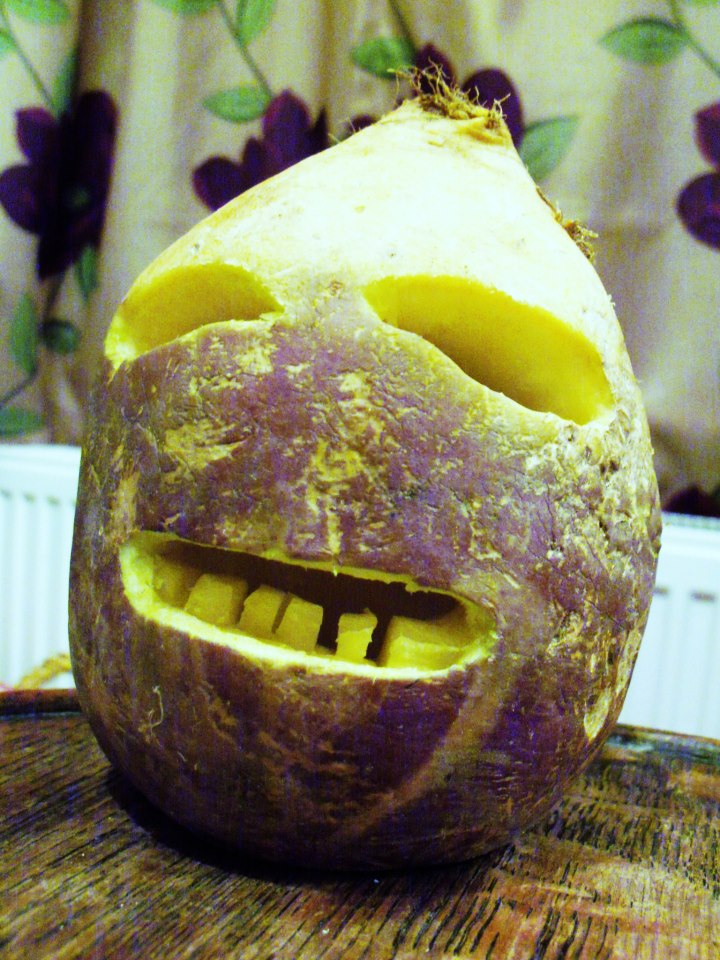
Traditional Cornish jack-o'-lantern made from a turnip

The Cornish language name for the festival is found in the Exeter Consistory Court depositions for the year 1572. It was reported in the court case that an altercation occurred upon Dew Whallan Gwa Metten in Eglos De Lalant, viz. upon all hallow day ... in the parish church of Lalant. This being Dy'Halan Gwav, from Kalan Gwav, with dy (day) causing an aspirate mutation to kalan. Kalan Gwav, like the Welsh Calan Gaeaf, meaning the first day of winter.

As with the start of the celebration of Allhallowtide in the rest of Christendom, church bells were rung in order to comfort Christian souls in the intermediate state. Another important part of this festival was the giving of Allan apples, large glossy red apples that were highly polished, to family and friends as tokens of good luck. Allan apple markets used to be held throughout West Cornwall in the run up to the feast.

The following is a description of the festival as it was celebrated in Penzance at the turn of the 19th century:

The shops in Penzance would display Allan apples, which were highly polished large apples. On the day itself, these apples were given as gifts to each member of the family as a token of good luck. Older girls would place these apples under their pillows and hope to dream of the person whom they would one day marry. A local game is also recorded where two pieces of wood were nailed together in the shape of a cross. It was then suspended with 4 candles on each outcrop of the cross shape. Allan apples would then be suspended under the cross. The goal of the game was to catch the apples in your mouth, with hot wax being the penalty for slowness or inaccuracy.

In his book Popular Romances of the West of England, Robert Hunt describes Allantide in St Ives:

The ancient custom of providing children with a large apple on Allhallows-eve is still observed, to a great extent, at St Ives. "Allan-day," as it is called, is the day of days to hundreds of children, who would deem it a great misfortune were they to go to bed on "Allan-night" without the time-honoured Allan apple to hide beneath their pillows. A quantity of large apples are thus disposed of the sale of which is dignified by the term Allan Market.

There are a number of divination games recorded including the throwing of walnuts in fires to predict the fidelity of partners, and the pouring of molten lead into cold water as a way of predicting the occupation of future husbands, the shape of the solidified lead somehow indicating this.

In some parts of Cornwall "Tindle" fires were lit similar in nature to the Coel Coth (Coel Certh) of Wales.

Before the 20th century the parish feast of St Just in Penwith was known as Allantide.

== See also ==
- Calan Gaeaf - Wales
- Dziady
- Hop-tu-Naa - Isle of Man
- Nickanan Night
- St Allen
- Winter Nights
