= List of Cornish musicians =

This is a list of Cornish musicians or other musicians resident in Cornwall, England, United Kingdom.

== Composers and classical musicians ==
- Kevin Ackford, Brass Band composer and arranger, conductor and Tutor
- Malcolm Arnold, composer
- William Beale, composer and singer
- Kerensa Briggs, composer, primarily of choral and organ music
- Dame Alida Brittain, harpist
- Philip Cannon, composer
- Cornelius Cardew, composer
- Ralph Dunstan, composer and musicologist
- Alfred John Ellory, leading British flautist who played on the Beatles song "The Fool on the Hill"
- Janet Elston
- Joseph Antonio Emidy, violinist and composer
- Giles Farnaby, composer (alleged)
- Graham Fitkin, composer
- Esme Francis, songwriter and harpist
- Derek Holman, composer, conductor and choirmaster
- Charles Benjamin Incledon, singer
- Richard Jose, singer
- Gerald Hocken Knight, cathedral organist
- George Lloyd, composer
- Benjamin Luxon, singer
- Moura Lympany, pianist
- Richard John Maddern-Williams, composer and organist
- Thomas Merritt, composer
- Alan Opie, singer
- William Paull, baritone singer
- Kenneth Pelmear, composer of "Hail to the Homeland"
- Elizabeth Philp, singer, music educator and composer
- Goff Richards, brass band arranger and composer
- Ben Salfield, lutenist, composer and editor
- Dudley Savage, organist
- Edmund Sedding, architect and musician; resident at Penzance
- George Thalben-Ball, organist
- Michael Tippett, composer
- Thomas Tomkins, composer
- Stephen Varcoe, singer
- David Willcocks, choral conductor, organist, and composer; born at Newquay

== Popular musicians ==
- Tori Amos, American singer-songwriter; has a home and studio near Bude
- Ani Glass (Anna Eiluned Saunders), Welsh-Cornish musician (sister of Gwenno)
- Hilary Coleman, of Dalla and Cumpas Ltd.
- Phyllis Doherty, folk singer, First World War commandant of Women's Volunteer Motor Corps
- Kevin Downing, drummer for 1990s indie band The Family Cat
- Louis Eliot, singer-songwriter
- Fisherman's Friends, a cappella group
- Mick Fleetwood, drummer in rock band Fleetwood Mac
- Bruce Foxton, bass player in punk rock band The Jam
- Jon Fugler, electronic musician
- Gwenno, Welsh-Cornish musician (sister of Ani Glass)
- Al Hodge (1951–2006), rock musician and songwriter
- Richard D. James (a.k.a. "Aphex Twin"), electronic music artist
- Andy Mackay, musician and founder member of art rock band Roxy Music
- Ralph McTell, singer-songwriter
- Tim McVay, guitarist in indie band The Family Cat
- Tom Middleton, electronic musician
- James Morrison, singer-songwriter
- Alex Parks, singer-songwriter
- Tim Rice, lyricist
- Goff Richards, brass band arranger and composer
- Roger Taylor, drummer in rock band Queen
- Sheila Tracy, trombone player and broadcaster
- Luke Vibert, electronic music artist
- Veryan Weston, jazz and rock pianist
- Keren Woodward, singer-songwriter and composer in female pop band Bananarama
- Brenda Wootton (1928–1994), Cornish bard and singer

== See also ==
- List of people from Cornwall
- Music of Cornwall
