= Dance (social event) =

Dance as a social event

As a social event, dance is an event whose primary goal and activity is dancing of all its participants.

Dance/dancing may be a sub-event of a broader event, such as wedding or bar mizvah.

== History ==
=== Prehistorical ===
In his book The Singing Neanderthals: The Origins of Music, Language, Mind, and Body, Steven J. Mithen writes: "In many societies today dancing is used as a form of display for attracting mate... Dancing is a means to show off one's physical fitness and co-ordination, qualities that would have been useful for survival in prehistoric hunter-gatherer societies." Mithen argues dance and music likely became an important tool of social interaction as soon as humans could walk and talk.

=== Modern times ===
==== European culture ====
Dances of the aristocracy was an important courtly pastime as attested since at least the 14th century. The earliest known dance instruction books are dated by the 15th century and they described the dances of the high society. However, the earliest records of the dancing of ordinary folk date by the end of the 16th century.

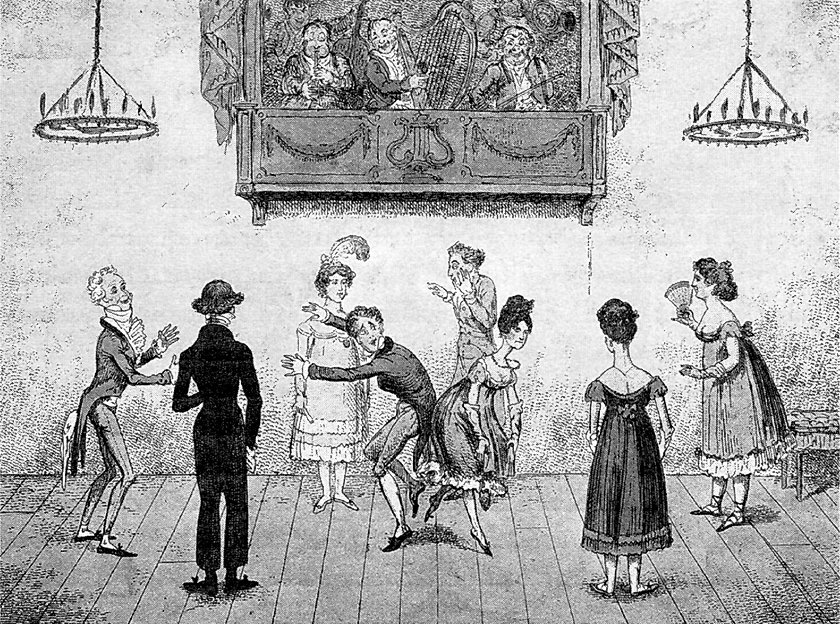
"Accidents in Quadrille Dancing", 1817 caricature

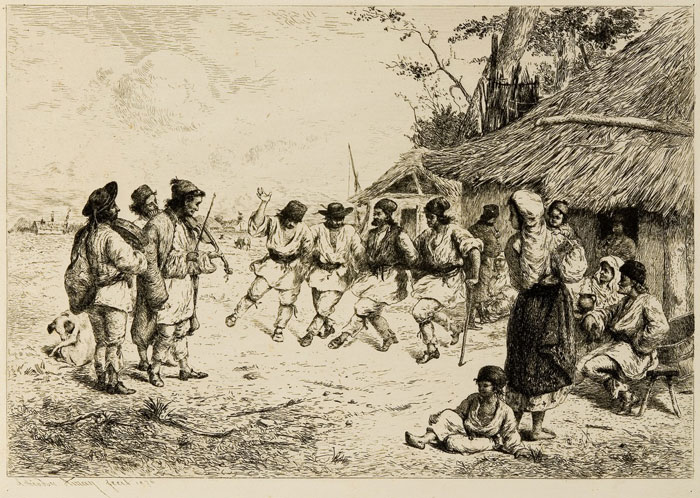
Brîuleţul, Romanian dance, 19th century

In 18th and 19th centuries group dances dominated ballrooms, especially the quadrille. In early 1900s dance and etiquette manuals paid attention to ceremonial details of the ballroom. Rules and rituals were established, including the correct ways of issuing party invitations and giving parties and balls, asking a partner to dance, appropriate conversation while dancing a quadrille, and wearing the latest ballroom fashions.

== Dance event types ==
East Coast Swing and the Lindy Hop social dance exchange event in Montreal in 2022

A number of types of social dance events can be distinguished.

- Ball
  - Debutante ball
- Dance party
  - Rave
- School dance
  - Sock hop
  - Prom
- Tea dance
- Traditional dance events
  - Balfolk
  - Barn dance
  - Cèilidh
  - Troyl
  - Twmpath

Classified by the type of dance involved:

- Circle dance, Contra dance, Line dance
- Milonga
