= Noson lawen =

Welsh tradition

Noson Lawen Noson Ddifyr
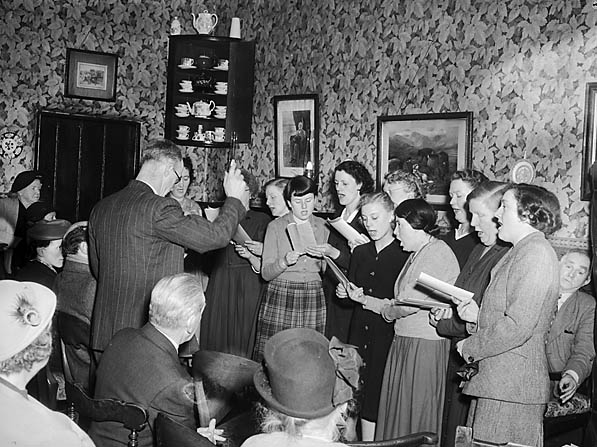
- a 'Noson Lawen' concert at Lleweni Uchaf, Bodfari, held before the last tenants left, showing Bodfari women's choir singing. (photographer: Geoff Charles)
- Medium: Dance
- Originating culture: Welsh

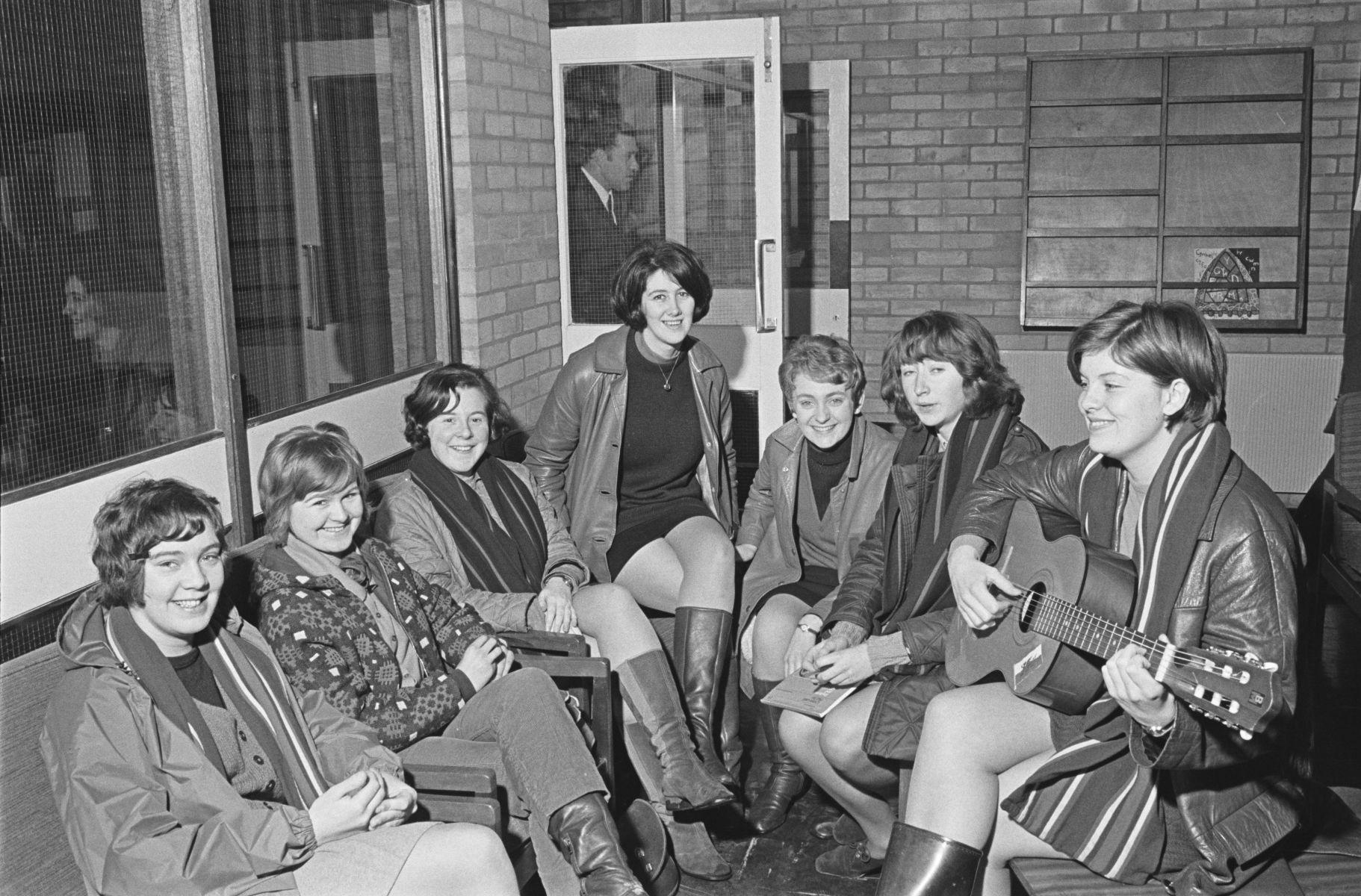
A Noson Lawen held at Bangor University in 1969

Noson lawen (Welsh pronunciation: [ˈnɔsɔn ˈlauɛn]; literally 'merry or joyful night') (also known as Noson Ddifyr in the Nantgarw dance tradition) is a Welsh term for a party with music, similar to a cèilidh.

== See also ==
- Cèilidh
- Feis
- Fest noz
- Nos lowen
- Troyl
- Twmpath
