= Barn dance =

Social event for traditional dancing

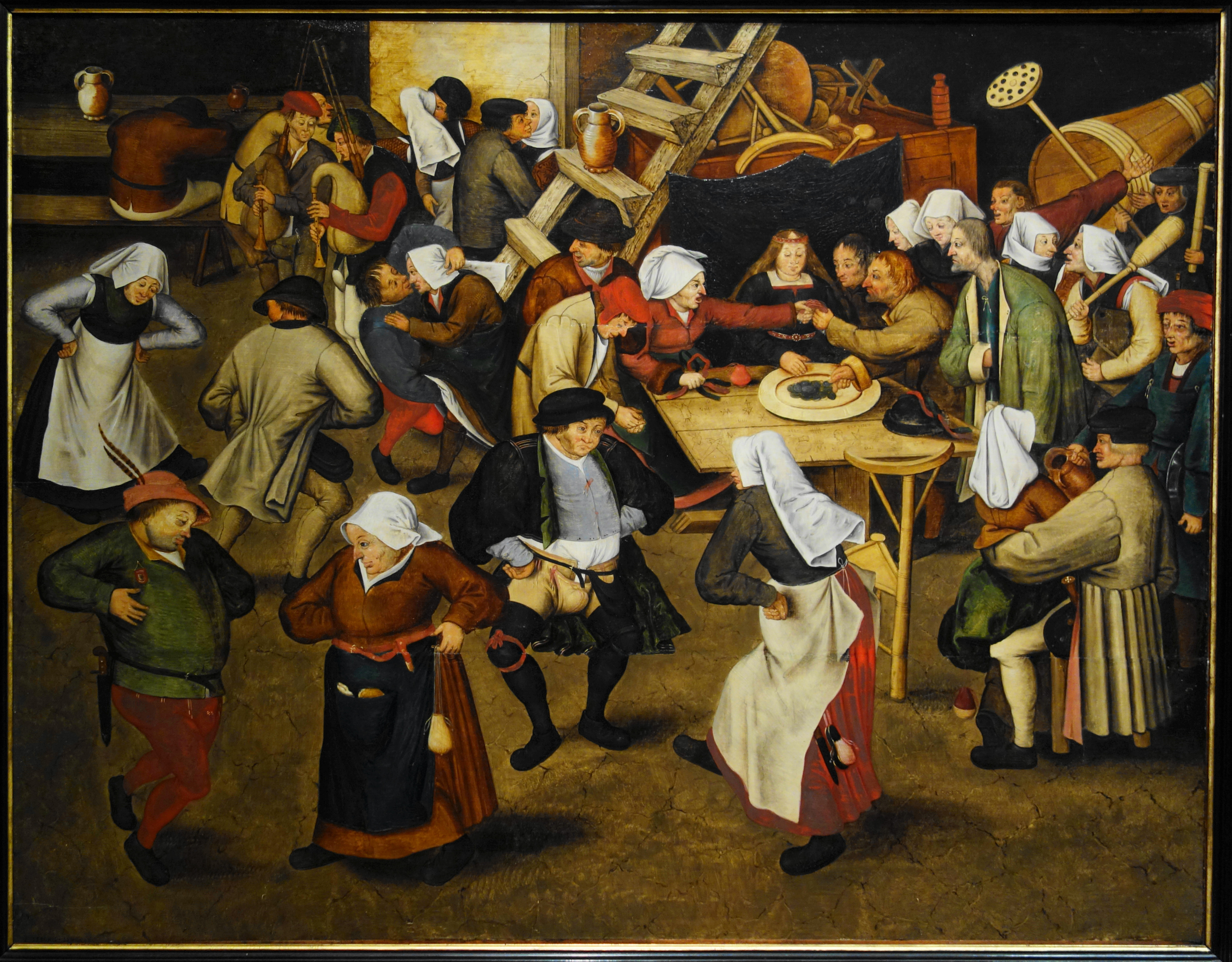
Pieter Brueghel the Younger, Wedding Dance in a Barn (c. 1616)

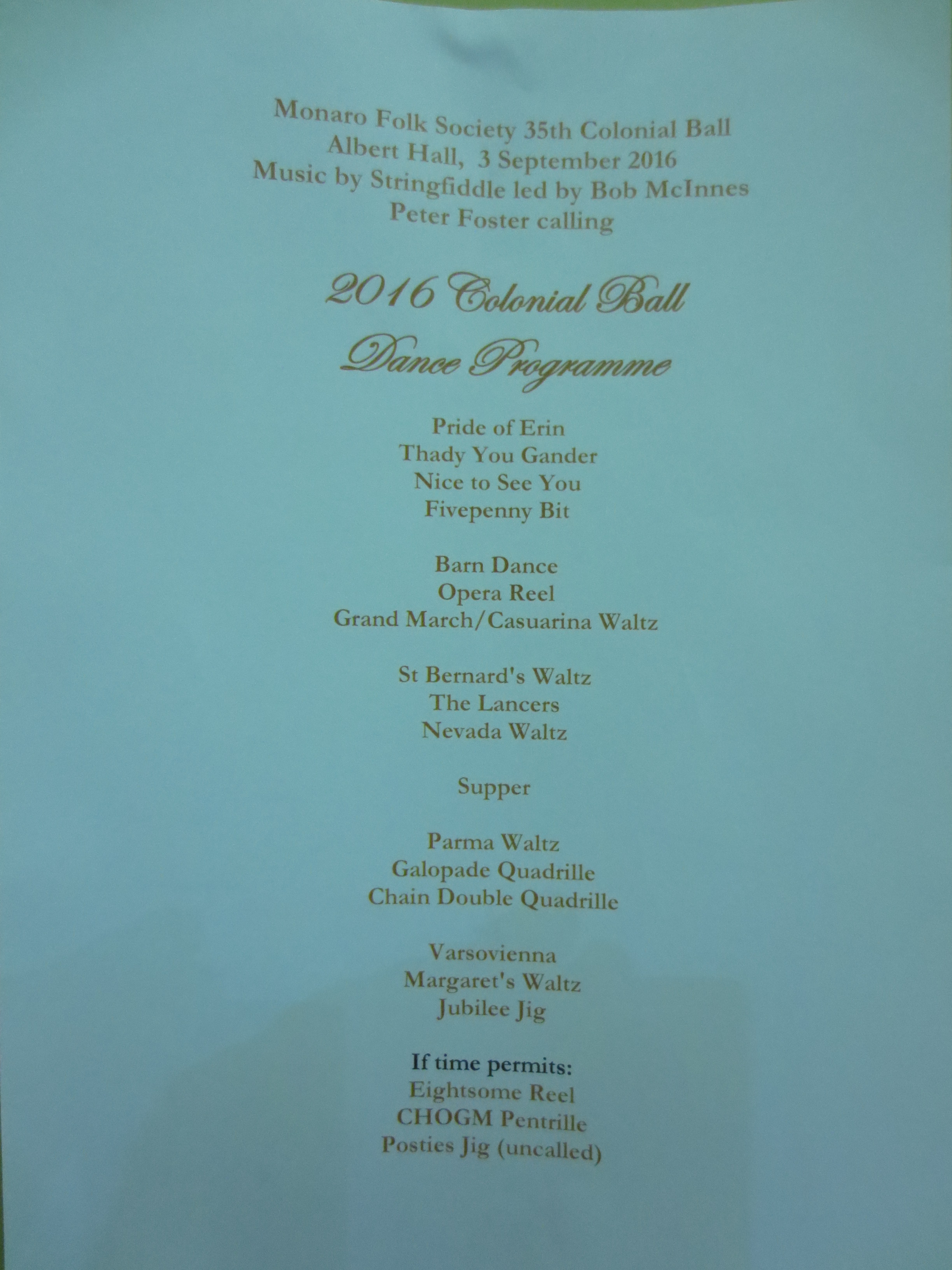
Dance program including the barn dance. Traditional dancing (2016)

A barn dance is any kind of dance involving traditional or folk music with traditional dancing, occasionally held in a barn, but, these days, much more likely to be in any suitable building.

The term "barn dance" is usually associated with family-oriented or community-oriented events, usually for people who do not normally dance. The caller will, therefore, generally use easy dances so that everyone can join in.

A barn dance can be a ceilidh, with traditional Irish or Scottish dancing, and people unfamiliar with either format often confuse the two terms. However, a barn dance can also feature square dancing, contra dancing, English country dance, dancing to country and western music, or any other kind of dancing, often with a live band and a caller. Modern western square dance is often confused with barn dancing in Britain.

Barn dances, as social dances, were popular in Ireland until the 1950s, and were typically danced to tunes with 4/4 rhythms.

== Radio adaptations ==
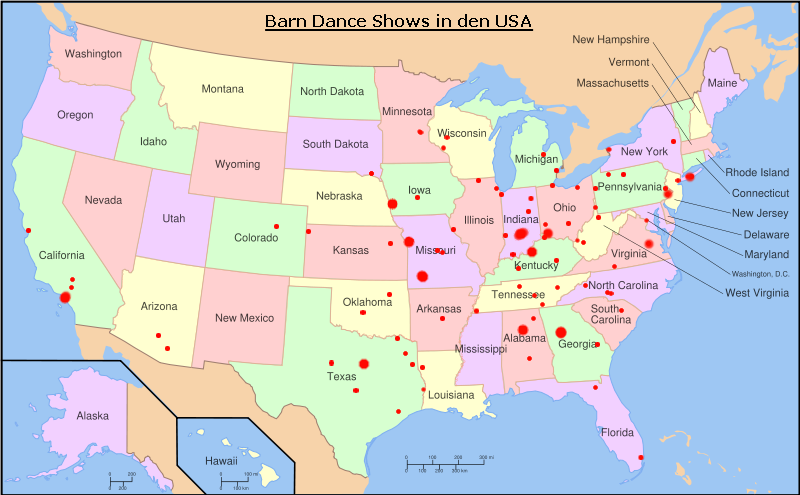
Barn dance shows in the United States

WLS in Chicago is credited with developing the "barn dance" radio format, which was in large part responsible for the advent of country music in the United States. The National Barn Dance began as a program of old-time fiddling on April 19, 1924, with George D. Hay as the show's host and announcer. A year-and-a-half later, Hay moved to Nashville, Tennessee and brought in an old-time fiddler to launch the WSM Barn Dance; this show is now known as the Grand Ole Opry and remains on the air to this day. Dozens of similar programs cropped up on AM radio stations all across the United States, from New England to Los Angeles, including the WWVA Jamboree in Wheeling, West Virginia (1933), the Renfro Valley Barn Dance in Kentucky (1939), the Louisiana Hayride (1948), the Tennessee Jamboree (1953) and Ozark Jubilee (1954). Television adaptations (often under the guise of early variety shows) were popular in the 1950s and early 1960s but eventually faded out of style.

== See also ==
- Barn theatre
- Fest Noz
- Noze looan
- Twmpath
