= Full Swing =

Full Swing or In Full Swing may refer to:

== Television and video ==
- Full Swing (game show), a short-lived 1996 British golfing game show with Jimmy Tarbuck
- Full Swing (2008 TV series), a 2008 Japanese television series
- Full Swing (2023 TV series), a 2023 television series released by Netflix
- "Full Swing", an episode of FLCL animated video series

== Music ==
- Full Swing (EP), by Crowns (2012)
- "Full Swing", a track on I Remember (AlunaGeorge album) (2016)
- "Full Swing", a track on News (album) by NEWS
- In Full Swing (Seth MacFarlane album) (2017)
- Hot Swing Trio: In Full Swing (2003)
