= Brenda Wootton =

Cornish folk singer and poet (1928–1994)

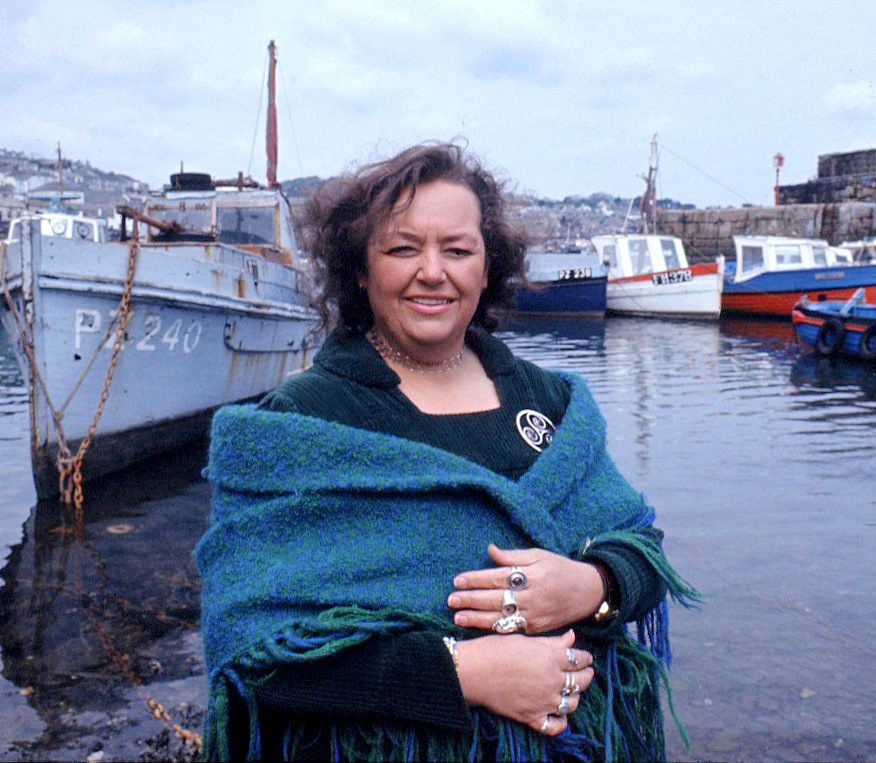
- Wootton at Newlyn Harbour

Background information
- Born: 10 February 1928; London, England
- Origin: Newlyn, Cornwall, England
- Died: 11 March 1994 (aged 66) Penzance, Cornwall, England
- Genre: Cornish folk
- Instrument: Vocals
- Years active: 1960s–1980s
- Labels: Sentinel Records, Transatlantic Records
- Website: Official website

Brenda Wootton (née Ellery; 10 February 1928 – 11 March 1994) was a Cornish folk singer and poet and was seen as an ambassador for Cornish tradition and culture in all the Celtic nations and as far as Australia and Canada.

== Early life ==
Brenda Ellery was born in London on 10 February 1928, during a brief few months when her Cornish-born parents were there looking for work, but was back home in Cornwall at 6 months old. She grew up in the fishing village of Newlyn. In 1948 she married John Wootton, a radio engineer from Wolverhampton, and their daughter Susan was born in 1949. They lived in Sennen, then Penzance, with Brenda running a bed and breakfast business and very involved in amateur dramatics. In 1964 she switched careers and helped her brother Peter Ellery set up his Tremaen pottery business – becoming a director and running the family shop, the Tremaen Craft Market, in Penzance.

She first found her voice as a young schoolgirl, singing in chapel choirs and village halls in the remote communities of West Cornwall. Brenda became active on the Cornish music scene in the early 1960s, taking over the recently formed Count House Folk Music Club at Botallack, near St Just in Penwith in 1967, to found her own Pipers Folk Club, at St Buryan, Cornwall. She was later able to move Pipers back to the Count House, and subsequently into Penzance at the Western Hotel.

== Singing career ==
In 1973 she was introduced to Richard Gendall, who taught her two songs in Cornish to sing at that year's Pan Celtic Festival in Killarney in Ireland, and she welcomed the opportunity to sing in Cornwall's own language, Kernewek, pledging to sing at least one song in Cornish at every concert. Richard wrote over 460 songs for Brenda, over 140 of them in the Cornish language. In 1974, Brenda handed Tremaen Craft Market over to daughter Sue to manage, and turned professional as a singer.

Her early albums were recorded on Cornwall's Sentinel label, often with John the Fish (John Langford), with whom she sang for six years. Brenda later sang with Robert Bartlett and with guitarists Pete Berryman, Mike Silver, Al Fenn, David Penhale and Chris Newman.

Her repertoire over the years covered folk, rock, blues, jazz and even hymns, but she is best remembered for her Cornish "standards" such as Lamorna, The White Rose, Camborne Hill, The Stratton Carol and the ballads Mordonnow, Tamar, Silver Net and Lyonesse, those last three all written by Richard Gendall.

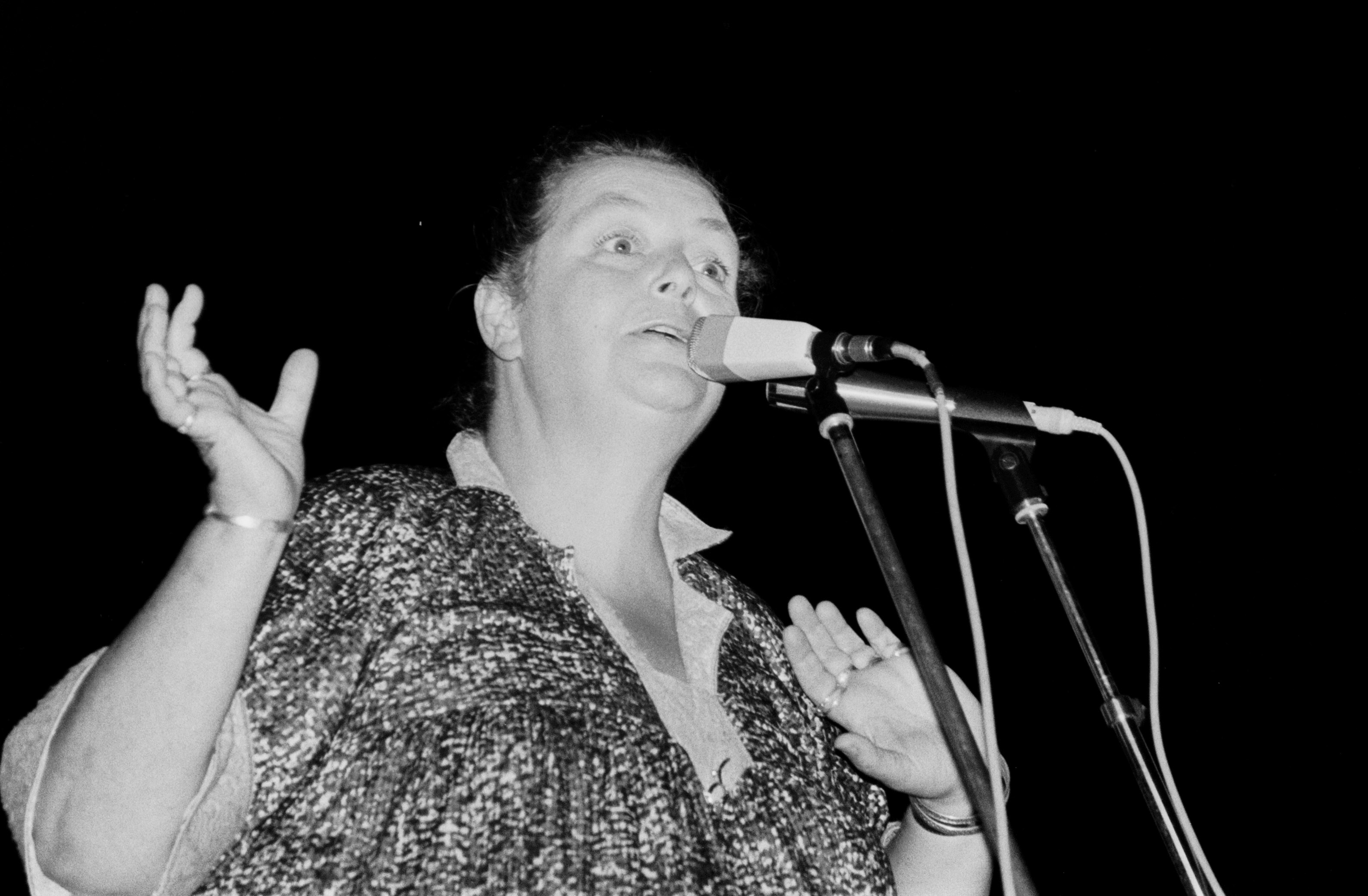
Wootton in concert at Quimperlé, Brittany, in 1980

She was equally at home when singing in Cornish, Breton or English and was as famous in Brittany, which she visited regularly, as she was in her native Cornwall. She appeared in the first ever Lorient Interceltic Festival in Brittany in the early 1970s. Brenda became famous throughout the world where she was welcomed by Cornish exiles and others, and sang at the Kernewek Lowender in South Australia three times, and in Canada, as well as across Europe. She reached number 1 in the pop charts in Japan with the maxi single 'Walk Across the World'.

Brenda was made a bard of the Gorsedh Kernow in 1977, and took as her bardic name Gwylan Gwavas (Gwavas Gull). In her later years, she became well known in Cornwall as a presenter for BBC Radio Cornwall where she hosted the popular weekly request show Sunday Best, until 1990. She was also the Honorary President of Radio Beacon, the hospital radio service for St Lawrences Hospital in Bodmin. She died at her home in Penzance aged 66, in March 1994. She had been ill for about five years, forcing her to gradually withdraw from the music scene.

== Rediscovered Bobino tapes ==
Wootton on the cover of her posthumous 2010 album All of Me, recorded live in Paris in 1984

In 2010 Wootton's recording engineer John Knight rediscovered the analogue master tapes of a live performance from June 1984, at the peak of her international career. The concert, which took place at the Bobino music hall theatre in Paris, featured Wootton with the Camborne Town Band, and musicians Ray Roberts, Dave Freeman and Chris Newman. The recording was subsequently digitally mastered and released as All of Me, featuring nineteen tracks and a sixteen-page booklet of unpublished photographs, many from Wootton's own private collection.

== Legacy ==
In 2017 BBC Radio Cornwall awarded Wootton a blue plaque as Cornwall's best loved 'music legend', voted on by their listeners. In summer 2021, the plaque was erected on the walls of the Count House at Botallack, near St Just, the site of her Pipers Folk Club, and from where her music career began.

Following on from her publication of Brenda's poems Pantomime Stew, in 1995, Wootton's daughter Sue Ellery-Hill has privately produced three new CDs with recordings of Brenda old and new, with many previously unheard songs. In 2018 she published her mother's biography, Brenda: For the Love of Cornwall – the Life and Times of Brenda Wootton, Cornwall's First Lady of Song, and in 2021 she brought out a new songbook with two CDs of Wootton singing in the Cornish language, all written for her mother by Richard Gendall.

== Recordings ==
=== Singles and EPs ===
- "Apple Wine / Silver Net", Transatlantic, 1979
- "Berceuses Celtiques Iles Britanniques" (EP), (with pop-up cover), Le Chant du Monde: 100406, CM 650, 1981
- "Hark the Glad Sound", RCA Victor: PB 61264, 1983
- "Dus Tre" / "Paris – What's in a Name?" (Promo), RCA: DB 61311, 1984
- "Tamar" / "Waiting for the Tide" / "Towl Ros" / "Kenavo Dewgenoughwhy" (French promo), Disc'Az: 1061, 1986
- "Everybody Knows" Maxi Single 45 rpm, Edition23 France, EDM039

=== Albums ===
- Piper's Folk, with John the Fish & Piper's Folk, (Private pressing, produced & distributed by Piper's Folk), 1968
- Pasties & Cream, with John the Fish, Sentinel Records, SENS 1006, 1971
- Way Down to Lamorna, Sentinel, SENS 1056, 1972
- Crowdy Crawn, with Richard Gendall, Sentinel, SENS 1016, 1973
- Pamplemousse, with Robert Bartlett, Barclay (French label), 1973
- No Song To Sing, with Robert Bartlett and "guest" Alex Atterson on piano, Sentinel, SENS 1021, 1974
- Tin in the Stream, with Robert Bartlett, Stockfisch (German label), 1974 (voted West Germany's folk album of the year)
- Starry Gazey Pie, with Robert Bartlett, Sentinel, SENS 1031, 1975
- Children Singing, with Richard Gendall, Sentinel, SENS 1036, 1976
- Carillon, Transatlantic Records, TRA 360, 1979
- Boy Jan ... Cornishman, with David Penhale (voice, guitar and bouzouki) and Richard Gendall (composer), Burlington Records, BURL 005, 1980
- La Grande Cornouaillaise, Burlington Records, BURL 007, 1980
- Gwavas Lake, with The Four Lanes Male Choir, Burlington Records, BURL 008, 1980
- Lyonesse, with David King (acoustic guitar), RCA, PL 70299, 1982
- My Land, RCA, PL 70234, 1983
- B Comme Brenda, Disc'Az (French label), AZ 494, 1985
- Tamar, Disc'Az, AZ 505, 1986
- The Voice of Cornwall, Keltia Musique KMCD67, 1996
- All of Me, with Brenda's Trio and Camborne Town Band Label- Knight Design, Cat. No. KDBWAOM00001 Dec. 2010.
- Brenda at Buryan: Live at Pipers Folk Club St. Buryan 1967 with John the Fish (2013 CD)
- Brenda at Christmas (2017 CD)
- Brenda Sings Ballads (2019 CD)
- Brenda Yn Kernewek: Brenda sings over 30 of Richard Gendall's songs in Cornish (2021 Songbook + 2 CDs)

=== Publications ===
- Pantomime Stew – An Anthology of Poetry, Doggerel and Nonsense (book, 1995, private pub.)
- Brenda: For the Love of Cornwall – The Life & Times of Brenda Wootton, Cornwall's First Lady of Song (biography, 2018, TJINK)
- Brenda Yn Kernewek: Brenda sings over 30 of Richard Gendall's songs in Cornish (songbook +2CDs, 2021)
