= Ceilidh Club =

London dance club

The Ceilidh Club is a dance club in London established in 1998.

The night is based on a traditional Scottish cèilidh. The word ceilidh is Gaelic for ‘gathering’ and describes a social event where people come together and provide entertainment for each other. In more recent times it has become synonymous with dancing to a live band.

The Ceilidh Club operates 2-3 times per month, often on Fridays. Around Burns Night larger events are held where haggis, neeps (turnips) and tatties (potatoes) are served.

The Ceilidh Club has been covered many times in the press including Time Out, Financial Times, The Guardian and the London Evening Standard.
