= Crowns (band) =

English folk punk band

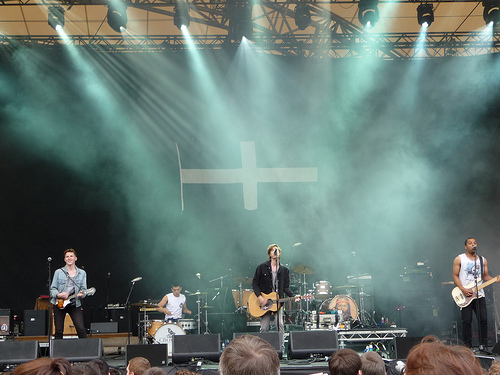
- Crowns performing at the Eden Project

Background information
- Origin: Launceston, Cornwall, England
- Genres: Folk punk
- Years active: 2010–2014
- Labels: Ship Wreckords, PIAS
- Past members: Bill Jefferson; Jake Butler; Jack Speckleton; Rob Ramplin; Nathan Haynes
- Website: Official website

Crowns were an English folk punk band from Launceston, Cornwall, formed in 2010. The band consisted of lead singer and guitarist Bill Jefferson, bass player Jake Butler, mandolinist Jack Speckleton and drummer Rob Ramplin (replaced Nathan Haynes in 2013).

== History ==
=== Formation (2010) ===
Crowns formed in 2010 after moving from Cornwall to London. Their sound is partly inspired by traditional Cornish songs with the band often closing their live shows with a version of Little Eyes.

In July 2010, the band were invited to play a festival at the now defunct North London venue The Flowerpot, curated by the Communion record label. During their closing number the band were joined on stage by Ben Lovett of Mumford & Sons who joined the band on accordion. The live recording of the track was included on the compilation album The Flowerpot Sessions, released by Communion/Island Records in June 2011. At the end of 2010, Crowns were invited by Spider Stacy, tin whistle player in The Pogues to support the band at London's Brixton Academy during their annual Christmas tour.

In July 2011, Crowns played the Eden Project as part of the Eden Sessions gig series, opening the main stage before Mystery Jets and Brandon Flowers. Their version of Bodmin Town, a traditional Cornish song, was included on 'Eden Project - The Album' and released in September 2011.

In March 2012, Crowns released their first EP, Full Swing, featuring 6 tracks.

In January 2013, Crowns opened for The Dropkick Murphys at the London shows on their European tour.

=== Kissing Gates (2011) ===
On 22 September, Crowns announced the release of their debut single 'Kissing Gates' on their own imprint 'Ship Wreckords' and distributed by PIAS. Released on 14 November 2011, the single was made available on limited edition 7" vinyl record and digital download. Radio support for the single has been strong with XFM's John Kennedy making the track his 'X-Posure Hot One' in addition to plays on Zane Lowe and Mike Davies Punk Rock show on BBC Radio 1.

In November 2011, Crowns were invited to support The King Blues on their UK tour alongside Cerebral Ballzy.

=== Stitches in the Flag (2012) ===
On 29 October 2012, Crowns released the single "Parting in the Porch", which is a song from their upcoming album, Stitches in the Flag.

Stitches in the Flag was released on 5 November 2012 and was positively received.

=== Split (2014) ===
Crowns played their final show in September 2014.

== Discography ==
- Full Swing (2012)
- Stitches in the Flag (2012)
