= Dalla =

Cornish folk band

- Origin: Tregajorran, Cornwall, England
- Genres: Folk, world, celtic
- Years active: Late 1990s–2017
- Label: Dalla Records
- Members: Hilary Coleman; Neil Davey; Bec Applebee; Jen Dyer; Kyt Le Nen Davey
- Past members: Simon Lockley; Steve Hunt
- Website: http://www.dalla.co.uk

Dalla was a band specialising in traditional Cornish music who were active from the late 1990s until about 2017. They were known mainly for their festival and concert performances, but until about 2013 also played music for Cornish Nos Lowen dance nights. After this, they used the name 'Skillywidden' when playing as a dance band. Skillywidden continues to be one of the main Nos Lowen dance bands.

Members play the clarinet, bouzouki, fiddle, viola, accordion and percussion. They sing in both Cornish and English.

Various members of Dalla formerly played in Bucca (a Cornish band named for the supernatural sea deities called Bucca), Sowena, Anao Atao and other bands. The music displays influences from these previous sounds. Dalla often appear with many additional instruments, which vary from event to event.

== Origins ==
Dalla had its roots in 'The Jack and Jenny Band'. In 1999 they became Sowena, and two years later, the band underwent a second transformation as remaining additional members left and Neil Davey joined to complete the classic Dalla sound. Dalla's Myspace profile cites a wide range of influences.

== Influence ==
Dalla has greatly influenced Cornish music, encouraging the formation of 'Noze looan' bands, particularly by younger people and influencing bands such as Pentorr and Tezen Koynt.

They have been involved in numerous Cornish music projects, run by Cumpas such as 'kick up your heels' in which young people from across Cornwall played in a large underground concert at Carnglaze Caverns, or the 'crowders and horners' project, to encourage processional Cornish music and dance.

== Review ==
In the Cornish Guardian, Bert Biscoe wrote "There is an intelligence that inhabits and underpins the various activities of Dalla..."

== Members ==
- Hilary Coleman, clarinet, bass clarinet, vocals
- Neil Davey, fiddle, bouzouki
- Bec Applebee, vocals, crowdy crawn and other percussion
- Jen Dyer, viola, vocals
- Kyt Le Nen Davey, accordion
- Simon Lockley and Steve Hunt are former members of the group.

Although Dalla has a core of two to three members they rarely perform without additional musicians, and on such occasions when there are only two they are usually referred to as the 'dalla duo'.

== Discography ==
=== Albums ===
- A Richer Vein (2001)
- More Salt/Hollan Mouy (2004)
- Rooz (2007)
- Cribbar (2010)
- K5 (2013)
