= Come, all ye jolly tinner boys =

Traditional folk song

"Come, all ye jolly tinner boys" is a traditional folk song associated with Cornwall that was written about 1807, when Napoleon Bonaparte made threats that would affect trade in Cornwall at the time of the invasion of Poland. The song contains the line Why forty thousand Cornish boys shall knawa the reason why.

According to Cornish historian Robert Morton Nance, it was possibly the inspiration for R. S. Hawker's "The Song of the Western Men" which was written in 1824 and contains a strikingly similar line: Here's twenty thousand Cornish men will know the reason why!

== Lyrics ==
Come, all ye jolly Tinner boys, and listen to me;
I'll tell ее of a storie shall make ye for to see,
Consarning Boney Peartie, the schaames which he had maade
To stop our tin and copper mines, and all our pilchard traade.

Chorus- Hurea for tin and copper, boys, and fisheries likewise!
Hurea for Cornish maadens-Oh, bless their pretty eyes!
Hurea for our ould gentrie, and may they never faale!
Hurea, hurea for Cornwall! Hurea, boys, "one and ale!"

He summonsed forty thousand men, to Polland they did goa,
And for to rob and plunder there you very well do knawa;
But ten-thou-sand were killed, and laade dead in blood and goare,
And thirty thousand ranned away, and I cante tell where, I'm sure.

And should that Boney Peartie have forty thousand still
To make into an army to work his wicked will,
And try for to invaade us, if he doesn't quickly fly—
Why forty thousand Cornish boys shall knawa the reason why.
