= Nos lowen =

Cornish dance

Nos lowen (former spelling noze looan) is a style of Cornish-Celtic dance, and associated music and events similar in style to the Breton fest noz but featuring only Cornish dances. nos lowen is Cornish for 'happy night'.

Nos lowen is a relatively recent development in Cornish music and dance, which started in the 1990s, some twenty years after the beginning of the revival of Cornish dancing generally. It may be a reaction to the more formal approaches of the earlier revival, in which the social dance night, known as the troyl, presented the Cornish dances in the style of a Scottish or Irish cèilidh. The nos lowen approach on the other hand was inspired by the Breton fest noz format, which itself had emerged in the 1960s. Both nos lowen and fest noz were new ways of celebrating what were often quite ancient dances from their respective regions. Nos lowen was initially spearheaded by the Cornish group Sowena, and traditional dancers. It places greater emphasis on simpler dances, which are also often the oldest ones, such as snake dances and furry dances, in order to increase participation and remove the need for a caller. The nos lowen movement continues to enjoy much success in Cornwall as does the troyl approach.

While nos lowen is essentially a dance style, an associated style of music has grown around it which is generally more progressive than many folk bands, possibly to appeal to a younger audience. It also places more emphasis on rhythms and longer songs in order to produce the tribal trance-like state associated with the repetitive dances. Proponents include Tredanek, Dalla, Davey & Dyer, and Heb Mar.

The proper Cornish plural of nos lowen is nosow lowen, but people often simply say "nos lowens" when speaking English, in the same way people might pluralise "ceilidhs" in English. Nos lowen is sometimes abbreviated as "nsl" online or in event listings. The earlier spelling noze looan was based on the Late Cornish orthography; with the introduction of the Standard Written Cornish, the spelling nos lowen is now used.

== See also ==
- Cèilidh
- Culture of Cornwall
- Feis
- Fest noz
- Noson llawen, a Welsh equivalent
- Troyl
- Twmpath, another similar Welsh gathering
