= Tremaen pottery =

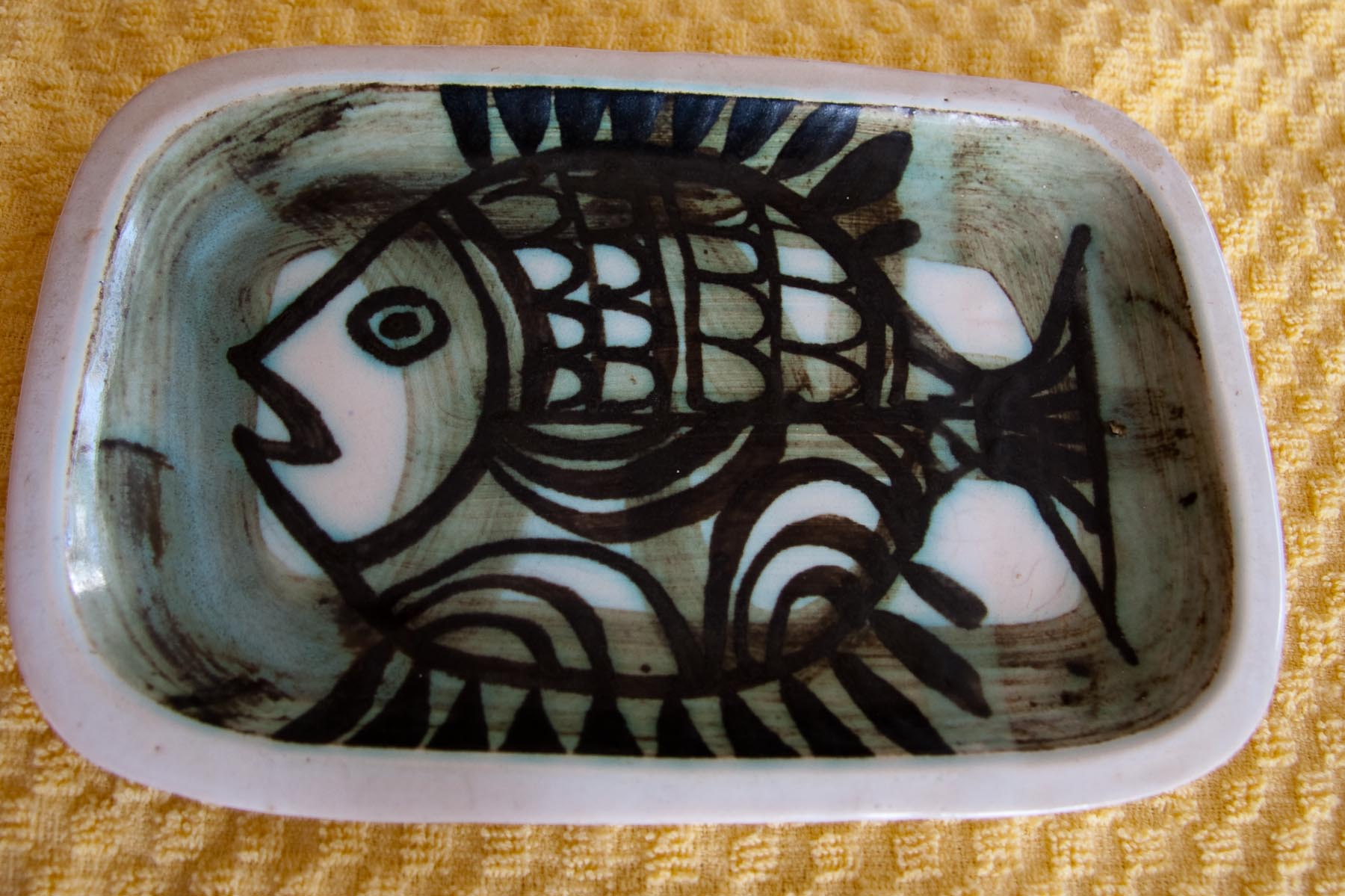
A Tremaen pottery fish dish

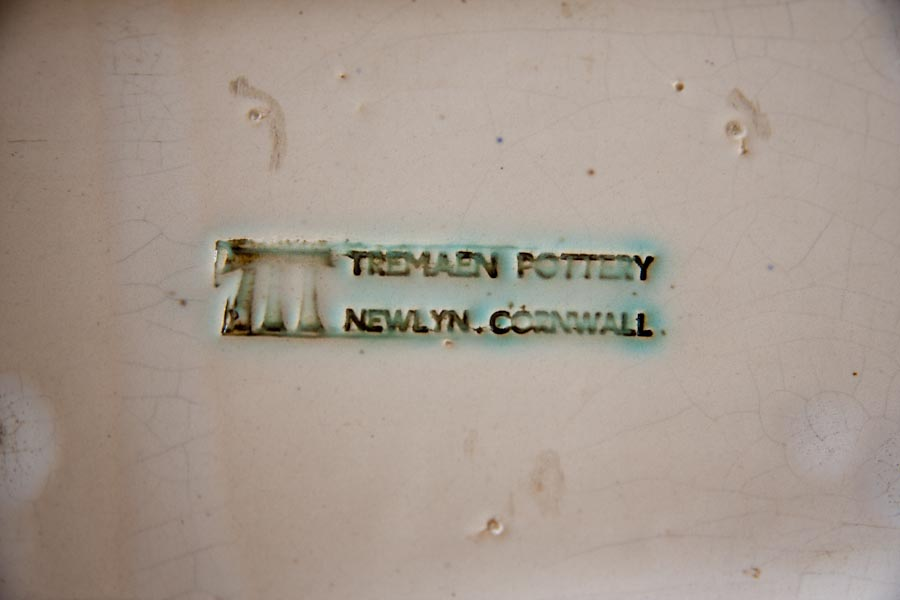
A Tremaen pottery backstamp

The Tremaen pottery was established in 1965 in Marazion, Cornwall, by Peter Ellery, the brother of Brenda Wootton, the Cornish poet and folk singer. Ellery was not a potter, having trained as an artist at Bath College. Despite this, his unconventional style became a commercial success and in 1967 the pottery moved to Newlyn in order to expand its workforce to 12. However, by 1988 the economic situation made Ellery decide to close the pottery, and he spent the last ten years of his life painting.

The pottery is best known for its lamps, "pebble" vases and dishes decorated with hand-painted fish.
