= Serpent dance =

Traditional Cornish dance associated with the Midsummer festival of Golowan

The serpent dance is a traditional Cornish dance associated with the Midsummer festival of Golowan and Cornish cultural events such as nos lowen (earlier spelling noze looan).

detailed description of the Golowan serpent dance form An Daras the Cornish culture website.

Below is a description of the dance as performed in the Golowan fire festival in Penzance in the 19th century from J S Courtney's A Guide to Penzance and Its Neighbourhood (1845):

"The proceedings finished by the boys and girls from the quay, whose torches had by this time expired, dancing in a long line hand-in-hand through the streets, in and out and sometimes over the now low burning tar-barrels, crying out, "An eye, an eye". At this shout the top couple held up their arms and beginning with the last the others ran under them thus reversing their position."
