= Stitches in the Flag =

Studio album by Crowns
- Released: (United Kingdom) 5 November 2012
- Genres: Folk punk, Celtic punk
- Length: 30:32
- Label: Ship Wreckords
- Producer: Tim Goalen

Crowns chronology
Full Swing (2012)	Stitches in the Flag (2012)

Professional ratings
Review scores
Source	Rating
BBC	(mixed)

Stitches in the Flag is the debut album from four-piece English folk punk band Crowns.

The album features a re-recorded version of the title track from their first EP Full Swing.

== Track listing ==
All music is composed by Crowns.

No.	Title	Length
1.	"Stitches in the Flag"	2:10
2.	"Four Walls"	3:02
3.	"China Clay"	3:45
4.	"My London"	3:30
5.	"Full Swing"	3:02
6.	"She Gets Me (Where I Wanna Be)"	2:24
7.	"Boscastle Breakdown"	1:42
8.	"Windmill Hill"	1:57
9.	"Parting in the Porch"	2:50
10.	"Safe Train Home"	3:06
11.	"Little Eyes"	3:09
Total length:		30:32

== Personnel ==
Crowns

- Bill Jefferson - vocals/guitar
- Jake Butler - bass/backing vocals
- Jack Speckleton - mandolin/backing vocals
- Nathan Haynes - drums/backing vocals
