= Cèilidh =

Irish and Scottish social gathering

A cèilidh dance in Alexandria, Virginia, United States

A cèilidh (/ˈkeɪli/ KAY-lee, anglicised to "ceilidh", Scottish Gaelic: [ˈkʲʰeːlɪ]) or céilí (Irish: [ˈceːlʲiː]) is a traditional Scottish and Irish social gathering. In its most basic form, it simply means a social visit. In contemporary usage, it usually involves dancing and playing Gaelic folk music, either at a home or a larger concert at a social hall or other community gathering place.

Cèilidhean (plural of cèilidh) and céilithe (plural of céilí) originated in the Gaelic areas of Scotland and Ireland and are consequently common in the Scottish and Irish diasporas. They are similar to the troyl traditions in Cornwall and twmpath and noson lawen events in Wales, merry neets in Cumbria and North East England, as well as English country dance throughout England which have in some areas undergone a fusion with céilithe.

== Etymology ==
The term is derived from the Old Irish céle (singular) meaning 'companion'. It later became céilidh and céilidhe, which means 'visit' in Gaelic. In Scottish Gaelic reformed spelling it is spelt cèilidh (plural cèilidhean) and in Irish reformed spelling as céilí (plural céilithe).

== History ==
Originally, a cèilidh was a social gathering of any sort, and did not necessarily involve dancing:

The 'ceilidh' is a literary entertainment where stories and tales, poems and ballads, are rehearsed and recited, and songs are sung, conundrums are put, proverbs are quoted, and many other literary matters are related and discussed

— Carmichael, Alexander, Carmina Gadelica, 1900, tome I, p. xxviii.

The ceilidh of the Western Hebrides corresponds to the veillée of Lower Brittany ... and to similar story-telling festivals which formerly flourished among all the Celtic peoples

— Wentz, W. Y. Evans, The Fairy-faith in Celtic countries, Oxford University Press, 1911, p. 32.

On long, dark winter nights it is still the custom in small villages for friends to collect in a house and hold what they call a "ceilidh" (pronounced kay'lee). Young and old are entertained by the reciters of old poems and legendary stories which deal with ancient beliefs, the doings of traditional heroes and heroines, and so on. Some sing old and new songs set to old music or new music composed in the manner of the old.

— Mackenzie, Donald A., Wonder Tales from Scottish Myth and Legend, 1917, p. 14.

In recent decades, the dancing portion of the event has usurped the older meanings of the term, though the tradition of guests performing music, songs, storytelling, and poetry still persists in some areas.

Céilithe/Cèilidhean were originally hosted by a fear-an-tigh (or, in contemporary Scottish Gaelic orthography, fear-an-taighe), meaning 'man of the house'. The Scottish Gaelic feminine and gender-neutral equivalents are bean-an-taighe (woman of the house) and duine-an-taighe (person of the house), respectively. The use of these or similar terms is still the form in much of Ireland and Hebridean Scotland, and at gatherings elsewhere at which either Irish or Scottish Gaelic is the predominant social language. In modern events at which English predominates, the host is usually instead referred to as simply the "host" or "master of ceremonies".

== Modern cèilidhean ==
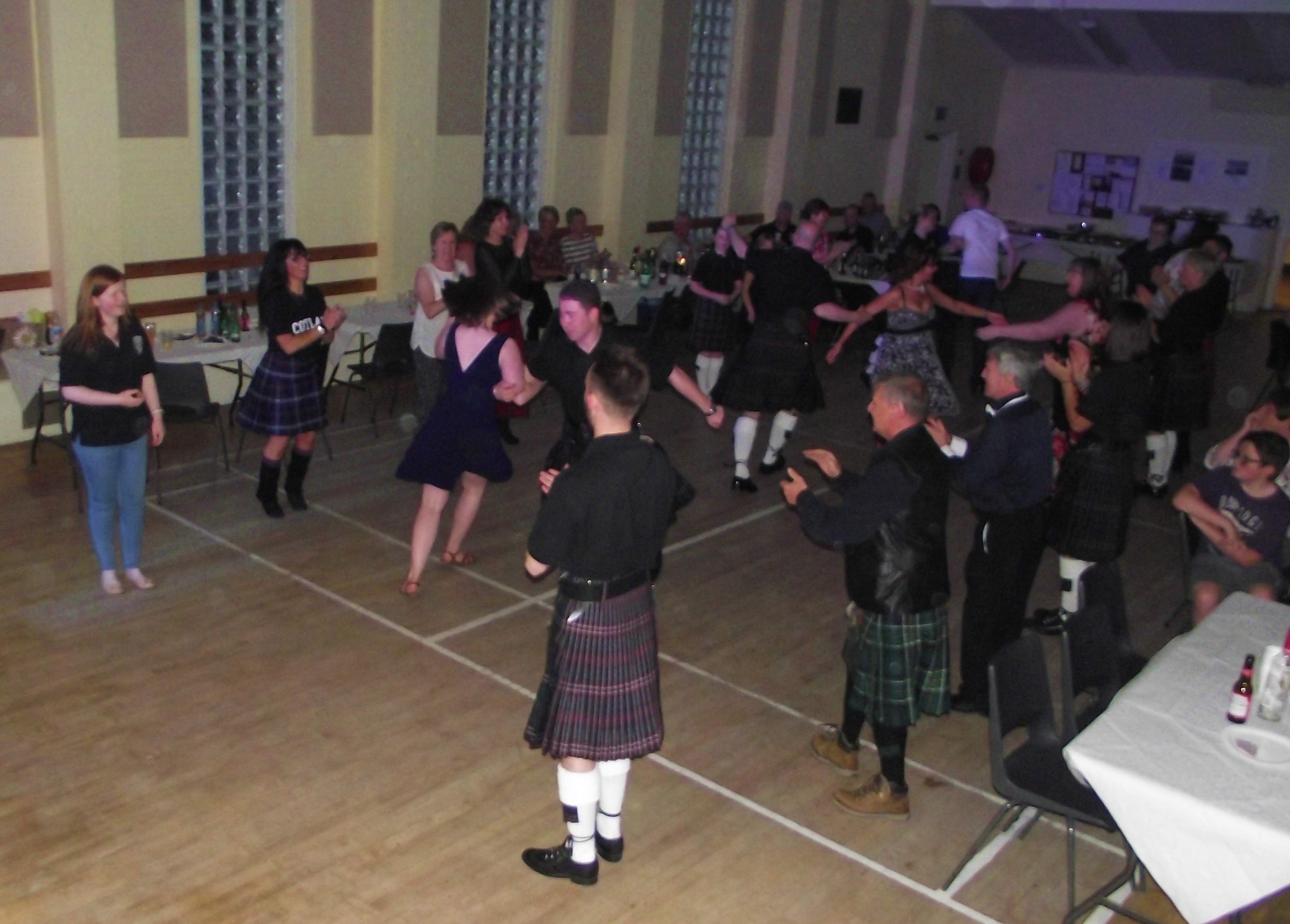
The Northern Constabulary Pipe Band Fundraising Cèilidh at North Kessock, Scotland

The cèilidh facilitated courting and prospects of marriage for young people and, although discos and nightclubs have displaced the cèilidh to a considerable extent, such events are still an important and popular social outlet in rural parts of Scotland and Ireland, especially in the Gaelic-speaking regions. Cèilidhean are sometimes held on a smaller scale in private or public houses, for example in remote rural areas and during busy festivals.

It is common for some clubs and institutions such as sports clubs, schools and universities and even employers to arrange cèilidhs on a regular—or at least annual—basis. The formality of these can vary. Some mix modern pop music with a Scottish country dancing band and dress codes range from compulsory highland dress to informal. Knowledge and use of the basic dance steps is not always strictly necessary, and dances often alternate with songs, poetry recitals, storytelling and other types of "party pieces".

Cèilidh music may be provided by an assortment of instruments including fiddle, flute, tin whistle, accordion, bodhrán (frame-drum), hammered dulcimer, and in more recent times also drums, guitar, mandolin, bouzouki, Scottish smallpipes, and electric bass guitar. The music is cheerful and lively, consisting in Ireland mainly of jigs, reels, hornpipes, polkas, slip-jigs, and waltzes, with Scotland adding strathspeys, and England adding regional forms such as the northeastern rant. The basic steps can be learned easily; a short instructional session is often provided for new dancers before the start of the dance itself. In Ireland, the first céilí band was put together in 1926 by Séamus Clandillon, Radio Éireann's director of music, to have dance music for his studio-based programmes.

Dancing at cèilidhean is usually in the form of cèilidh dances, set dances, or couples' dances. A "set" consists of four to eight couples, with each pair of couples facing another in a square or rectangular formation. Each couple exchanges position with the facing couple, and also facing couples exchange partners, while all the time keeping in step with the beat of the music.

About half of the dances in the modern Scots cèilidh, however, are couples' dances performed in a ring. These can be performed by fixed couples or in the more sociable "progressive" manner, with the lady moving to the next gentleman in the ring at or near the end of each repetition of the steps. In Ireland, the similar style of dance is called céilí dance or fíor ('true') céilí dance. Some of the dances are named after famous regiments, historical battles, and events, others after items of daily rural life. The "gay Gordons", "siege of Ennis", "walls of Limerick", and "stack of barley" are popular dances in this genre.

Step dancing is another form of dancing often performed at céilithe, the form that was popularised in the 1990s by the Riverdance ensemble. Whereas set dancing involves all present, whatever their skill, step dancing is usually reserved for show, being performed only by the most talented of dancers.

The cèilidh has been internationalised by the Scottish and Irish diasporas in Canada, the United States, Australia, and New Zealand, where local cèilidhean and traditional music competitions are held. In recent years, cèilidh and traditional music competitions have been frequently won by descendants of emigrants.

It bears mention that cèilidhean are common throughout Nova Scotia. The tradition and the spirit of these gatherings are carried on in most small communities of these Maritime Provinces.

=== In Scotland ===
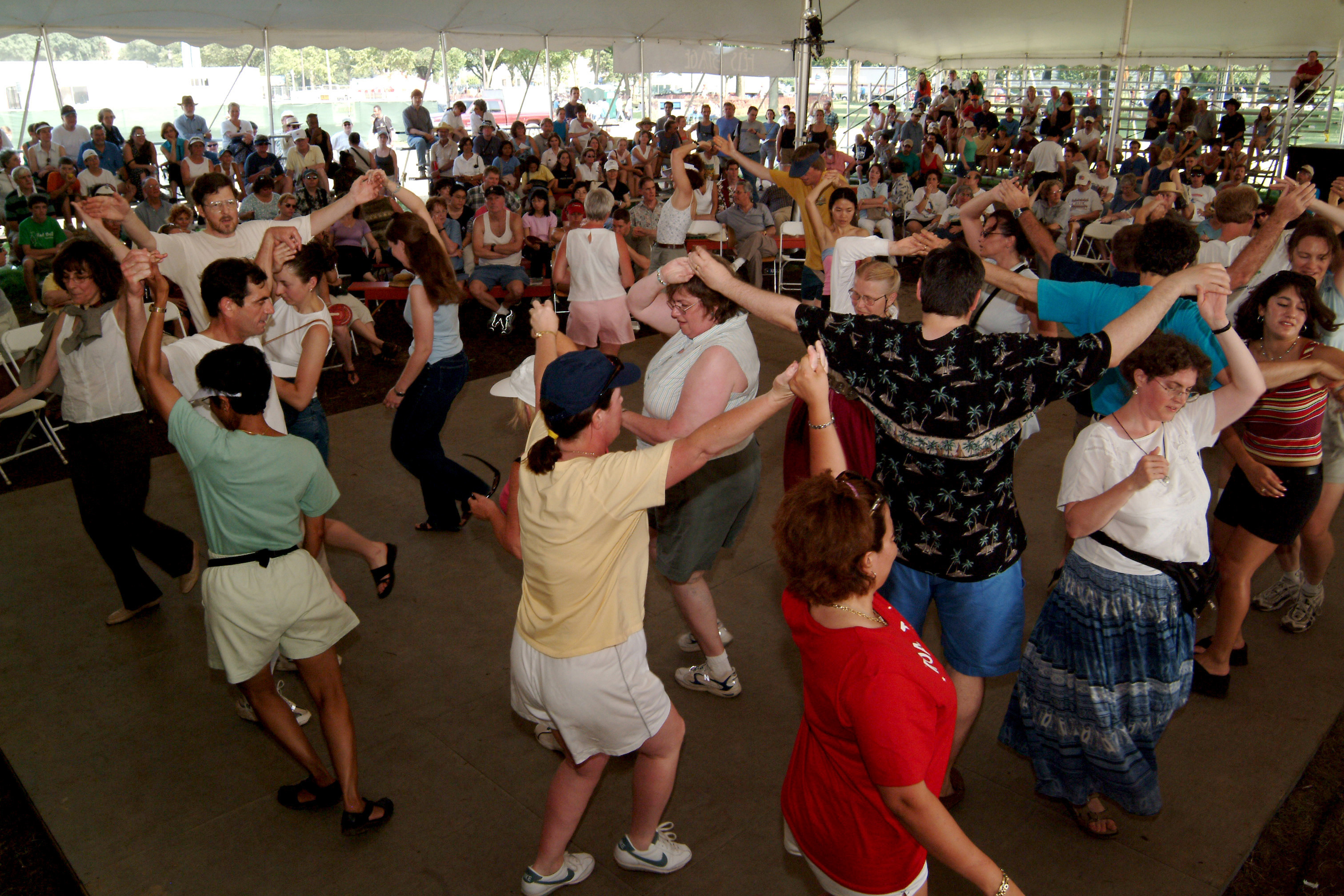
Scottish cèilidh dancing at the 2003 Smithsonian Folklife Festival (Washington, DC)

Privately organised cèilidhean in the 2020s are extremely common in both rural and urban Scotland, where bands are hired, usually for evening entertainment for a wedding, birthday party, celebratory or fundraising event. These may be more or less formal, and very often omit all other traditional Gaelic activity beyond the actual music and dancing. Novices are usually among the participants, so a "dance caller" may teach the steps before music begins for each dance. The more versatile bands will demonstrate the dances too. Scottish primary schools frequently teach some Scottish country dancing, often around Christmas time. Bands vary in size but are commonly made up of between two and six players. The appeal of the Scottish cèilidh is by no means limited to the younger generation, and dances vary in speed and complexity to accommodate most age groups and levels of ability. Most private schools in Scotland will also hold cèilidhean on a fairly regular basis.

Public cèilidhean are also held, attracting paying participants, often held at dance clubs; and the annual Ceilidh Culture festival in Edinburgh.

Universities in Scotland hold regular cèilidhean, with the University of Edinburgh providing a number for students throughout each term, especially the long-running Highland Annual, the oldest cèilidh in Edinburgh and the largest in Scotland, organised by the Highland Society (An Comann Ceilteach). Glasgow University Union's annual debating competition, Glasgow Ancients, traditionally ends the night with a cèilidh. The union's Christmas event, Daft Friday, also involves a cèilidh. Cèilidhean are common fundraising and social events for many societies at the University of Glasgow.

Some cèilidh bands intersperse cèilidh dancing with a DJ playing disco music to broaden the appeal of the evening's entertainment.

=== In Ireland ===
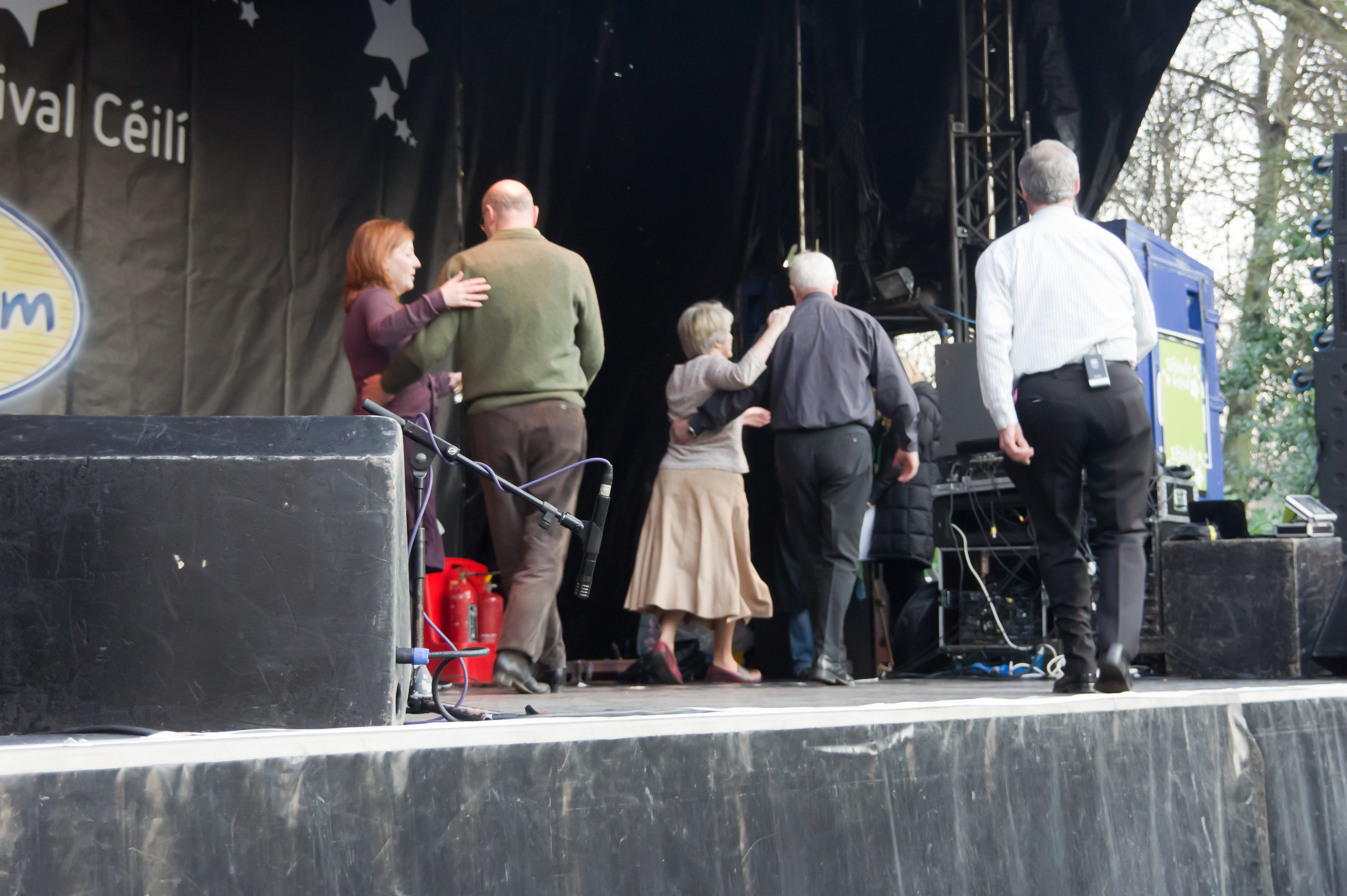
Céilí dancing

Céilí dances (/ˈkeɪli/, Irish: [ˈceːlʲiː]) or true céilí dances (fíor céilí) are a popular form of folk dancing in Ireland and are part of the broader Irish dances. The Irish céilí dances are based on heys ("hedges", or pairs of facing lines), round dances, long dances, and quadrilles, generally revived during the Gaelic revival in the first quarter of the twentieth century and codified by the Irish Dancing Commission. There are about thirty dances that form the basis for examination of céilí dance teachers. Irish céilí is a participatory social event attended by both men and women and accompanied by live Irish traditional music. The dance emerged within cultural nationalist consciousness as during the late 19th and early 20th century traditions promoting nationalist agendas, and national identities were regarded as not culturally unified.

==== History and background ====
Irish céilí regained its popularity in the late 19th century, when Ireland made efforts to regain its cultural and political autonomy after being colonized for more than 800 years. The goal of the Gaelic League established in 1893 was to promote Irish cultural independence and de-anglicisation, which involved the remergent popularization of the Irish language, literature, and vernacular traditions, such as Irish singing and dancing. Plentiful branches of the Gaelic League giving dance, singing, music, and literature classes were established across Ireland.

==== Dance form and style ====
The style of dance employed for céilí dance differs greatly from that used for set dance, and has more the appearance associated with the style of step dance. In particular, it emphasizes height and extension, with dancers generally dancing on their toes (but not en pointe as in ballet). A movement called "side-step" or "sevens and threes" with which dancers travel sideways to the direction they are facing is common, as are jig-step movements called the "rising step" or "grinding step". Céilí dances may be divided into figures, but a single type of tune is generally used for all the figures and the dancing does not pause between the figures.

Unlike square dance and round dance, céilí dances are generally not called by a caller; the flow of dance is defined by its name.

==== Social ceili dances ====
Céilí dances when performed socially are often performed in a progressive style. At the end of one whole iteration of the dance (lead around and body), instead of stopping, the groups move on to the next set of partners in the line. Céilí dances that can be performed progressively are: walls of Limerick, siege of Ennis, haymaker's jig, and fairy reel. When there is a large social gathering, there will often be a caller for the dance, though it is a very different style from square-dancing caller. A céilí caller is usually the teacher or most experienced dancer of the group who has the dance memorized. They then call the movements out in a non-stylized way, intended to remind those who are non-dancers when and where to move. Social céilí dances are often the easiest dances and very easy to shuffle through as a non-dancer. A caller makes sure that everyone at a social dance can participate. Embellishments are accepted and fun in social céilí dances, women adding spins or changing the style of a swing based on the skill of a partner.

Diagram of movement in progressive ceili dance:
Walls of Limerick

First dance position	Progressed position	Next progressed position
	Couple 2
Couple 1		Couple 2
Couple 2	Couple 1	Couple 4
	Couple 4
Couple 3		Couple 1
Couple 4	Couple 3	Couple 6
	Couple 6
Couple 5		Couple 3
Couple 6	Couple 5	Couple 5

=== Similar gatherings in England ===
Cèilidh in England has evolved a little differently from its counterparts in Scotland and Ireland. English cèilidh, usually called ceilidh, without the e-grave but pronounced as it is in Scottish Gaelic, can be considered part of English country dance (and related to contra dance). English ceilidh has many things in common with the Scottish and Irish social dance traditions. The dance figures are similar using couples' dances, square sets, long sets, and circle dances. However, the English style requires a slower tempo of tune accentuating the on-beat, the central instrument often being the English melodeon, a diatonic accordion in the keys of D and G. Dancers often use a skip, a step-hop or rant step depending on region. This contrasts with the smoother style and more fluid motion seen in Ireland, Scotland, or (the walking) in contra. Many ceilidh dances involve a couple, but this does not limit the number of partners any one dancer has during the ceilidh. Often dancers will change partners every dance to meet new people.

An important part of English ceilidhs is the "caller" who instructs the dancer in the next dance. An experienced ceilidh caller understands the mechanics of the tunes and regional dances from the UK and beyond. They will confer with the band about what type of tune to play for the dance. This aids the selection of the right dance for the right audience, and is a skill is sought after in the south of England where callers are famous in their own right. Many bands have their own caller, often also an instrumentalist; some have two.

During an English ceilidh there is often an interval involving the talents of local Morris or rapper side; this also serves to give band members a rest.

It is possible to see many diverse and regionally distinct acts at a modern English ceilidh. Acts range from the most traditional, like the Old Swan Band, to the most experimental like the electronic dance music-influenced Monster Ceilidh Band. Many other forms of music have been combined with English ceilidh music including; Irish music from the band Phoenix Ceilidh Band; ska from the band Whapweasel; traditional jazz from the bands Chalktown and Florida; funk fusion from Licence to Ceilidh, Ceilidhography, and Climax Ceilidh Band, rock from the bands Peeping Tom, Aardvark Ceilidh Band, Touchstone, and Tickled Pink; West African- and Indian-influenced music from the band Boka Halattraditional; traditional French music from the band Token Women; traditional Welsh music from Twm Twp; and heavy metal from Glorystrokes.

== See also ==
- Hootenanny
- Troyl
- Feis
- Fest noz
- Fleadh Cheoil
- Nos lowen
- Noson llawen

== Bibliography ==
- John Cullinane: Aspects of the History of Irish Céilí Dancing, The Central Remedial Clinic, Clontarf, Dublin 3,(1998), ISBN 0-9527952-2-1
- An Coimisiún le Rincí Gaelacha: Ár Rincí Fóirne-Thirty Popular Céilí Dances, Westside Press (2003)
- J. G. O' Keeffe, Art O' Brien: A Handbook of Irish Dances, 1. Edition, Gill & Son Ltd., (1902)
- Helen Brennan: The Story of Irish Dance, Mount Eagle Publications Ltd., 1999 ISBN 0-86322-244-7
