= Richard John Maddern-Williams =

British composer

Richard John Maddern-Williams FRCO (1885 – 1955) was a music teacher and organist based in Norwich.

== Life ==
He was born in Pendeen, Cornwall in 1885 to Edward Stevens Williams and Esther Thomas Maddern. He received his first organ lessons from F. W. Searle of Penzance. At age 16 he entered the Royal College of Music, where he studied under Sir Walter Parratt, Walter Galpin Alcock, F.J. Read and Stevenson Hoyte.

Whilst in Norwich he was Music Master at the Norwich High School for Boys, and also Music Master for the Norwich Pageant in 1912.

In 1942, he was made a bard of the Cornish Gorseth for services to music in Cornwall.

== Appointments ==
- Organist at Church of St Cuthbert, Wells 1904 - 1906
- Assistant Organist at Wells Cathedral 1904 - 1906
- Nave Organist at Wells Cathedral 1906 - 1908
- Organist at St Peter Mancroft Norwich 1908 - 1922
- Organist at St Peter Mancroft Norwich 1926 - 1941
- Organist of St. Paul's Church, Penzance 1941 - 1955?
- Conductor of the Penzance Orchestral Society 1942 - 1946

== Compositions ==
He arranged six old Cornish Christmas Carols for men's voices.

He also composed a Magnificat and Nunc Dimittis.
