= The Song of the Western Men =

Cornish patriotic song

Trelawny
English: "The Song of the Western Men"
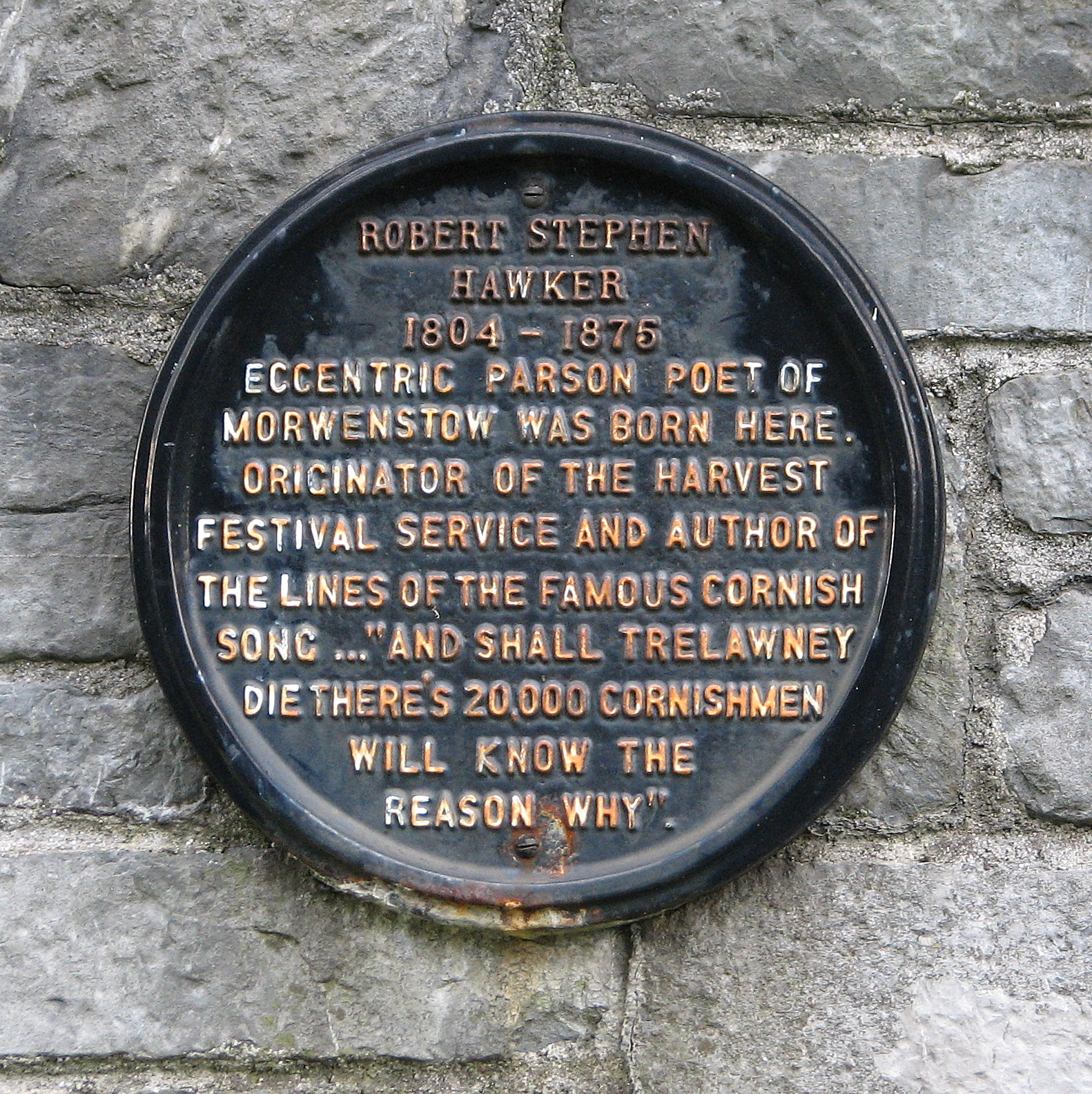
- Plaque commemorating R. S. Hawker at Charles Church, Plymouth
- Unofficial national anthem of Cornwall
- Lyrics: Robert Stephen Hawker, 1826
- Music: Louisa T. Clare, 1861

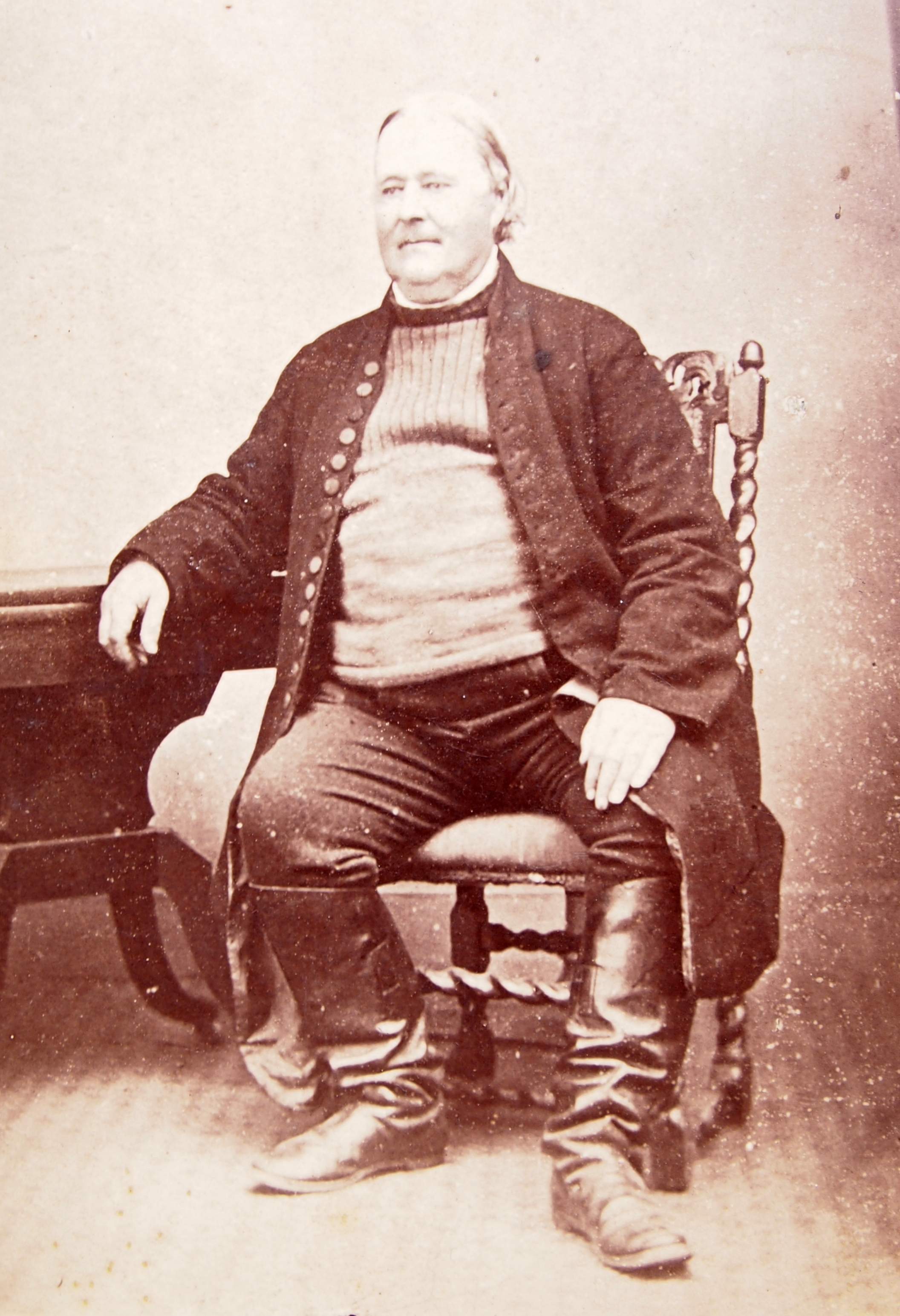
Robert Stephen Hawker

"The Song of the Western Men", also known as "Trelawny", is a Cornish patriotic song, composed by Louisa T. Clare for lyrics by Robert Stephen Hawker. The poem was first published anonymously in The Royal Devonport Telegraph and Plymouth Chronicle in September 1826, over 100 years after the events.

== Background ==
Hawker, a churchman, claimed authorship for the words except for the chorus. He assumed that the Trelawny mentioned in those three lines was Sir Jonathan Trelawny, the Bishop of Bristol, who had been imprisoned in the Tower of London by King James II in 1688. However it is more likely that it referred to his grandfather, Sir John Trelawny, a Cornish Royalist leader who had been imprisoned by parliament in 1628. The people of Cornwall did not actually march to rescue Trelawny, as told in the song. He was imprisoned in the Tower of London for three weeks, then tried and acquitted.

Hawker's poem was set to music by Louisa T. Clare in 1861. Hawker was so pleased with Clare's setting, that he sent her another poem of his in hopes of a further success.

According to Cornish historian Robert Morton Nance, "The Song of the Western Men" was possibly inspired by the song "Come, all ye jolly tinner boys" which was written more than ten years earlier in about 1807, when Napoleon Bonaparte made threats that would affect trade in Cornwall at the time of the invasion of Poland. "Ye jolly tinner boys" contains the line "Why forty thousand Cornish boys shall know the reason why."

In 1881, at the laying of the foundation stone of the Cathedral at Truro, the song was described by Canon Harvey as "... the national anthem of our dear Cornwall." The song is a regular favourite sung at Cornish rugby union matches and other Cornish gatherings. In some schools in Cornwall, the children are taught the first verse and chorus, and sing it at events such as Murdoch Day and St Piran's Day (5 March). Since 2016 the latter occasion has also seen the "Trelawny Shout" – the song being sung in pubs across Cornwall for charity.

== "Trelawny" ==
A good sword and a trusty hand!
A merry heart and true!
King James's men shall understand
What Cornish lads can do!
And have they fixed the where and when?
And shall Trelawny die?
Here's twenty thousand Cornish men
Will know the reason why!

And shall Trelawny live?
Or shall Trelawny die?
Here's twenty thousand Cornish men
Will know the reason why!

Out spake their Captain brave and bold:
A merry wight was he:
Though London Tower were Michael's hold,
We'll set Trelawny free!
We'll cross the Tamar, land to land:
The Severn is no stay:
With "one and all," and hand in hand;
And who shall bid us nay?

And shall Trelawny live?
Or shall Trelawny die?
Here's twenty thousand Cornish men
Will know the reason why!

And when we come to London Wall,
A pleasant sight to view,
Come forth! come forth! ye cowards all:
Here's men as good as you.
Trelawny he's in keep and hold;
Trelawny he may die:
Here's twenty thousand Cornish bold
Will know the reason why

And shall Trelawny live?
Or shall Trelawny die?
Here's twenty thousand Cornish men
Will know the reason why!

== Translation into Cornish ==
There are two versions of the song in Cornish. The first was written by Henry Jenner in 1905:

'Ma lel an leuv, 'ma'n kledha mas
'Ma'n golon lowen, gwir!
Tus Mytern Jams 'wra konvedhes
Pandr'yll Kernowyon sur!

Yw ornys le ha prys ankow?
'Verow Trelawny bras?
Mes ugans mil a dus Kernow
A wodhvydh oll an kas.

'Verow Trelawny bras?
'Verow Trelawny bras?
Mes ugens mil a dus Kernow
A wodhvydh oll an kas.

'Medh aga Hapten, krev ha dreus,
Gwas lowen ev a veu,
"A pe Tour Loundres Karrek Loos,
Ni a'n kergh mes a'n le."

"Ni 'dres an Tamar, tir dhe dir,
A pe 'vel Havren down,
Onan hag oll, dhe'n den eus fur;
Dhe'gan lettya 'fedh own."

'Verow Trelawny bras?
'Verow Trelawny bras?
Mes ugens mil a dus Kernow
A wodhvydh oll an kas.

"Pan wrellen dos dhe Fos Loundres,
Dhe wel a bleg dhyn ni;
Ownegyon oll, gwrewgh dos yn-mes
Dhe dus eus gwell eso'hwi!”

"Yn karhar kelmys rag ankow
Mirowgh Trelawny bras!
Mes ugans mil a dus Kernow
A wodhvydh oll an kas."

'Verow Trelawny bras?
'Verow Trelawny bras?
Mes ugens mil a dus Kernow
A wodhvydh oll an kas.

Gans kledha da ha dorn yw lel,
Gwir lowen an golon
Yth aswon Mytern Jamys fel
Pandr'wrello Kernowyon.
Yw ordnys prys ha le ankow?
'Verow Trelawny bras?
Ottomma ugens mil Gernow
A wodhvydh oll an kas.

'Verow Trelawny bras?
'Verow Trelawny bras?
Ottomma ugens mil Gernow
A wodhvydh oll an kas!

Yn-medh an kapten, byw y woos,
Gwas joliv yn mesk kans:
"Tour Loundres kyn fe Karrek Loos
Y’n delirvsen dehwans.
Ni a dres Tamar, tir dhe dir,
An Havren ny’gan lett;
Ha skoodh reb skoodh, kowetha wir,
Piw orthyn ni a sett?

‘Verow Trelawny bras?
‘Verow Trelawny bras?
Ottomma ugens mil Gernow
A wodhvydh oll an kas!

Devedhys bys yn fos Loundres
"Gwel teg dhyn" ni a gri;
"Dewgh mes, ownegyon oll, dewgh mes,
Gwell dus on esowgh hwi!"
Trelawny yw avel felon
Fast yn karharow tynn
Mes ugens mil a Gernowyon
Godhvos an ken a vynn.

‘Verow Trelawny bras?
‘Verow Trelawny bras?
Ottomma ugens mil Gernow
A wodhvydh oll an kas!

== Notes ==
- The original words were written about Sir John Trelawny (grandfather of the Bishop) who was leader of the King's party in Cornwall and on 13 May 1627 was committed to the Tower by the House of Commons for certain "offences against the liberty of free election" and "contempt of the House".
- "Michael's hold" may refer to Archangel Michael, commander of the legions of Heaven. Other sources say the line refers to a hold on St Michaels Mount (i.e. a prison or cell).
- There is some doubt as to whether the work was entirely original or an adaptation of an earlier tune.
- "Trelawny" is often referred to, by anyone who is Cornish, as the "unofficial" Cornish anthem and the most popular which is heard at Cornish rugby union matches and other Cornish gatherings, but the Cornish anthem that has been used by Gorsedh Kernow for the last 75 plus years is "Bro Goth Agan Tasow" ("The Land of My Fathers", or, literally, "Old Country of our Fathers") with a similar tune to the Welsh national anthem ("Hen Wlad Fy Nhadau") and the Breton national anthem. "Bro Goth Agan Tasow" is not heard so often, as it is sung in Cornish). Those who prefer an anthem in English often use "Hail to the Homeland".

== See also ==
- List of topics related to Cornwall
