= Rugby in Cornwall =

Rugby in Cornwall may refer to:

- Rugby union in Cornwall
- Rugby league in Cornwall
