= Troyl =

Cornish word relating to social event for dancing

Troyl is a colloquial Cornish word meaning a barn dance or céilidh, a social evening of dance, music and song.

== Etymology ==
Edward Lluyd (1660?–1709) knew the Cornish verb troillia - to twist, twirl, whirl, spin round. Edward Veale of Pentire, Newquay used the noun troil in the 1880s to describe a Cornish céilidh in Newquay. Robert Morton Nance collected the noun troyl in the 1920s. He classified the word as a 'Cornish dialect survival', and knew the similar Welsh noun which has the same Brittonic root. "Troyll" appeared in Robert Morton Nance's 1938 Cornish English dictionary with the meanings - circuit, spiral, spin, turn and lathe. Since the Cornish Dance Revival of the 1980s the noun Troyl has been consistently used to denote a Cornish céilidh.

== 19th century troyls ==
Speaking of social life associated with the fish cellars in Newquay in the late 19th century, Edward Veale related that "A dance or 'troil' ... always terminated the pilchard season. This was a feast for those connected with the cellars, each cellar having its own troil. After the feast, which was given in the loft, games and dancing followed. These were kept up until the small hours of the morning, the music being provided by a fiddler." Such Troils were also noted by Sarah Teague Husband and Edgar Rees, writing of 19th century Newquay. Veale also remembered seeing the step dance, Lattapuch, in the Unity Fish Cellars, Newquay, in the 1880s, and dancing the Lancers. It seems clear that social dancing, step dancing - sometimes competitive, music and song were involved. Such events occurred on the completion of a particularly successful catch and at the end of the pilchard season.

== Troyls of the Cornish Dance Revival ==
Since 1980, Troyls have been staged with increasing frequency due to the collection of a core repertoire of dances by Merv and Alison Davey, and the writing of numbers of modern folk dances in Cornish style by enthusiasts from several Cornish dance groups. The core repertoire has now been published in a book/tape/videotape package, and other DVDs and books are progressively becoming available.

A typical Troyl has a mixture of social (public dances), usually "called" to assist the less experienced. Most will be set dances, but as karoles were once found in Cornwall, and processional dances (furrys) survive to this day, so various rondes and farandoles are also danced. Between such items there will often be demonstration dances, music, songs, step-dancing or storytelling (droll telling).

== See also ==
- Cèilidh
- Culture of Cornwall
- Twmpath, a similar Welsh gathering
- Nos Lowen
- Fest Noz
