= Little Eyes =

Folksong originating in America

Little Eyes or Little Lize (Lil' Lize) is a folk song that is popular in Cornwall, England, UK, although it originated in America. There is a claim that it was written by Buford Abner of the Swannee River Boys in the late 1940s or early 1950s however the lyrics are found in the notated version of minstrel shows dating from the 1890s suggesting that it was from a preexisting folk song. The first known recording is from the 1950s by an American harmony group called the Delta Rhythm Boys.

Cornish miners working in America brought the song back to Cornwall and it was later taken up by a group from Camborne called the Joy Boys in 1955. After a few alterations it became a local hit and is still sung widely across Cornwall, but is rarely heard elsewhere. The song was adopted into the Cornish “shout” singing tradition and variation versions have been collected showing local variations. A variation of the lyrics include a version in the Cornish Language from an original translation by Ken George, demonstrating the significance of the song in its adopted community.

The Cornish band Crowns cover the song on their 2012 album Stitches in the Flag. Before the Crowns, several Cornish singers and groups had already recorded their own versions of the song including the internationally known folk-singer Brenda Wootton (1928–1994) who was considered an ambassador for the Cornish tradition. More recently the song was released by Fisherman's Friends of Port Isaac for their 2019 album, Keep Hauling which featured songs from the movie of the same name; this version has amassed hundreds of thousands of online plays.
