= Camborne Town Band =

- Brass Band
- Former name: Camborne (Holman CompAir), Camborne Independent, S.W.E.B. Camborne Town
- Founded: 1896 (129 years ago)
- Location: Camborne, Cornwall, England
- Music director: Gareth Churcher
- Website: camborneband.com

Camborne Town Band has a contest record from the late 19th century until the present day. It has been a local Championship band since its formation and on the National stage since the 1920s. Having won the National Second Section Championship in 1945 it was promoted to the Championship Section the following year-–a position it has retained ever since, having been placed in the top six in the country on six occasions. In 2006 it again qualified to represent the South-West at the National Finals–-the fifth time in six years.

Its success at the West of England Bandsmen's Festival (Bugle Contest) since the first contest, in 1912, is remarkable. Perhaps the unique atmosphere of the event inspires the band; certainly the sound of "The Cossack" on the upward march is very evocative. The band has brought the Royal Trophy back to Camborne on thirty-six occasions.

The band has performed on BBC Radio, BBC Television, at entertainment contests as well as local, regional and national contests as well as events including the 1,000 Cornish Male Voice extravaganza in 1983; the Rotary Conference concert in Bournemouth; the European tours of France and Holland; and the Goff Richards celebration concert at the Hall for Cornwall in 2004.
