= Full Swing (EP) =

2012 extended play by Crowns

EP by Crowns
- Released: 5 March 2012
- Genres: Folk Punk, Celtic Punk
- Length: 17:44
- Label: Ship Wreckords
- Producer: Tim Goalen

Crowns chronology
Full Swing (2012)	Stitches in the Flag (2012)

Professional ratings
Review scores
Source	Rating
Bring the Noise	6/10 stars

Full Swing is the debut EP from English Folk Punk band Crowns. A six-track EP recorded and released 2012.

"Kissing Gates" was the first single released from the EP in November 2011, followed by Full Swing in February 2012.

== Track listing ==
All music is composed by Crowns.

No.	Title	Length
1.	"Full Swing"	2:57
2.	"Kissing Gates"	2:58
3.	"Whose Pint's Whose?"	2:27
4.	"Hell Or High Water"	2:31
5.	"Bodmin Town"	3:17
6.	"She Swears Like A Sailor"	3:36
Total length:		17:44

== Personnel ==
Crowns

- Bill Jefferson - vocals/guitar
- Jake Butler - bass/backing vocals
- Jack Speckleton - mandolin/backing vocals
- Nathan Haynes - drums/backing vocals
