= The White Rose (song) =

Cornish folk song

Song
- Genre: Cornish folk

The White Rose is a traditional Cornish folk song, the chorus of which appeared in the film Ladies in Lavender (2005). The song remains popular and has been recorded by many of the Cornish male voice choirs and is often performed at funerals. In 2001 it was read at the funeral of Rick Rescorla, Cornish hero of 9/11.

== Lyrics ==
The White Rose

The first time I met you, my darling
Your face was as fair as the rose,
But now your dear face has grown paler
As pale as the lily white rose.

Chorus

I love the White Rose in its splendour
I love the White Rose in its bloom
I love the White Rose so fair as she grows.
It’s the rose that reminds me of you.

You're fair as the spring, oh my darling
Your face shines so bright, so divine
The fairest of blooms in my garden
Oh lily white rose, you are mine

Chorus

Years pass by so quickly, my darling,
Each makes you more precious to me;
But long may we grow close together,
Oh, lily-white rose, cling to me.

Chorus

Now I am alone, my sweet darling,
I walk through the garden and weep,
But spring will return with your presence
Oh lily white rose, mine to keep

Chorus

Alternate fourth verse

And now that you've left me my darling
From your grave one single flower grows
I will always remember you darling
When I gaze on that lily white rose.
