= Hail to the Homeland =

Cornish patriotic song

Hail to the Homeland is one of the unofficial anthems of Cornwall, in the south west of the UK. It was composed by the Cornish musician Kenneth Pelmear who composed and arranged many works for church and male voice choirs and brass bands. The words were written by Pearce Gilbert in 1959.

Other Cornish 'anthems' are Trelawny and Bro Goth Agan Tasow.

== Hail to the Homeland ==
Hail to the Homeland,
Great bastion of the free,
Hear now thy children
Proclaim their love for thee.
Ageless thy splendour,
Undimmed the Celtic flame.
Proudly our souls reflect
The glory of thy name.

Sense now the beauty,
The peace of Bodmin Moor,
Ride with the breaker
Towards the Sennen shore.
Let firm hands fondle
The boulders of Trencrom,
Sing with all fervour, then
The great Trelawny song.

Hail to the Homeland,
Of Thee we are a part.
Great pulse of freedom
In every Cornish heart,
Prompt us and guide us,
Endow us with thy power,
Lace us with liberty
To face this changing hour.

== See also ==
- List of topics related to Cornwall
- Culture of Cornwall
- Gorseth Kernow
