= Fest noz =

Breton traditional festival

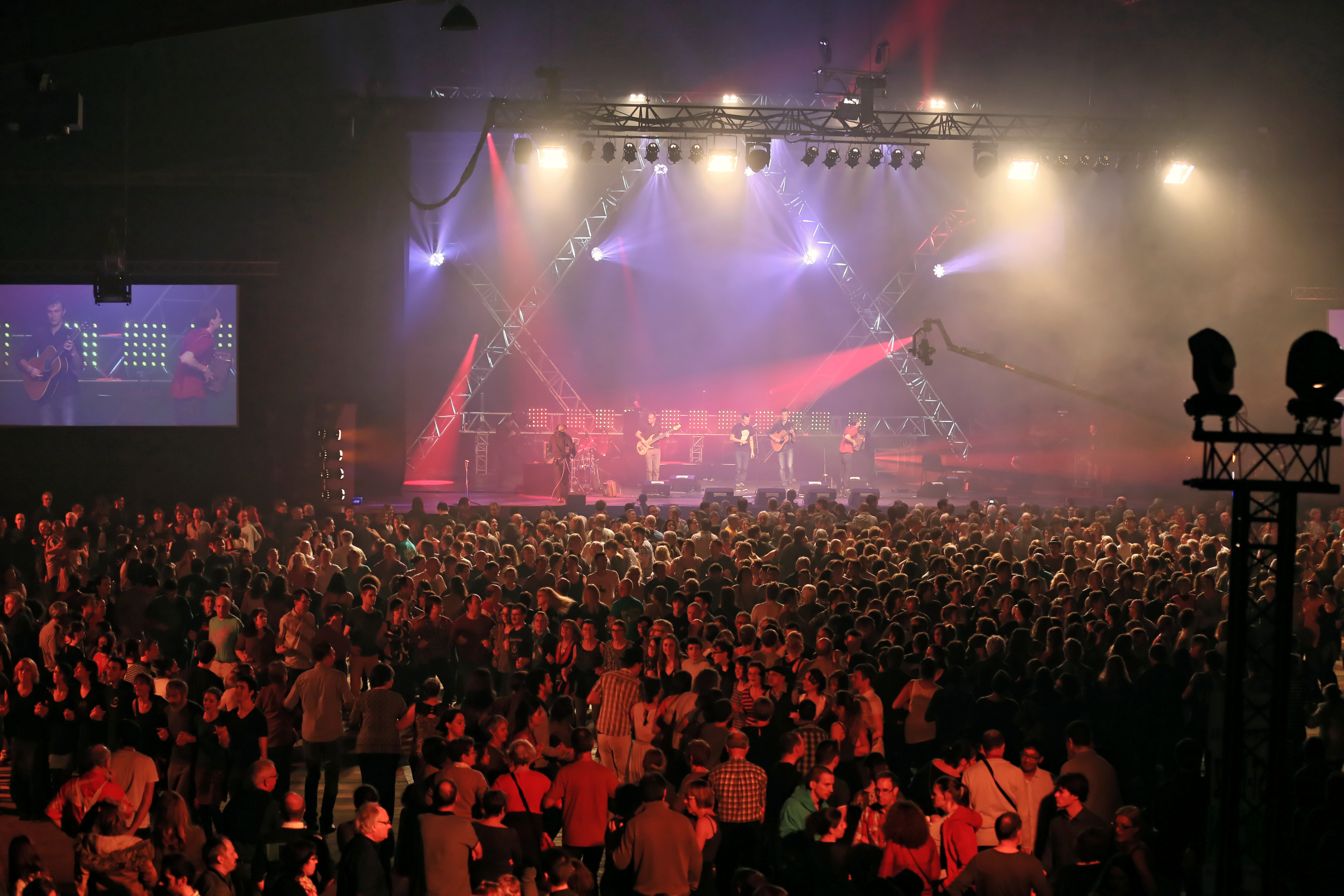
7,000 dancers in Rennes for the Fest Noz Yaouank 2015 (Startijenn on stage)

A fest noz (sometimes hyphenated as fest-noz; "night festival" in Breton) is a Breton traditional festival, with dancing in groups and live musicians playing acoustic instruments.

Although easy to write off the fest nozou and fêtes folkloriques as modern inventions, most of the traditional dances of the fest noz are ancient, some dating back to the Middle Ages, providing a way for the community to grasp hold of its past and relish a deep sense of being with ancestors and with place.

The plural in Breton is festoù noz, but the Goadec Sisters (a family of traditional singers) used to say festnozoù, and the French may also say in French des fest-noz.

On 5 December 2012 the fest noz was added by UNESCO to the Representative List of the Intangible Cultural Heritage of Humanity.

== Fest noz ==
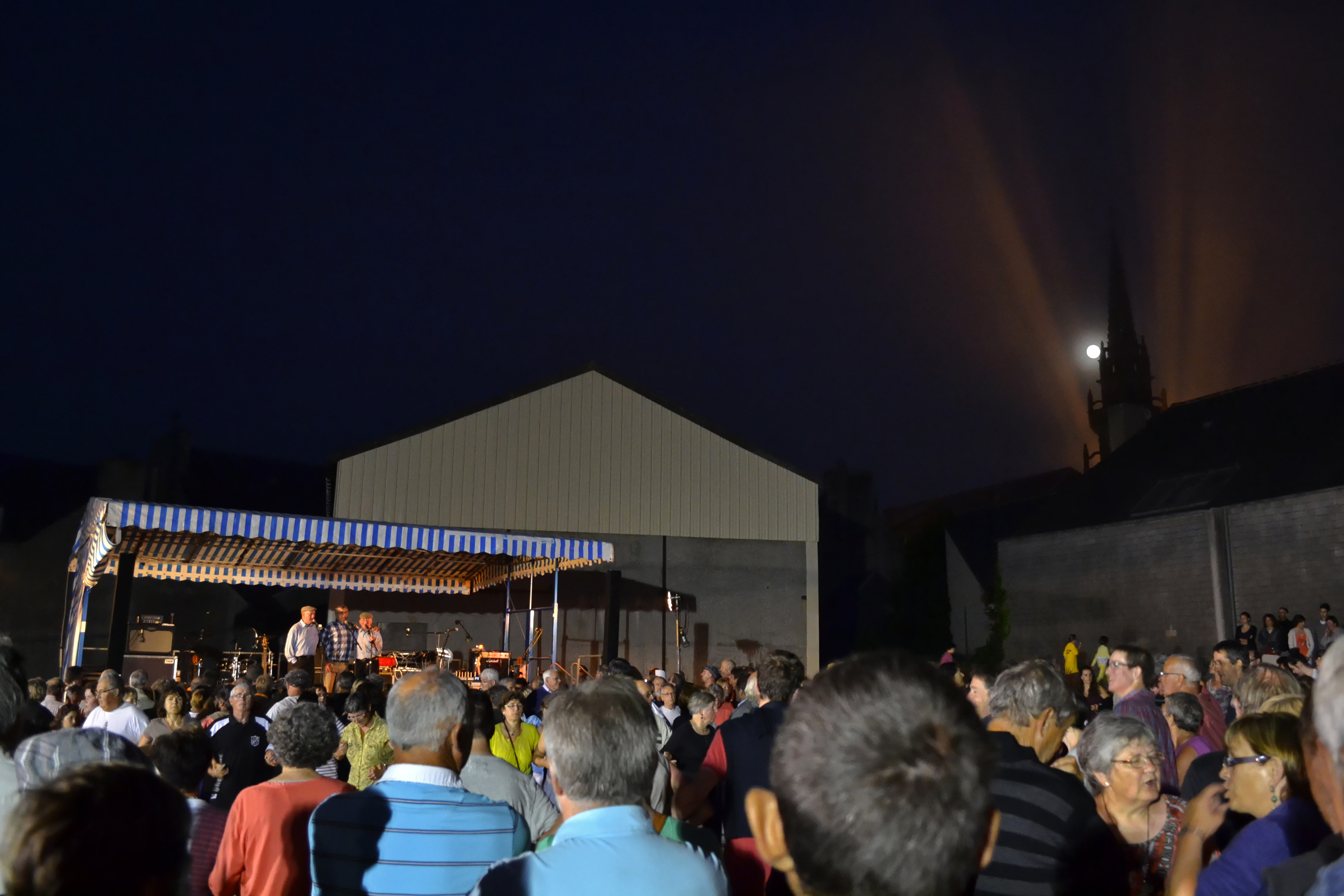
Frères Morvan, famous farmers brothers, in 2013

A fest noz (pl.: festoù noz) is a traditional dance festival in Brittany. Most Breton dances are social dances in a group. Currently, many festoù noz are also held outside Brittany within diaspora, bringing the Breton culture to life outside Breton territory. This term is known since the end of the 19th century but is given as a name only since the 1950s.

In the past, the dances were sometimes used to trample the ground to make a firm earth floor in a house or a solid surface for farm work (the "aire neuve" dances), to which people from the neighbourhood were invited, which explains the presence of stamping movements in some of the dances. For a long time the church banned "kof-ha-kof" (stomach-to-stomach) dances, meaning dancing in pairs. These festivals were a chance for young people to meet and size each other up, on a social level, by their clothes, and to see how quickly they got tired, since dances sometimes continued for a long time and involved complex and swift steps that required effort and skill.

These days, festoù noz are still very popular, mixing the different generations. Most of the villages have a fest noz at least once a year, organised by the sports clubs, the school, etc. It is a way to express their culture and identity, and to share common values with friends of a night. As in many group folk dances, one talks of sometimes reaching a trance state because of repetitive music, and physical exertion. During the summer and tourist season, in many ways, taking part in a fest noz is for many people like an alternative way of going to a night club.

== The dances ==
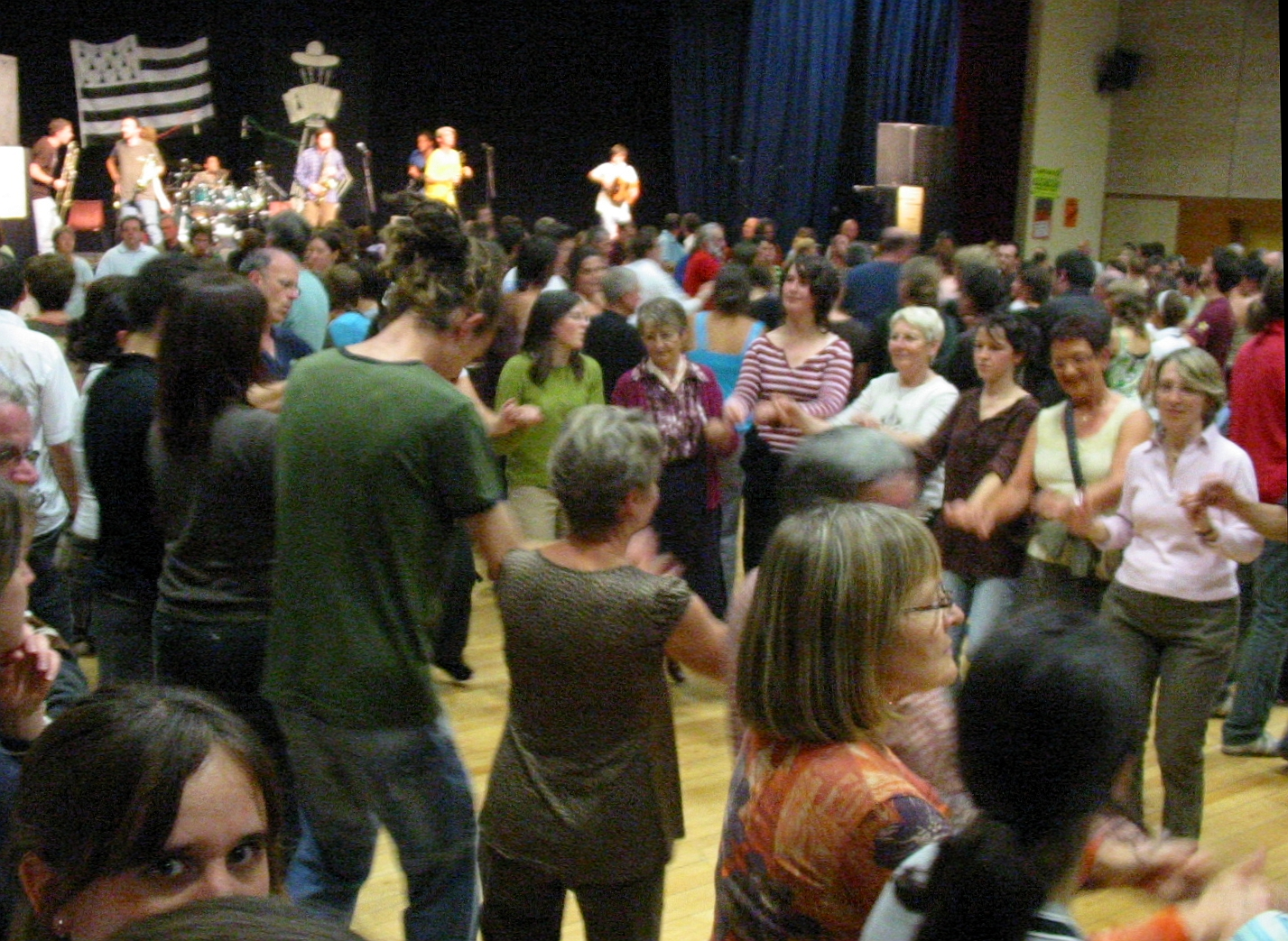
A fest noz in the Pays Gallo in 2007 as part of the Mill Góll festival

There are hundreds of traditional dances, of which the most well-known are gavottes, an dro, 'hanter dro, plinn, and Scottish. During the fest noz, most dances are practised in a chain or in a circle (everyone holds hands), but there are also dances in pairs and "choreographed" dances, meaning dances enriched with precise artistic elements (sequences, figures, etc.).

The major study on Breton dancing is "La tradition populaire de danse en Basse-Bretagne", book written from his thesis dissertation, by Jean-Michel Guilcher (new edition by Coop-Breizh, Chasse-Marée/Armen, 1995).

== The music ==
There are principally two types of music at these festivals: music sung a cappella (kan ha diskan), accompanied with music or purely instrumental. Before the invention of microphones and amplified instruments, common instruments included the talabard (a sort of oboe or shawm) and the Breton bagpipes (binioù kozh), due to their high volume. Also popular was the diatonic accordion, the clarinet, and occasionally the violin and the hurdy-gurdy. After the Second World War, the Scottish bagpipes (binioù bras) also became common in Brittany thanks to bagadoù (pipe bands) and thus often replaced the binioù-kozh. The basic clarinet (treujenn-gaol, 'cabbage core' in Breton) had all but disappeared but has regained popularity over the past few years.

Other than the traditional instruments, there are nowadays groups with many different styles of music ranging from rock, jazz, to punk and also mixes with styles from other countries. String instruments (the violin, the double-bass, the acoustic guitar, the electric guitar, the bass guitar) and North African percussion instruments have long since been adopted. To varying degrees, some fest noz groups also use electronic keyboards and synthesisers (Strobinell, Sonerien Du, Les Baragouineurs, Plantec, etc.). Brass instruments are becoming increasingly commonplace, often bringing with them sounds approaching those of Oriental music.

== The programme ==
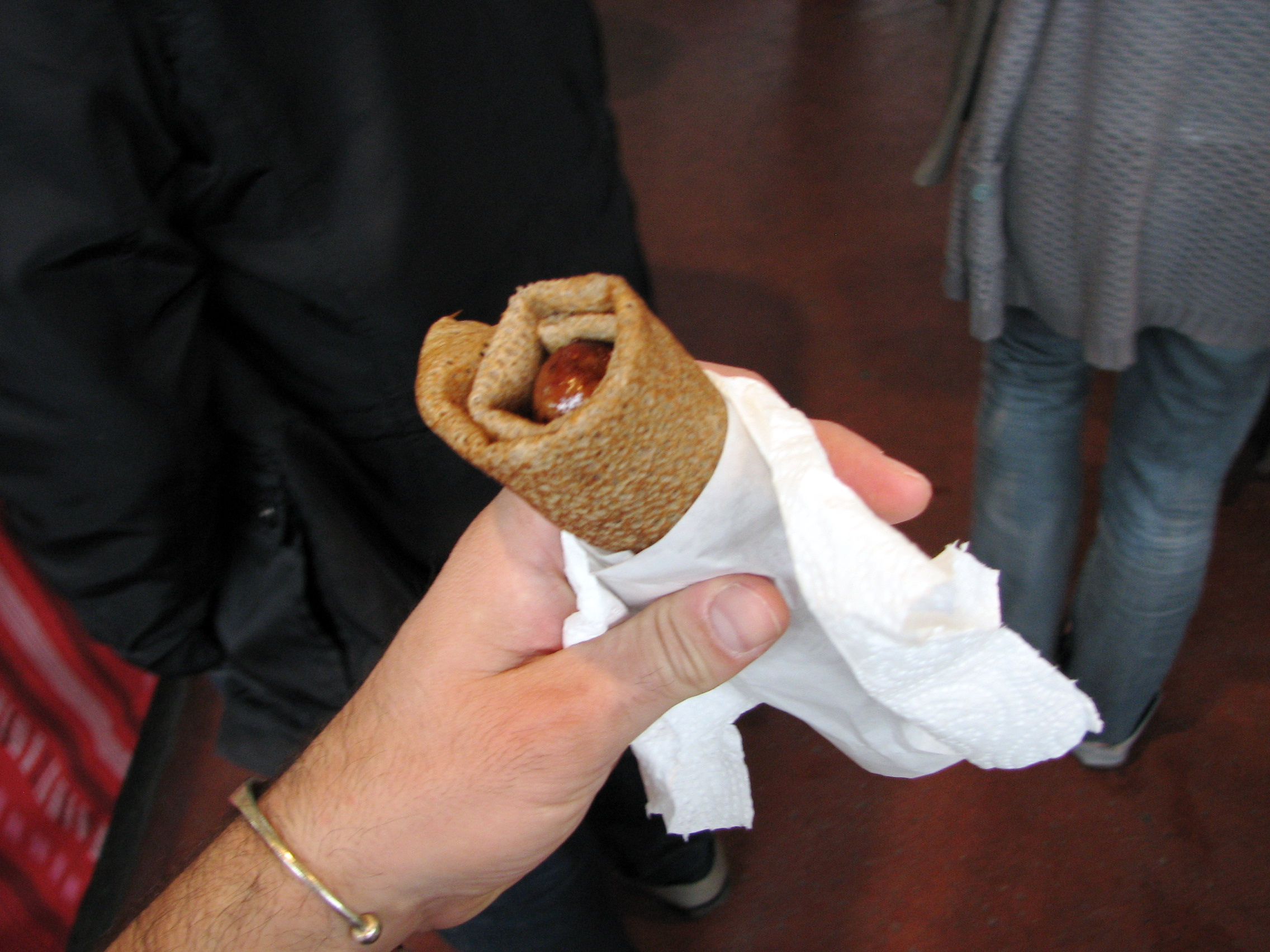
Galette-saucisse in Rennes

Just after the revival of the 1970s, the standard was to alternate a couple of singers (a cappella or kan a diskan) and a couple of musicians (biniou and talabard generally). It was common to see the holding of "free stages". Currently, couples of singers (kanerien) and couples of musicians (sonerien) play alternately with a band. Bands play more instrumental music and often the practice of the dance is different from the two other ways to conduct the dancers.

Between every "suite" (three dances), there are short breaks where dancers socialise by chatting to other dancers or visiting the traditional buffet of local dishes like crêpes, galettes-saucisses, far Breton, and kouign-amann, with local cider, beer, and chouchenn, a mead-like drink made from fermented honey.

== See also ==
- Balfolk
- Céilí dance
- Music of Brittany
- Nos lowen
- Noson llawen
- Troyl
- Faroese chain dance
