= Goff Richards =

Cornish brass band arranger and composer

Goff Richards (18 August 1944 – 25 June 2011), sometimes credited as Godfrey Richards, was a prominent Cornish brass band arranger and composer. He was born in Cornwall, studying at the Royal College of Music and Reading University. Between 1976 and 1989, he lectured in arranging and at Salford College of Technology. He was the musical director of the Chetham's Big Band for many years. In 1976, he was made a Bard of the Cornish Gorsedd. He received a Doctorate from Salford University in 1990, after a career that had seen him lead the University Jazz Orchestra to the BBC Big Band of the Year title in 1989.

He was well known for his original brass compositions such as "Trailblaze", "Doyen", "Exploding Brass!" and the marches "The Jaguar" and "Barnard Castle", and won a European Broadcasting Union Award in 1984 for his "Continental Caprice". He was also a prolific arranger for brass bands, and his works included "Hymns of Praise", "Shepherd's Song", "Over the Rainbow", "Mack the Knife", "New York, New York", "Chanson d'Amour", "I'll Walk with God", and "That's a Plenty". He also arranged and composed light orchestral and choral works, and his works have been performed by the King's Singers, Huddersfield Choral Society, London Brass, Evelyn Glennie and various BBC orchestras.

He is also credited to have written the solo piece Demelza (also known as The Maid of the Mist) under the pen name Hugh Nash, originally for E flat tenor horn then later for the soprano cornet.

He died on 25 June 2011 in Cheshire, following an illness, at the age of 66.
