= Cumpas Ltd =

UK charity

Cumpas Ltd. is a registered charity which promotes Cornish music and dance. It was founded in 1996 by Hilary Coleman and Frances Bennett. Its original name was Cornish Music Projects. Cumpas is a Cornish word meaning shipshape or proper job.

It promotes regular music events at Nancledra, Truro, Tywardreath and St Day. It supports music in education workshops and publishes teaching resources.
