= Twmpath =

Welsh word meaning a social gathering for dancing

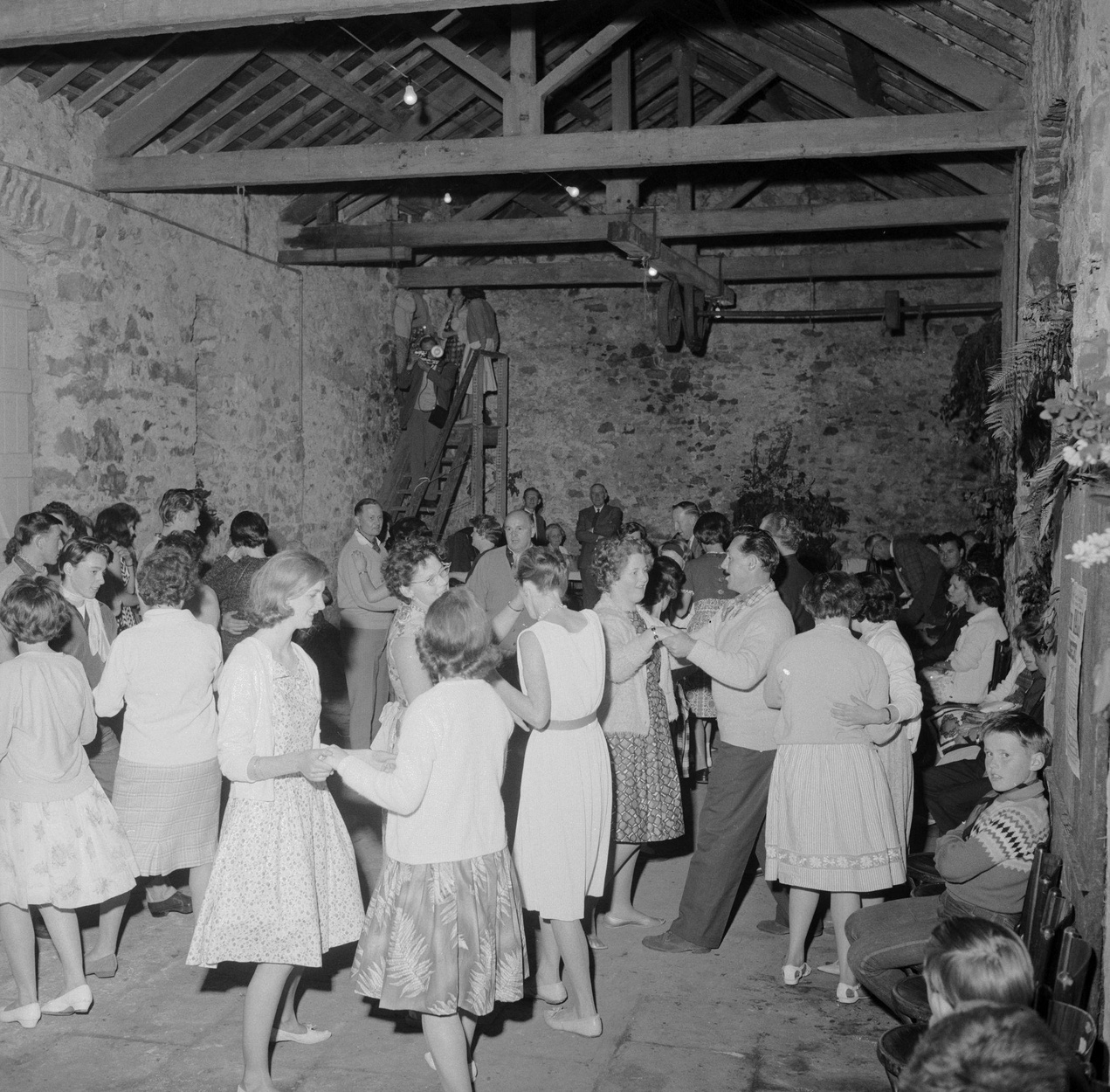
- A Twmpath dance held at a barn, Llangefni 1963
- Medium: Dance
- Originating culture: Welsh

Twmpath (Welsh pronunciation: [ˈtʊmpaθ]) is a Welsh word literally meaning a hump or tump, once applied to the mound or village green upon which the musicians sat and played for the community to dance.

Twmpath dawnsiau were a form of barn dance organised by Urdd Gobaith Cymru in the late 1950s and 1960s for the entertainment of young people, mainly from rural areas. These events remained popular until the rise of discos in the 1970s. Twmpath is used today to mean a Welsh version of the barn dance or cèilidh.

The same word is also used to refer to a speed bump.

== See also ==
- Culture of Wales
- Troyl
