= List of New Order tribute albums =

A number of bands have decided to pay tribute to New Order by recording tribute albums. A tribute album is a collection of covers from either one, or several artists, of music originally by another artist. There are several New Order tribute albums on the market.

All the material released by Peter Hook and the Light can be considered tribute albums, as that is essentially a covers band.

== Essence > Tribute To New Order ==
Essentially the first New Order tribute ever released. The album was released in Brazil in 1997, under 'The The Records'.

Track listing

1. Morgue - "Thieves Like Us"
2. Individual Industry - "Bizarre Love Triangle"
3. Biopsy - "Fine Time"
4. Clone DT - "Ceremony/Temptation"
5. Nude - "The Perfect Kiss"
6. Toward The Cathedral - "Regret"
7. Resonate - "Your Silent Face"
8. Um Ou Não - "We All Stand"
9. Oil Filter - "Confusion"
10. Aghast View - "True Faith"
11. Tétine - "Truth"
12. Etern - "Touched By The Hand Of God"
13. Harry - "Doubts Even Here"
14. Simbolo - "State Of The Nation"
15. Night Shift - "Vanishing Point"

== Blue Order - A Trance Tribute To New Order ==
Released in 1997 by Hypnotic, a division of Cleopatra Records.

Track listing

1. Intro
2. Martin N - "Confusion"
3. Flipside - "Blue Monday"
4. Coercion - "Touched By The Hand Of Dub"
5. Endorphin - "Spooky"
6. Martin O. - "Young Offender"
7. T.H.C. - "1963"
8. Bugeyed Funk - "Fine Time"
9. Sandowski - "Everything's Gone Green"
10. Flipside - "The Beach"
11. Judson Leach - "Bizarre Love Triangle"
12. Casey Stratton - "Regret"

== Thieves Like Us: New Order Tribute ==
Released in 2000 by Si Records. Track #8 is mislabeled as Mesh on the CD release, probably to mimic the same mistake on the New Order compilation Substance.

Track listing

1. Thursday 29 - "Age Of Consent"
2. Echo Stylus - "Ruined In A Day"
3. Strange Angels - "Touched By The Hand Of God"
4. Satellite Circle - "True Faith"
5. Sensoria - "Hurt"
6. MinGys - "Dream Attack"
7. Fadestation - "In A Lonely Place"
8. Florentine Cruise - "Cries & Whispers"
9. Suzuki Kid - "Confusion"
10. Vegasphere - "Round & Round"
11. Radiate - "Regret"
12. International Jewel Thieves - "World In Motion"
13. Neutered Faith - "Angel Dust"
14. Larry Petrov Jr. - "Times Change"

== Re:Movement – Tribute To New Order ==
Released in Japan in 2001 by Electric Sal.

Track listing

1. Color Filter - "Regret"
2. Rithium+3 - "Your Silent Face"
3. Daffodil-19 - "Leave Me Alone"
4. The Primrose - "True Faith"
5. Peltone - "Blue Monday"
6. Hideki Yoshimura - "Love Vigilantes"
7. Nyeed - "Thieves Like Us"
8. Capsule Giants! - "The Perfect Kiss"
9. Salt Lake - "Ceremony"
10. Sugiurumn - "World In Motion"

== A Tribute To New Order (2001) ==
Released in 2001 by Cleopatra Records. Note that track #3 is identical to Martin N's Confusion from Blue Order; the name of the artist simply changed over the years. Same case with track #5 by DJ Buzz; the track Young Offender is simply an edit of the Martin O. track on Blue Order. Another interesting fact, DJ Pebbles' rendition of Blue Monday is actually a cover of the Hardfloor Remix of New Order's Blue Monday.

Track listing

1. Razed In Black - "Everything's Gone Green"
2. DJ Pebbles - "Blue Monday"
3. DJ Martin - "Confusion"
4. DJ Matthew Grim - "Round & Round"
5. DJ Buzz - "Young Offender"
6. Judson Leach - "Bizarre Love Triangle"
7. Vitamin DDT - "World (The Price Of Love)"
8. Transmutator - "Temptation"
9. Baby Shaker - "Shellshock"
10. Interface - "True Faith"
11. DJ Fuzz - "Blue Monday"

== True Faith: A Tribute To New Order ==
Released in 2001 by Synthphony Records.

Track listing

1. Intact - "True Faith"
2. Days Of Fate - "Bizarre Love Triangle"
3. Seabound - "Confusion"
4. Shades Of Grey - "Thieves Like Us"
5. Atlantic Popes - "Ceremony"
6. Hungry Lucy - "Love Vigilantes"
7. Invisible Limits - "Temptation"
8. Wave in Head - "Blue Monday"
9. Paradoxx - "The Perfect Kiss"
10. Equatronic - "Every Little Counts"
11. Provision - "Vanishing Point"
12. D'Woolve - "Shellshock"
13. Persona - "Your Silent Face"
14. Dark Distant Spaces - "1963"

== The String Quartet Tribute To New Order & Joy Division ==
A tribute to both New Order, and the band it came from, Joy Division, by the Silo String Quartet, released in 2003 by Vitamin Records. Songs #1 to #4 are Joy Division songs, and #10 is an original composition.

Track listing

1. Love Will Tear Us Apart
2. She's Lost Control
3. Isolation
4. New Dawn Fades
5. Bizarre Love Triangle
6. Blue Monday
7. Love Vigilantes
8. True Faith
9. Regret
10. Waiting Here

== Community: A NewOrderOnline Tribute ==
Released by Retroforward Records. This tribute album was composed of covers by various members of the unofficial New Order website, www.neworderonline.com in 2004. Track #5, #8 & #13 are Joy Division tracks. Track #7 is an Electronic track (Electronic is a side-project band that New Order's lead singer Bernard Sumner had going on after 1993). Love Vigilantes by Known Pleasures is a hidden track; after Almanso's Angel Dust finishes, there is about seven minutes of silence until Known Pleasures' track starts.

Track listing

1. kREMLIN - "Sooner Than You Think"
2. Captain Black - "Procession"
3. Evaluna - "Thieves Like Us"
4. Labster - "Face Up"
5. Project Wintermute - "Transmission"
6. Unfaith - "True Faith"
7. Cloudless - "Some Distant Memory"
8. Slightly Narrow Sound System - "Heart & Soul"
9. C Bentley - "In A Lonely Place"
10. Dance Upon Nothing - "Bizarre Love Triangle"
11. International - "The Perfect Kiss"
12. Flight - "Dreams Never End"
13. Spiral Of Silence - "Dead Souls"
14. La Fin De Tout - "586"
15. The Minus One - "We All Stand"
16. Almanso - "Angel Dust"

16½. Known Pleasures - "Love Vigilantes"

== CommunityEP: A NewOrderOnline Tribute ==
Released in 2004 by Retroforward Records. This EP contained some tracks the producers feel should have made the CD, and a collaboration on the song Crystal by Almanso and the lead singer from The Minus One, called Nemesis (now they call themselves Glasnost). Track #6 is actually by Known Pleasures (who did Love Vigilantes on the preceding album), only again, there was a name-change in between.

Track listing

1. Almanso - "Ceremony"
2. Flight - "Dreams Never End"
3. C Bentley - "Temptation"
4. Manumatic - "Love Less"
5. Almanso - "Angle Dust (Project Wintermute Evil Dust Machine Remix)"
6. Digital - "Leave Me Alone"
7. Nemesis - "Crystal"

== Revolving World - A Tribute To New Order ==
Released in 2005 by Popswirl Records. Temptation is a hidden track, along the same lines as Love Vigilantes from Community.

Track listing

1. So Happy - "Blue Monday"
2. Magnolia - "1963"
3. Alight - "Guilty Partner"
4. Scalde - "Crystal"
5. Shed - "The Perfect Kiss"
6. Mango - "World (The Price Of Love)"
7. The Rams - "Shellshock"
8. Kii Noo - "Age Of Consent"
9. Feelings Of Nowhere - "Round & Round"
10. For The Chosen Few - "Your Silent Face"
11. Unwise - "Brutal"
12. Eventide - "Ceremony"
13. Airbag - "True Faith"
14. Laura Van Dam - "Turn My Way"
15. Une Vie Austère - "Lonesome Tonight"

15½. Anthony Stretch - "Temptation"

== Love's Shattered Pride: A Tribute To Joy Division & New Order ==
Released in 2005 by Failure To Communicate Records. Tracks #1 to #4 and #9 to #12 are Joy Division tracks.

Track listing

1. Extropy - "Heart & Soul"
2. Audra - "Walked In Line"
3. In The Nursery - "Love Will Tear Us Apart"
4. The Brides - "The Drawback"
5. Unto Ashes - "The Him"
6. Jupiter Blue - "Regret"
7. Sheriff Scabs - "Love Vigilantes"
8. Ahab Rex & The Fourteens - "Crystal"
9. Neologos - "Twenty Four Hours"
10. Nerve Exhibit - "New Dawn Fades"
11. Hearts Fail - "Decades"
12. Theatre Of The Absurd - "Ice Age"
13. Kolar - "Ceremony"
14. BlackCycle - "Blue Monday"

== Community 2: A NewOrderOnline Tribute ==
An enhanced tribute CD released in late 2006 by Retroforward Records as a follow-up to Community: A NewOrderOnline Tribute. There also included is a video for The Village by David Potts. Tracks #11 and #12 are Joy Division tracks. Sunrise Before Dawn is Alight (featured on Revolving World) lead singer Tracey DiLascio's solo project. Flash background music provided by Razed In A New Division Of Agony (Logan Edwards).

Track listing

1. David Potts - "The Village"
2. Tin God - "Your Silent Face"
3. Yokohama Crepuscule - "Run"
4. C Bentley - "ICB"
5. Sunrise Before Dawn - "Ruined In A Day"
6. 3V - "Blue Monday"
7. Phantom West - "Doubts Even Here"
8. Labster - "Behind Closed Doors"
9. Glasnost - "Turn"
10. Popvert - "Subculture"
11. Serotonin - "No Love Lost"
12. Almanso - "New Dawn Fades"
13. Tomihira - "Mr. Disco"
14. kREMLIN - "Lonesome Tonight"
15. Generalized - "1963"
16. O'ou - "Dream Attack"
17. David Potts - "The Village (DJ Ionic Remix)"

== Ceremony - A New Order Tribute ==
A collection of New Order covers by various independent acts from North America and Europe, compiled into a Double CD Digi-pack and two additional albums: One of songs that could not fit onto the physical package and another composed completely of "Ceremony" covers.

Released on February 20, 2010 by 24 Hour Service Station.

Double CD (Physical)

Track listing
Disc One

1. Peter Hook - "Strangely Enough Impact" (Spoken Word Dedication to Tony Wilson)
2. Yes But No - "Ceremony"
3. Kites With Lights - "Dream Attack"
4. Rabbit In The Moon - "Blue Monday"
5. The Dark Romantics - "Crystal"
6. Pocket (musician) (feat. Shaun Robinson & Tracy Shedd - "Sub-Culture"
7. Solo Gigolos UK - "World"
8. LoneWolf (feat. Geri X) - "Turn"
9. Detachments - "Mr Disco"
10. The Beauvilles - "Paradise"
11. Christian Webb & Adam Knowles - "Run"
12. Sunbears! - "Thieves Like Us"
13. GD Luxxe - "60 Miles An Hour"
14. Jimmy Oakes - "Love Vigilantes"
15. John Ralston (musician) - "All Day Long"
16. The Dark Esquire - "Temptation"
17. Johnny Parry - "The Him"

Disc Two

1. The Bedford Incident - "As It Is When It Was"
2. Sibling - "Round & Round"
3. Detachments - "The Perfect Kiss"
4. Flight - "Your Silent Face"
5. Kingsbury (band) - "This Time Of Night"
6. The Cloud Room - "Blue Monday"
7. The Sheaks - "Ceremony"
8. History - "Sunrise"
9. Light Yourself On Fire - "Chosen Time"
10. Allegra Gellar - "Leave Me Alone"
11. XOXO - "Every Little Counts"
12. Jimmy Oakes - "Bizarre Love Triangle"
13. Win Win Winter - "Regret"
14. The Milling Gowns - "1963"
15. Yes But No (Kites With Lights Remix) - "Ceremony"

(Digital only at first, released in physical form later)
Digital Album
Track listing

1. Marc Deon - "Mr Disco"
2. Manumatic - "Chosen Time"
3. CBentley - "Everything's Gone Green"
4. Lush Progress - "Waiting For The Sirens' Call"
5. Jimmy Oakes - "Love Less"
6. The Artificial Sea - "We All Stand"
7. Flight - "Truth"
8. Fornever - "Angel Dust"
9. Wedgepiece - "Your Silent Face"
10. Last Year's Model - "Face Up"
11. Razed In A New Division Of Agony - "Doubts Even Here"
12. TurboVamps - "Love Vigilantes"
13. The Thin Boys - "Procession"
14. The Sheaks - "Run"
15. Against The Stars - "True Faith"
16. Marc Deon - "Confusion"

Ceremony 12 Versions
Track listing

1. Christian Webb & Adam Knowles - "Ceremony"
2. Yes But No (Kites With Lights Remix) - "Ceremony"
3. The Bedford Incident - "Ceremony"
4. Razed In A New Division Of Agony - "Ceremony"
5. Fornever - "Ceremony"
6. Glomag - "Ceremony"
7. The Milling Gowns - "Ceremony"
8. The Sheaks - "Ceremony"
9. Yes But No - "Ceremony"
10. Kingsbury - "Ceremony"
11. Marc Deon - "Ceremony"
12. Last Year's Model - "Ceremony"

== Power, Corruption & Lies Covered ==
A tribute album to the album of the same name, included in the February 2012 issue of MOJO Magazine.

Track listing

1. The Golden Filter - "Age Of Consent"
2. Errors -"The Village"
3. S.C.U.M. - "586"
4. Fujiya & Miyagi - "Your Silent Face"
5. Seekae - "Ultraviolence"
6. Walls - "Ecstasy"
7. Destroyer - "Leave Me Alone"
8. Biosphere - "Blue Monday"
9. Zombie Zombie - "The Beach"
10. Lonelady - "Cries & Whispers"
11. Another Blood - "Lonesome Tonight"
12. K-X-P - "Murder"

== A Tribute to New Order (2024) ==
A digital tribute album to the band, released in 2024 by the band Artificial Order. Despite being digital only, it is listed as a 'double disc' album. This album is exclusively on YouTube.

Track listing 'Disc 1'

1. Shellshock
2. Brutal
3. Everything's Gone Green
4. Be A Rebel
5. Fine Time
6. Regret
7. State Of The Nation
8. I Told You So
9. Special
10. Doubts Even Here
11. Touched By The Hand Of God
12. In A Lonely Place
13. Player In The League
14. This Time Of Night
15. Cries & Whispers
16. Academic
17. Chosen Time
18. Spooky
19. Bizarre Love Triangle
20. Ultraviolence
21. Temptation
22. Crystal

Track listing 'Disc 2'

1. The Perfect Kiss
2. Here To Stay
3. Round & Round
4. Thieves Like Us
5. All Day Long
6. True Faith
7. World (The Price Of Love)
8. Someone Like You
9. Your Silent Face
10. Mesh
11. Vanishing Point
12. Too Late
13. Sunrise
14. I'll Stay With You
15. Dream Attack
16. Ruined In A Day
17. Waiting For The Sirens' Call
18. Slow Jam
19. Angel Dust
20. Sabotage
21. Ceremony
