= On Cassette =

American indie rock band

- Origin: Orlando, FL, United States
- Genres: Indie Rock
- Years active: 2004-2006
- Label: Post Records
- Past members: Matt Butcher; Chris Rae; James Valent
- Website: http://myspace.com/oncassette

On Cassette were an indie rock band formed in Orlando, FL in 2004. They released a self-titled 7" on Post Records, and later self-released a posthumous "Thanks EP" containing the first 7" as well as an unreleased EP and demos. The band later disbanded in 2006.

== Post Breakup ==
After disbanding in 2006, Matt Butcher and Chris Rae continued with The Heathens until 2007. Matt Butcher then followed with The Revolvers which later fused into his own solo career. To date, he has released two critically acclaimed solo albums.

Chris Rae later went on to play bass in Mumpsy until 2010. He currently lives in Colorado with his wife.

James Valent records electronic music under the moniker Careless Whisper. He lives in Seattle, WA with his wife.

== Discography ==
- s/t 7" (2005)
- On Cassette is Dead (2004-2006) (2024)
