= Ceremony – A New Order Tribute =

Studio album by various artists
- Released: 20 February 2010
- Recorded: USA, Europe (2009)
- Genre: New wave, alternative rock, electronica
- Length: 144:27
- Label: 24 Hour Service Station
- Producer: Sonshine Ward, Marshall Dickson

Ceremony – A New Order Tribute is a collection of New Order covers by independent acts from the United States and Europe, compiled into a double CD Digi-pack and two additional digital albums. Produced by Sonshine Ward and Marshall Dickson, it was released in February 2010 by 24 Hour Service Station, with contributions from artists such as Peter Hook (one of the original members of both New Order and its original incarnation, Joy Division), Kites With Lights, and Rabbit in the Moon. The album is dedicated to the founder of Factory Records, Tony Wilson, and it benefits the Salford Foundation Trust's Tony Wilson Award.

== Background ==
The album consists of cover songs of the band New Order, an English musical group formed in 1980 by Bernard Sumner (vocals, guitars, synthesizers), Peter Hook (bass, backing vocals, electronic drums) and Stephen Morris (drums, synthesizers). New Order were formed in the wake of the demise of their previous group Joy Division, following the suicide of vocalist Ian Curtis. They were soon joined by additional keyboardist Gillian Gilbert. New Order combined post-punk and electronic dance, and became one of the most critically acclaimed bands of the 1980s. They were first recorded by Tony Wilson, founder of Factory Records.

== Production ==
Ceremony – A New Order Tribute is a tribute album released by 24 Hour Service Station in Tampa, Florida. It features covers by various independent acts from the United States and Europe, compiled into a Double CD Digi-pack and two additional digital albums. Produced by Sonshine Ward, it was released in February 2010 by 24 Hour Service Station.

The album is dedicated to the founder of Factory Records, Tony Wilson, who died in 2007 from cancer. Marshall Dickson was originally inspired by Wilson to start 24 Hour Service Station.

The album benefits the Salford Foundation Trust's Tony Wilson Award. Artists donated time and recordings to support the charity, which "assists young people who demonstrate a special talent or ambition in the arts or creative skills."

== Reception ==
Professional ratings
Review scores
| Source | Rating |
|---|---|
| AllMusic | link |

AllMusic reviewer William Ruhlmann gave the album 3.5/5 stars, and praised in particular the tracks that strayed from the original New Order compositions. He wrote, "Ceremony: A New Order Tribute is not the first album to pay tribute to the British techno-dance band New Order. But this one is more ambitious, spreading across two CDs, and it can claim at least partial authorization from the group."

== Track listing ==
=== Double CD (Physical) ===
Disc One
| No. | Title | Artist | Length |
|---|---|---|---|
| 1. | "Strangely Enough Impact" (Spoken Word Dedication to Tony Wilson) | Peter Hook | 2:28 |
| 2. | "Ceremony" | Yes But No | 4:38 |
| 3. | "Dream Attack" | Kites With Lights | 4:52 |
| 4. | "Blue Monday" | Rabbit in the Moon | 7:56 |
| 5. | "Crystal" | The Dark Romantics | 4:08 |
| 6. | "Sub-Culture" | Pocket | 4:48 |
| 7. | "World" | Solo Gigolos UK | 3:23 |
| 8. | "Turn" (feat. Geri X) | LoneWolf | 3:38 |
| 9. | "Mr Disco" | Detachments | 3:02 |
| 10. | "Paradise" | The Beauvilles | 3:57 |
| 11. | "Run" | Christian Webb & Adam Knowles | 4:41 |
| 12. | "Thieves Like Us" | Sunbears! | 5:51 |
| 13. | "60 Miles An Hour" | GD Luxxe | 4:58 |
| 14. | "Love Vigilantes" | Jimmy Oakes | 4:03 |
| 15. | "All Day Long" | John Ralston | 3:56 |
| 16. | "Temptation" | The Dark Esquire | 4:50 |
| 17. | "The Him" | Johnny Parry | 3:06 |

Disc Two
| No. | Title | Artist | Length |
|---|---|---|---|
| 1. | "As It Is When It Was" (Kites With Lights Remix) | The Bedford Incident | 4:04 |
| 2. | "Round & Round" | SIBLING | 3:40 |
| 3. | "The Perfect Kiss" | Detachments | 9:33 |
| 4. | "Your Silent Face" | Flight | 4:51 |
| 5. | "This Time of Night" | Kingsbury | 4:45 |
| 6. | "Blue Monday" | The Cloud Room | 3:49 |
| 7. | "Ceremony" | The Sheaks | 4:59 |
| 8. | "Sunrise" | History | 5:21 |
| 9. | "Chosen Time" | Light Yourself on Fire | 3:08 |
| 10. | "Leave Me Alone" | Allegra Gellar | 4:30 |
| 11. | "Every Little Counts" | Xoxo | 4:00 |
| 12. | "Bizarre Love Triangle" | Jimmy Oakes | 2:57 |
| 13. | "Regret" | Win Win Winter | 3:39 |
| 14. | "1963" | The Milling Gowns | 5:27 |
| 15. | "Ceremony" | Yes But No | 4:31 |
| Total length: | | | ? |

=== The Digital Album ===
(Originally digital release, now physical)
| No. | Title | Artist | Length |
|---|---|---|---|
| 1. | "Mr. Disco" | Marc Deon | 3:03 |
| 2. | "Chosen Time" | Manumatic | 4:33 |
| 3. | "Everything's Gone Green" | Cbentley | 5:51 |
| 4. | "Waiting For the Sirens' Call" | Lush Progress | 5:37 |
| 5. | "Love Less" | Jimmy Oakes | 2:17 |
| 6. | "We All Stand" | The Artificial Sea | 5:38 |
| 7. | "Truth" | Flight | 4:29 |
| 8. | "Angel Dust" | Fornever | 3:28 |
| 9. | "Your Silent Face" | Wedgepiece | 5:09 |
| 10. | "Face Up" | Last Years Model / This Year's Model | 4:15 |
| 11. | "Doubts Even Here" | Razed in a New Division of Agony | 4:34 |
| 12. | "Love Bigilantes" | Turbovamps | 2:16 |
| 13. | "Procession" | The Thin Boys | 4:44 |
| 14. | "Run" | Against the Stars | 5:11 |
| 15. | "True Faith" | Against the Stars | 4:39 |
| 16. | "Confusion" | Marc Deon | 3:28 |
| Total length: | | | 1:09:12 |

=== Twelve Versions of Ceremony ===
(Originally digital release, now physical)
| No. | Title | Artist | Length |
|---|---|---|---|
| 1. | "Ceremony" | Adam Knowles / Christian Webb | 4:18 |
| 2. | "Ceremony" | Yes But No | 4:32 |
| 3. | "Ceremony" | The Bedford Incident | 4:17 |
| 4. | "Ceremony" | Razed in a New Division of Agony | 5:34 |
| 5. | "Ceremony" | Fornever | 3:05 |
| 6. | "Ceremony" | Glomag | 4:37 |
| 7. | "Ceremony" | The Milling Gowns | 5:57 |
| 8. | "Ceremony" | The Sheaks | 5:00 |
| 9. | "Ceremony" | Yes But No | 4:38 |
| 10. | "Ceremony" | Kingsbury | 4:50 |
| 11. | "Ceremony" | Marc Deon | 4:46 |
| 12. | "Ceremony" | Last Years Model / This Year's Model | 1:44 |
| Total length: | | | 53:18 |

== Personnel ==
- Producer – Marshall Dickson, Sonshine Ward
- Art Direction, Design – Marshall Dickson, Sonshine Ward
- Liner Notes – Peter Hook
- Photography of New Order – Kevin Cummins
- Photography of Tony Wilson – Katja Ruge
