= List of songs about Manchester =

The following is a list of songs about Manchester, United Kingdom.

- The 1975 - "The City"
- Beautiful south – "Manchester"
- Brian and Michael – "Matchstalk Men and Matchstalk Cats and Dogs" (1978) (And parts of Ancoats where I used to play; about Manchester artist L. S. Lowry)
- The Courteeners – "Fallowfield Hillbilly"
- The Courteeners – "The Opener"
- Davy Jones – "Manchester Boy"
- Doves – "M62 Song"
- Doves – "Northenden"
- The Durutti Column – "28 Oldham" (The address of Factory Records' DryBar FAC201)
- The Durutti Column – "Longsight Romance"
- The Durutti Column – "Sketch for a Manchester Summer 1989"
- Eels – "Manchester Girl"
- Elbow – "Forget Myself"
- Elbow – "Great Expectations" (About the 135 Bury–Manchester Bus Route)
- Elbow – "Grounds for Divorce" (About The Temple, a bar in Manchester)
- Elbow – "Station Approach"
- Ewan MacColl – "The Manchester Rambler"
- The Fall – "Bury"
- The Fall – "Cheetham Hill"
- The Fall – "City Hobgoblins" (Queen Victoria is a large black slug in Piccadilly Manchester)
- The Fall – "Fit And Working Again" (Reception room, Victoria Station)
- The Fivepenny Piece – "City of Manchester"
- The Freshies – "I'm in Love With the Girl on the Manchester Virgin Megastore Checkout Desk"
- Fritz von Runte – "Abraham Moss Eternal"
- Fritz von Runte – "Basses o’ th’ Bard"
- Fritz von Runte – "Bowker Vale Breeze (Are We There Yet)"
- Fritz von Runte – "Bury Bliss (Cheese at Home)"
- Fritz von Runte – "Crumpet is All"
- Fritz von Runte – "Heat-on Heat-off"
- Fritz von Runte – "Prestwich Places"
- Fritz von Runte – "Queens Road Reverie (Sound as a Bound)"
- Fritz von Runte – "Rad Cliff-hanger"
- Fritz von Runte – "Shudehill Shuffle"
- Fritz von Runte – "Victoria Velvet (Manchester Ambient City)"
- Fritz von Runte – "Whitefield Whispers"
- Gomez – "Whippin' Piccadilly"
- John Shuttleworth – "You're Like Manchester"
- Hair soundtrack – "Manchester"
- Herman's Hermits – "It's Nice to be Out in the Morning"
- Ian Brown – "Longsight M13"
- Inspiral Carpets – "Sackville" (About the red light district in Manchester)
- John Cooper Clarke – "Beasley Street"
- Joyce (singer) – "The Band on the Wall"
- Lionrock – "Snapshot on Pollard St."
- Lionrock – "Wilmslow Rd."
- Marie Laforêt – "Manchester et Liverpool"
- Mike Harding – "Strangeways Hotel"
- Mint Royale – "From Rusholme with Love"
- Oasis – "Half The World Away"
- Oasis – "Round Are Way"
- Oasis – "Shakermaker" (Mr Sifter sold me songs, when I was just sixteen)
- Pomona (folksong) – Music hall song
- Shifty – "Manchester"
- The Smiths – "Cemetery Gates" (about Southern Cemetery)
- The Smiths – "Miserable Lie" (What do we get for our trouble and pain but a rented room in Whalley Range?)
- The Smiths – "Rusholme Ruffians"
- The Smiths – "Suffer Little Children" (Oh Manchester, so much to answer for; about the Moors murders)
- The Smiths – "The Headmaster Ritual" (Belligerent ghouls run Manchester schools)
- The Spinners – "Flowers of Manchester"
- St Winifred's School Choir – "There's No One Quite Like Grandma" (1980)
- The Stone Roses – "Daybreak" (from Atlanta, Georgia to Longsight, Manchester)
- The Stone Roses – "Mersey Paradise" (seeing as it runs through South Manchester)
- Take That – "Mancunian Way"
- The Times – "Manchester"
- Tractor – "Drunken Angels and Sad Clowns aka- Manchester"
- Tractor – "Peterloo"
