= Matt Butcher Me and My Friends =

Me and My Friends
- Me and My Friends

Studio album by Matt Butcher
- Released: 2008
- Recorded: 2008
- Genre: Folk, Americana, rock, country
- Producer: Justin Beckler

Professional ratings
Review scores
Source	Rating
Reax Music Magazine	4.5/5 stars
Orlando Sentinel	(A)

Me and My Friends is a 2008 album by Matt Butcher, accompanied by "The Revolvers". The album received overwhelmingly positive reviews, including commentaries from the Orlando Weekly, The Daily Times and KillerPop.

== Track listing ==
1. "Me and My Friends" - 4:42
2. "On My Mind" - 3:26
3. "Giving My Sadness a Name" - 4:42
4. "Grey Skies, Green Shoes" - 4:27
5. "Paper Dolls" - 4:08
6. "A Famous Country Singer" - 4:54
7. "The Company I Keep" - 4:06
8. "Woman Left Waiting" - 4:04
9. "Keep it Together" - 3:44
10. "Grace on a Greyhound Bus" - 4:02
11. "Sinking Ships" - 4:00
