= Chris Barrows =

American vocalist and songwriter

- Born: Wichita, Kansas
- Origin: Tampa, Florida
- Genres: Punk rock
- Occupations: Vocalist, songwriter
- Years active: 1986–present
- Label: 24 Hour Service Station
- Website: Pink Lincolns at 24 Hour Service Station

Chris Barrows (born Wichita, Kansas) is an American vocalist and songwriter best known as frontman of the punk band Pink Lincolns. Barrows co-founded The Pink Lincolns in 1986 in Tampa, Florida, quickly becoming known for his "trademark snotty humor" and stage antics. Still active in Florida, the band has released a number of albums and EPs including splits such as Screeching Weasel/Pink Lincolns Split and Live At Some Prick's House with The Queers. In 1998 Barrows released one album as vocalist of the group The Jackie Papers, and in 2009 he released the album Shove while vocalist of the punk group The Spears. His debut solo album, Human Being, will be released by 24 Hour Service Station on September 9, 2014.

== Music career ==
=== 1986-97: Founding Pink Lincolns ===
Chris Barrows was born in Wichita, Kansas, and later moved to Tampa, Florida. He first started his music career as vocalist of the local punk group Pink Lincolns, which he co-founded with guitarist Dorsey Martin. Barrows had first met Dorsey while hanging out with the local punk band Not Much; Barrows was friends with their guitarist, and Dorsey was in the band as well. The rest of the Pink Lincoln's lineup has frequently changed and currently includes bassist Kevin Coss and drummer Jeff Fox, who joined in 2005.

"The Pink Lincolns quickly established themselves as funny, no-holds-barred purveyors of Ramones-influenced punk rock... the combo of Dorsey Martin and Chris Barrows in the Pink Lincolns has, for 20-plus-years, yielded some of the most exciting and humorous takes on what sometimes is the all-too serious world of punk rock."
— Miami New Times

Their first album was "Back From The Pink Room", released in 1987. The band has since released four more studio albums, one live album and six EP's as well as splits with Screeching Weasel and The Queers. The band's track have appeared on over 20 compilations from labels like Lookout, Stiff Pole and Choking Hazard.

About their later EP Sumo Fumes, released in 1993, Miami New Times wrote "opening the slab of wax is a raucous rendition of Wire's "Ex-Lion Tamer" that is somehow better and completely owned in the hands of this band... This is followed by the pure rock and roll snot of "Tarzan #2" where they assert themselves with an original take on Edgar Rice Burrough's canon. The band closes out the B-side with another cover, this time of the Psychedelic Furs; 'Pretty in Pink.'"

The cover for the band's 1994 album Suck and Bloat was drawn by Iggy Pop, and their 1997 album Pure Swank was produced by Bill Stevenson of The Descendents. Notable songs include "Velvet Elvis", a story about a squabble over a velvet painting of Elvis Presley.

=== 1998: The Jackie Papers ===
Around 1998 Barrows took a break from Pink Lincolns and founded the band The Jackie Papers in Florida. Beyond Barrows on vocals and guitar, there was Jenny Page on guitar, Heidi Flanigan on bass and vocals, and Heather Now on drums. About The Jackie Papers, Miami New Times wrote that "while it can be argued that the music is similar to The Pink Lincolns, there is without a doubt a stronger hardcore edge...chockfull of Barrows' trademark snotty humor."

In September 1998 the band recorded their only album at Morrisound Studios along with producer Steve Heritage. Mixing was handled by Bill Stevenson and Stephen Egerton. About their album Uckfay Ooyay, released that year on Stiff Pole Records, Miami New Times wrote, "The midsection of the album is an instrumental piece titled 'Coolio Iglesias' that is pretty cool and sloppy garage rock with metal tinges. Their cover of Screeching Weasel's 'Hey Suburbia' is amped-up in a slightly more hardcore vein. 'Addiction' does a good job of Heidi's vocals and it comes off as a creepy intersection of L7 and The Breeders."

=== 2005-09: Pink Lincolns albums ===
After an eight-year hiatus from studio recording, the Pink Lincolns got together and recorded the original album No Lo Siento in 2004. It was their last studio recording, and released in 2005 on Hazzard Records. Bill Stevenson produced. Afterwards several of their albums were remastered and released by Jailhouse, starting with Back From The Pink Room in 2008 and Suck And Bloat in 2009, both released on vinyl and CD.

About when they release album, and their habit of not syncing tours with album releases, Barrows has stated, "We got back together and had new stuff so we were going to do an album. When we have an album's worth of shit, we'll do it. We're on our own schedule. We don't have to put out an album every year whether it sucks or not, ya know. We just.... when we have shit we wanna do, we do it."

=== 2007-09: The Spears ===
On September 15, 2009, he released the album Shove as part of the punk group The Spears, which he co-founded around 2007 Signed to Jailhouse Records, The Spears lineup consisted of Barrows on vocals, Sam Williams (Down By Law) on guitar, Gary Strickland (vocalist of Hated Youth) on bass, and Rob Rampy (D.R.I.) on drums. A remastered version of Shove was released in 2013.

=== 2012-14: Yinz and Human Being ===
In 2012 the Pink Lincolns released their first live album on 24 Hour Service Station. Recorded live at Pittsburgh's 31st Street Pub on April 21, 2005, Yinz: The Live Album has a lineup featuring bassist Kevin Coss and drummer Jeff Fox. Among many of their original tracks, the album includes a cover of Flipper's "Sex Bomb."

Barrows' first solo album, Human Being, is due out September 9, 2014 on 24 Hour Service Station. The album features guest vocals by Ben Weasel of Screeching Weasel on the track "Not It," while The Dwarves' He Who Cannot Be Named contributes Farfisa organ to the track "Be My Girl" and "Human Being." Among the tracks are "Champs," are cover of the Wire song from the Pink Flag album, with Lianna Hoffman contributing cello.

== Style and equipment ==
According to Jailhouse Records, "Although frequently lumped into the pop punk category, many fans identify [Pink Lincolns] as hardcore, which given Chris Barrows stage antics, insanely rowdy shows and almost famously raucous crowds over the years, the hardcore label definitely seems appropriate."

== Discography ==
=== Solo material ===
Albums by Chris Barrows
| Year | Album title | Release details |
|---|---|---|
| 2014 | Human Being | Released: Sep 9, 2014; Label: 24 Hour Service Station; Format: digital |

Selected songs by Chris Barrows
| Year | Title | Album | Certifications |
|---|---|---|---|
| 2014 | "Human Being" | Human Being | |
| 2014 | "Short Attention Span" | Human Being | |

=== With Pink Lincolns ===
Albums

- 1988: Back From the Pink Room
- 1989: Headache
- 1994: Suck and Bloat
- 1997: Pure Swank
- 2005: No Lo Siento
- 2012: Yinz: The Live Album

EPs

- 1987: Cotton Mather
- 1989: Tragedy for Tea Free
- 1993: Sumo Fumes
- 1995: Sumo Fumes 2
- 1995: V.M. Live
- 1996: Sumo Fumes 3

Split EPs

- 1993: Screeching Weasel/Pink Lincolns Split (with Screeching Weasel)
- 1994: Live At Some Prick's House (with The Queers)
- 1997: Submachine/Pink Lincolns Split (with Submachine)

=== With The Jackie Papers ===
| Year | Album title | Release details |
|---|---|---|
| 1998 | Uckfay Ooyay | Released: 1998; Label: Stiff Pole Records; Format: CD |
| 1999 | I'm In Love EP | Released: Label: Panic Button/Lookout; Format: CD, 12" vinyl |

=== With The Spears ===
Albums by The Spears
| Year | Album title | Release details |
|---|---|---|
| 2009 | Shove | Released: Sep 15, 2009; Label: Jailhouse Records; Format: LP, CD, digital |
| 2013 | Shove: Remastered | Released: Jun 25, 2013; Label: 24 Hour Service Station; Format: CD |

Singles by The Spears
| Year | Title | Album | Release details |
|---|---|---|---|
| 2007 | "People Are Bad" | N/A | Choking Hazard Records, 7" vinyl |

=== Guest appearances ===
Selected guest appearances by Chris Barrows
| Yr | Release title | Artist(s) | Label, date | Role |
|---|---|---|---|---|
| 2008 | Goodbye Sanity EP | Teenage Rehab | Jailhouse Records | Guest vocals |
| 2009 | Let's Be Enemies | Teenage Rehab | Jailhouse Records | Lyrical contributions |
| 2013 | Punk Is Not Dead | Sack | 24 Hour Service Station | Vocals |

== See also ==
- Pink Lincolns
