= Beauville =

Beauville may refer to:

- Beauville, Haute-Garonne, a commune in the department of Haute-Garonne in France
- Beauville, Lot-et-Garonne, a commune in the department of Lot-et-Garonne in France
- Chevrolet Beauville, a station wagon and later a van manufactured by General Motors
- The Beauvilles, an Ybor City-based Indie rock band.

== See also ==
- Biéville-Beuville, commune in the Calvados department
