= Riley Anderson =

Riley Anderson or Andersen may refer to:

- E. Riley Anderson, American attorney, politician, and jurist who served as Chief Justice of the Tennessee Supreme Court from 1990 to 2006
- Riley Anderson, former keyboardist for Kingsbury (band)
- Riley Anderson, one of the victims of the Thibodaux Massacre
- Riley Anderson, from the 2016, 2017, and 2018 Texas A&M Aggies football team
- Riley Anderson, played by Megan Lawless in Hulu's biographical crime drama The Girl from Plainville
- Riley Andersen, in whose mind most of Pixar's Inside Out franchise takes place
- Riley Anderson, a missing girl in Strays (2023 film)
