= When We Are Cats =

EP by John Ralston
- Released: 2005
- Genre: Alternative rock, acoustic, folk

When We Are Cats is the first solo EP by John Ralston after his band Legends of Rodeo went on indefinite hiatus. Only 500 copies were originally pressed on clear vinyl. When We Are Cats was later re-recorded for the debut full length Needle Bed. Fake Emergency later appeared on the Box of Chocolates EP that accompanied Needle Bed's re-release by Vagrant Records.

== Track listing ==
1. When We Are Cats
2. You Will Come Down
3. Fake Emergency
4. Quarantin’d
