= Hallucination Recordings =

American record label

Hallucination Recordings is an American record label created in 1992 and originally co-founded in Tampa by brothers, Monk and David Christophere as a platform to release their music as Rabbit in the Moon. Hallucination, with the current leadership and A & R of DJ¹s Three and Monk, has since moved on to include several other artists, including Jackal & Hyde, Beautiful Confusion, Soulrider, Second-Hand Satellites, Reverse Commuter, House Wrecka and Pimp Juice.

== Selected discography ==
- HAL 001: Anarch-E - The Punk Rock EP (12") (1992)
- HAL 002: Rabbit in the Moon - Out of Body Experience/Freak to the Beat (12") (1993)
- HAL 003: Anarch-E - Krazy Train / Rize Above (12") (1993)
- HAL 004: Rabbit in the Moon - Orisha/DubAsSex (12") (1993)
- HAL 005: Rabbit in the Moon - Untitled/The EP that Never Was (Limited Edition 12") (1995)
- HAL 006: Rabbit in the Moon - Deeper (Limited Edition 12") (1997)
- HAL 008: Jackal & Hyde - Beyond / Get Down To My Technique (12") (1997)
- HAL 009: Rabbit in the Moon - Floori.d.a (2x12" and CD Maxi) (1998)
- HAL 011: Rabbit in the Moon - Rabbit In the Moon Remixes Volume 2 (3x12" and CD) (1999)
- HAL 013: Second Hand Satellites - Multiple Mirrors EP (12") (2000)
- HAL 015: Rabbit in the Moon - Rabbit In the Moon Remixes Volume 1 (3x12" and CD) (1998)

== See also ==
- List of record labels
