= The Heathens =

American indie rock band

- Origin: Orlando, Florida
- Genres: Americana, indie rock, country
- Years active: 2005–2007
- Labels: Post records
- Past members: Matt Butcher, Jeff Ilgenfritz, Sean Moore, Chris Cucci, Chris Rae

The Heathens were an Americana, indie rock band hailing from the Orlando, Florida area. Their first album, Big White House, was released by Post*Records in 2006.

== History ==
The band formed at Austin Coffee & Film in Winter Park, Florida in early 2005. They earned an opening slot for Hank Williams III as part of the Anti-POP Music Festival at the Social in Orlando. Building momentum on the success and release of their first music video for the song "Stickin' Around," the video was accepted at the Los Angeles Film Fest in May 2006, where it played alongside the likes of other such notable artists as Beck, Yeah Yeah Yeahs, The White Stripes, Nine Inch Nails, Death Cab for Cutie, The Go! Team, The Shins, and Bright Eyes. At the Florida Music Festival of 2006, the video for "Stickin' Around" won the Audience Choice Award for Best Selection. After signing onto Central Florida based Post*Records in 2005, the band released their debut release on July 4, 2006, entitled Big White House, recorded in Gainesville, Florida by Rob McGregor (producer for Alkaline Trio, Rumbleseat, Against Me!, and Hot Water Music). The Heathens played their last show in the Backbooth on 06.16.2007 at the Stone Soup Festival.

== Discography ==
- Big White House (2006)
- Post*Records & Friends Present: Ole! (compilation) (2006)
