= Screeching Weasel / Pink Lincolns =

Screeching Weasel/Pink Lincolns split

EP (Split) by Screeching Weasel / Pink Lincolns
- Released: 1993
- Genre: Punk rock
- Label: V.M.L. Records

Screeching Weasel/Pink Lincolns Split is a split EP featuring US punk bands Screeching Weasel and the Pink Lincolns. The song "Going Home" previously appeared on the CD version of Screeching Weasel's album Wiggle, while "Stab Stab Stab" later appeared on the bands B-sides compilation Kill the Musicians. "Runnin' Down" is a cover of a song by the Gargoyles.

== Track listing ==
=== Side A (Screeching Weasel) ===
1. "Stab Stab Stab" (Ben Weasel)
2. "Going Home" (Aaron Cometbus, Ben Weasel)

=== Side B (Pink Lincolns) ===
1. "Three Chord Song" (Dorsey Martin)
2. "Runnin' Down" (Tim Storm, Lisa Lombardo)

== Personnel ==
The following are credited for this work:

Screeching Weasel

- Ben Weasel - vocals, guitar on track 1
- John Jughead - guitar
- Danny Vapid - bass on track 1, guitar on track 2
- Johnny Personality - bass on track 2
- Dan Panic - drums

Pink Lincolns

- Chris Barrows - vocals
- John Yovino - guitar
- Dorsey Martin - bass
- Paul Moroz - drums
