= Live at Some Prick's House =

EP by the Queers and the Pink Lincolns
- Released: 1994
- Recorded: June 8, 1991 (The Queers); October 31, 1993 (Pink Lincolns)
- Venues: WMBR, Cambridge (The Queers); Sombre Reptile, Atlanta (Pink Lincolns)
- Genre: Punk rock
- Label: Just Add Water (JAW 001)
- Producer: Carl Plaster (The Queers)

The Queers chronology
Look Ma No Flannel! (1994)	Live at Some Prick's House (1994)	Rocket to Russia (1994)

Pink Lincolns chronology
Suck and Bloat (1994)	Live at Some Prick's House (1994)	Sumo Fumes 2 (1995)

Live at Some Prick's House is an EP by the American punk rock bands the Queers and the Pink Lincolns, released in 1994 by independent record label Just Add Water Records. A split release, it includes five songs recorded by the Queers during a June 1991 performance on the Massachusetts Institute of Technology's campus radio station WMBR, and three songs performed by the Pink Lincolns on Halloween 1993 at the Sombre Reptile in Atlanta, including a cover version of Bikini Kill's "Suck My Left One".

== Reception ==
Reviewing the EP for AllMusic, critic Mike DaRonco rated it two stars out of five, remarking that "because all of the songs on this record can be found elsewhere with a better production—and in the case of the Queers side, they're available on their live album Suck This—Live at Some Prick's House is more for the dedicated fans of both of these bands."

== Track listing ==
Writing credits adapted from the EP's liner notes and those of the Queers' A Day Late and a Dollar Short.

Side A: The Queers live on WMBR, June 8, 1991
No.	Title	Writer(s)	Length
1.	"We'd Have a Riot Doing Heroin"	Scott "Tulu" Gildersleeve
2.	"This Place Sucks"	"Joe Queer" King, Jack "Wimpy Rutherford" Hayes
3.	"Kicked Out of the Webelos"	Queer, Rutherford
4.	"I Want Cunt"	Tulu
5.	"Nobody Likes Me"	Queer, Rutherford

Side B: Pink Lincolns live at the Sombre Reptile, Atlanta, October 31, 1993
No.	Title	Writer(s)	Length
6.	"I've Got My Tie On"	Chris Barrows
7.	"Suck My Left One" (originally performed by Bikini Kill)	Kathleen Hanna, Billy Karren, Tobi Vail, Kathi Wilcox
8.	"Big Bouncer, Angry Bouncer"	Barrows

== Personnel ==
Credits adapted from the EP's liner notes.

The Queers

- Joe Queer (Joe King) – lead vocals, guitar
- B-Face (Chris Barnard) – bass guitar, backing vocals, cover illustration
- Hugh O'Neill – drums

Pink Lincolns

- Chris Barrows – lead vocals
- Dorsey Martin – guitar
- Paul Johnston – guitar
- Jim Belogna – bass guitar
- Fred Stoltz – drums

Production

- Carl Plaster – producer and audio engineer of Queers tracks
- Jim Tierney – mastering of Queers tracks

Artwork

- Julie Rose – photographs of the Queers
