= Matt Butcher (musician) =

- Born: Matthew John Butcher; 5 August 1983 (age 43); Birmingham, England
- Genres: Folk, Americana, Rock, Country
- Occupation: Singer-songwriter
- Instruments: Vocals, guitar, harmonica, keyboards
- Years active: 2003–present
- Website: mattbutchermusic.com

Matt Butcher (born 5 August 1983) is an English folk, Americana, country, independent recording artist from Orlando, Florida. Butcher, former lead singer of Orlando's The Heathens, recorded his first solo album during the summer of 2008. Entitled Me and My Friends, the album was released independently in autumn 2008 and was voted one of the ten best of that year in the Orlando Sentinel.

== History ==
Born in England in 1983, Butcher spent his youth moving with his family; first to London, then to Amsterdam then to Colorado Springs before finally settling in Orlando in 1999. Learning to play the guitar at an early age, Butcher soon joined a series of local bands in Orlando, culminating with a position as lead singer and songwriter for The Heathens. The band enjoyed moderate success, releasing one album, "Big White House", and touring the East Coast of the United States. After leaving The Heathens in August 2006 to pursue his own songwriting, Matt Butcher began playing with a series of different musicians to find a sound quality that would suit his distinctive style. Having opened as a solo artist for The Avett Brothers, Conor Oberst, and The Felice Brothers Butcher was ready to add additional instruments to fully accompany his songs.

== The Revolvers ==
Starting first with Pedal Steel player Tom Cooper, Butcher soon added Daniel Berry on drums, Matthew Mendel on keyboard and vocals, Dave Chmil on guitar and vocals and Gus Ramage on bass. The newly named "Revolvers", both as an homage to the gunslinging South Butcher so often imbues and the multi-instrumentalist abilities of the players in the band, began almost immediately playing as Butcher's backing band at local Orlando venues, and soon built a loyal following; culminating in a sold out CD-release show for Me and My Friends. The album, produced by Justin Beckler and self-funded by Butcher, was given four and a half stars from five by Reax Music Magazine, saying, "Matt Butcher has carved out his own immediately recognizable niche, a dewey-praire [sic] mix of wistfulness and confession executed with a deceptively light touch that only barely suggests the material's substance... and it only gets better with repeated listens."

== Present activities ==
After the success of his debut album, Matt Butcher and his backing band the Revolvers opened for The Avett Brothers on their Florida tour dates.

After the construction and debut of his personal website in September 2009, Butcher opted to emulate Radiohead and follow the "pay as you go" business model of In Rainbows. for the digital distribution of his music.

== Discography ==
- Me and My Friends (2008)
- Ghostwriting (2011)
- The Kids Are Gone (2014)
- Matt Butcher (2015)
