= Pink Lincolns =

American punk rock band

- Origin: Tampa, Florida, United States
- Genres: Punk rock
- Years active: 1986–present
- Labels: Stiff Pole Records, Hazzard Records, 24 Hour Service Station
- Members: Chris Barrows; Dorsey Martin; Kevin Coss; Jeff Fox

The Pink Lincolns are a punk rock band formed in Tampa, Florida in 1986 by vocalist Chris Barrows and guitarist Dorsey Martin. The rest of the lineup has frequently changed and currently includes bassist Kevin Coss and drummer Jeff Fox. The band has released five studio albums, one live album and six EP's as well as splits with Screeching Weasel and The Queers. The cover for the band's album Suck and Bloat was drawn by Iggy Pop, and their album Pure Swank was produced by Bill Stevenson of The Descendents. Notable songs include "Velvet Elvis", a story about a squabble over a velvet painting of Elvis Presley.

== Members ==
Current as of 2019

- Chris Barrows - vocals (1986–present)
- Kevin Coss - bass
- Jeff Fox - drums

Past members

- John Yovino- guitar
- Paul Moroz- drums
- Paul Johnston - guitar
- Griff Draycott - drums
- Chris Lunceford - bass
- Fred Stoltz - drums
- Jim Belonga - bass
- Dorsey Martin - guitar

== Discography ==
=== Studio albums ===
Studio albums by Pink Lincolns
Year	Album title	Release details
1988	Back From the Pink Room	Label: Greedy Bastard Records; Format: LP, CD
1989	Headache	Label: Musical Tragedies; Format: LP
1994	Suck and Bloat	Label: Stiff Pole Records; Format: LP, CD
1997	Pure Swank	Label: Stiff Pole Records; Format: LP, CD
2005	No Lo Siento	Label: Hazzard Records; Format: CD, digital
2008	Back From The Pink Room, Remastered	Label: Jailhouse! Records; Format: LP, CD, digital
2009	Suck And Bloat, Remastered	Label: Jailhouse! Records; Format: CD, digital

=== Live albums ===
Live albums by Pink Lincolns
Year	Album title	Release details
2012	Yinz: The Live Album	Released: Sep 11, 2012; Label: 24 Hour Service Station; Format: CD, digital

=== EPs ===
EPs by Pink Lincolns
Year	Album title	Release details
1987	Cotton Mather	Label: Rigid Records; Format: 7" vinyl
1989	Tragedy for Tea Free	Label: Musical Tragedies; Format: 7" vinyl
1993	Sumo Fumes	Label: Stiff Pole Records; Format: 7" vinyl
1995	Sumo Fumes 2	Label: Stiff Pole Records; Format: 7" vinyl
1995	V.M. Live	Label: V.M.L. Records; Format: 7" vinyl
1996	Sumo Fumes 3	Label: Stiff Pole Records; Format: 7" vinyl
2021	I am a Genius	Label: Rad Girlfriend Records; Format: 7" vinyl

=== Split EPs ===
Splits by Pink Lincolns
Year	Album title	Release details
1993	Screeching Weasel/Pink Lincolns Split (with Screeching Weasel)	Label: V.M.L. Records; Format: 7" vinyl
1994	Live At Some Prick's House (with The Queers)	Label: Just Add Water Records; Format: 7" vinyl
1997	Submachine/Pink Lincolns Split (with Submachine)	Label: Just Add Water Records; Format: 7" vinyl

=== Compilations ===
Compilations by Pink Lincolns
Year	Album title	Release details
2004	Background Check	Label: Hazzard Records; Format: CD, Digital
2013	Milking It	Label: Stiff Pole Records; Format: CD, Digital

=== Other contributions ===
- 1987: Have-A-Tampa (Pop Records)
- 1992: Blame and Burn (Flush Records)
- 1994: Punk USA (Lookout! Records)
- 1995: Water Music (Just Add Water Records)
- 1996: Welcome to Florida... (Stiff Pole Records)
- 1996: Rational Enquirer (Rational Inquirer)
- 1997: More Bounce to The Ounce (Lookout! Records)
- 1997: Show and Tell - A Stormy Remembrance of TV Theme Tunes (Which Records?)
- 1999: My So Called Punk Rock Life (Melted Records)
- 1999: V.M.L. Live (Liberation Records)
- 2008: Goodbye Sanity EP by Teenage Rehab (Jailhouse Records) - Chris Barrows guest vocals
- 2009: Let's Be Enemies by Teenage Rehab(Jailhouse Records) - Chris Barrows lyric contributions
- 2009: People Are Bad by The Spears (Jailhouse Records) - Chris Barrows vocalist
- 2009: Shove by The Spears (Jailhouse Records) - Chris Barrows vocalist

== See also ==
- Punk rock
