= Lamorna (folk song) =

Cornish traditional folk ballad

Lyrics (Lamorna)

So now I'll sing to you, about a maiden fair,
I met the other evening at the corner of the square.
She had a dark and roving eye, she was a charming rover,
And we rode all night, through the pale moonlight
away down to Lamorna.

Chorus
Twas down in Albert square
I never shall forget,
Her eyes they shone like diamonds
and the evening it was wet, wet, wet.
Her hair hung down in curls,
she was a charming rover,
And we rode all night,
through the pale moonlight,
away down to Lamorna.

As we got in the cab, I asked her for her name,
And when she gave it me, well, mine it was the same,
So I lifted up her veil, for her face was covered over,
And to my surprise, it was my wife,
I took down to Lamorna.

Chorus

She said, I know you now, I knew you all along,
I knew you in the dark, but I did it for a lark,
And for that lark you'll pay, for the taking of the donah:
You'll pay the fare, for I declare,
away down to Lamorna.

Chorus

Lamorna (Roud 16636) is a traditional folk song/ballad associated with Cornwall, and dealing with the courtship of a man and a woman, who turned out to be his wife. The title comes from Lamorna, a village in west Cornwall. Sheet music held in the British Library dates the song to 1910.

Lamorna is a Cornish adaptation of a music hall song titled Pomona or Away down to Pomona which originates from Manchester in the north west of England. 'Albert Square' is a square in front of Manchester Town Hall, and Pomona Palace and gardens were a site of popular entertainment in Cornbrook, Old Trafford, southwest of the city centre. (Pomona Docks were built on the site of the Pomona Gardens.) Inglis Gundry notes in his introduction to Canow Kernow (published by the Federation of Old Cornwall Societies, 1966): '...the process of balladry still goes on. In the Logan Rock Inn at Treen a popular song called Way down Albert Square is gradually being transformed into a folk-song called Lamorna." And at the time of the publication of his seminal collection of songs and dances from Cornwall he did not consider the song sufficiently old or important enough to be included in his selection.

The song became popular in Cornwall the 1960s and 70s through performance in Cornish folk clubs and has since gained wider currency. Versions of the song have been recorded by Brenda Wootton, The Yetties, and The Spinners (on the album All Day Singing, 1977).

== Notes ==
- It is claimed that the Albert Square in the song was a place in Penzance now called Albert Street. There are claims by the folk group The Yetties, that Albert Square was in fact in Manchester and the place was Pomona Docks. There is an "Albert Square" in St Just in Penwith, about 5/6 miles from Lamorna.
- The cab referred to in the song would have been a horse-drawn cab (an essentially urban vehicle, most unlikely to be found in a small coastal village).
- donah in verse 3, pronounced 'doe-na', is slang for a woman; (perhaps from Italian donna or Lingua Franca dona) which had been adopted into London argot by the early 1890s.
- Some versions of the song interchange roved with rode both versions are acceptable.
- "they rode all night" comes from the habit of couples hiring a cab with curtained windows so that the two could "be alone" for several hours if necessary. Women (possibly married) would disguise themselves with a veil so that they would not be recognised by their acquaintances while they picked up a young gentleman for the evening.

== Other possible origins ==
The songs below share some of the key lyrics and are mainly sea shanties.

=== "So, we'll go no more a roving" ===
Her eyes are like two stars so bright,
Mark you well what I say!
Her eyes are like two stars so bright,
Her face is fair, her step is light;
I'll go no more a roving from you, fair maid.

=== "The Black Velvet Band" ===
And her eyes they shined like diamonds,
I thought her the pride of the land.
Her hair hung over her shoulder,
Tied up with a black velvet band.

=== "Dark and Roving Eye" ===
Oh she'd a dark and a rovin' eye and her hair hung down in ringlets
She were a nice girl, a decent girl but one of the rakish kind
