= Leslie Winer =

American musician, poet, and writer

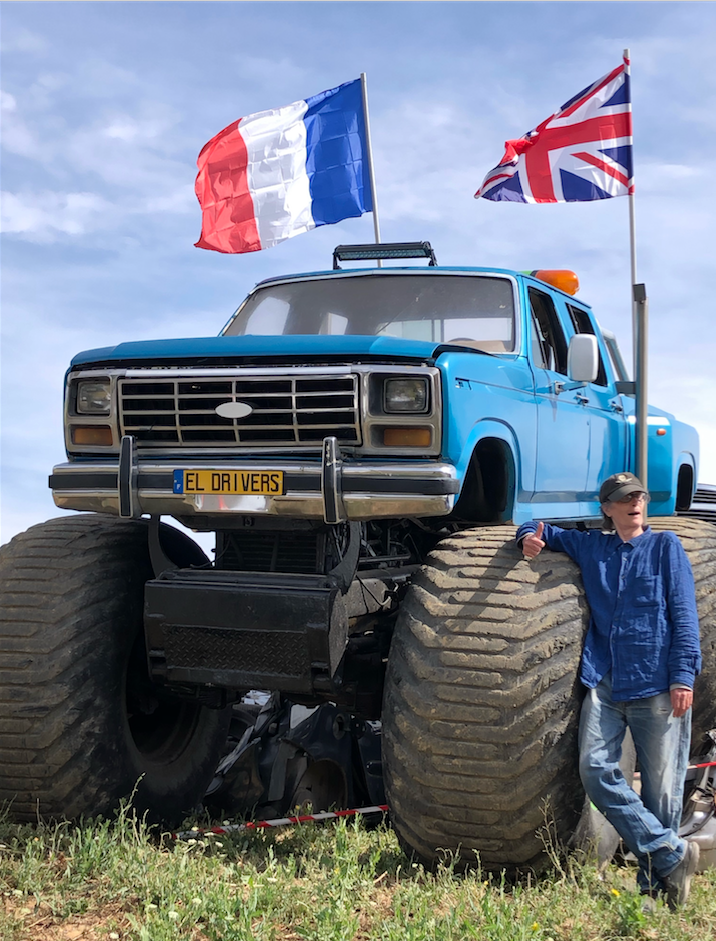

Background information
- Born: Baby Girl Maguire; December 24, 1958; Boston, Massachusetts, United States
- Occupations: Singer-songwriter, writer, musician, poet
- Labels: Transglobal, Rhythm King, Light in the Attic

Leslie Winer (born December 24, 1958) is an American musician, poet, and writer. She began her career as a high fashion model before she transitioned into music.

== Early life ==
Winer was born in Boston to a teenager and handed over to her adoptive grandmother in a hospital parking lot in what was an illegal adoption involving the exchange of money. She grew up in Weston, Massachusetts. She relocated to New York City to attend the School of Visual Arts where she studied with Hannah Wilke and Joseph Kosuth.

She is of Scots-Irish, Basque, Mi’kmaq, and Acadian descent.

== Modeling career ==
Winer began her career as a fashion model in 1980. Fashion designer Jean Paul Gaultier described her as "the first androgynous model."

Winer appeared in fashion campaigns for Valentino, Christian Dior and Chloé. She also appeared on the magazine cover of Vogue Italia Pelle, Vogue Gioiello, and Vogue Australia. She continued to model throughout the 1980s.

In 2014, Winer returned to modeling as the face of Vivienne Westwood's spring/summer 2014 campaign.

== Musical career ==
After her work brought her to London in the mid-1980s, she spent a great deal of time at Leigh Bowery's nightclub, Taboo. While in London she met musicians Jah Wobble, former bassist for Public Image Ltd, and Kevin Mooney, former bass player for Adam and the Ants.

In 1987, Winer co-wrote the track "Just Call Me Joe" with Sinéad O'Connor. The song would appear on O'Connor's debut album, The Lion and the Cobra, with Winer performing the backup spoken vocal. In 1988, she began recording under the name '©'. Winer recorded her first song, "Kind of Easy," with Karl Bonnie from Renegade Soundwave.

In 1990, Winer recorded the album Witch with Wobble and Mooney. BBC Radio 1 DJ John Peel played some tracks off this white label and the record went on to become a small cult classic prompting NME to refer to Winer as "The Grandmother of Triphop".

In 1991, she moved to Miami and was working at Island Records founder Chris Blackwell's South Beach Studios, where she recorded her albums 3 Bags Full and Spider.

Helmut Lang did a small pressing of her album Spider that he released in his NYC shop sometime around 1999 to promote one of his shows. Winer occasionally records music with Swedish composer Carl Michael von Hausswolff and others. She has also worked with Grace Jones.

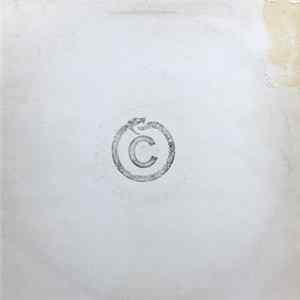
First white label London 1989 ...

== Personal life ==
Winer had a friendship with writer William S. Burroughs and credits him with being a major mentor. Burroughs mentions his friendship with Winer in a number of interviews and books with French journalist Alain Pacadis and Burroughs’ own last book Last Words: The Final Journals of William S. Burroughs.

Winer dated artist Jean-Michel Basquiat early in her career.

In 1986, Winer married Kevin Mooney for "the papers." "The British wanted me to leave the country," she said.

Winer currently lives in France, where she has raised five daughters and was the executor of the estate of writer and poet Herbert Huncke.

== Discography ==
=== Albums ===
Album	Year	Artist	Note
Witch	1993	© & Leslie Winer	Debut release of the Transglobal label
Witch	1999	Leslie Winer	Re-release under her real name
Spider	1999	LW & ©	Recorded between '94 & '97
& That Dead Horse	2010	Leslie Winer	Produced by Philip Marshall / Tapeworm
Always Already	2011	Purity Supreme	4-track EP by Leslie Winer & Christophe van Huffel
&c.	2012	Leslie Winer	Produced by Philip Marshall / Tapeworm
3 Bags Full	2013	LW & ©	Completed in '94, also includes tracks from '88, '89
(1)	2015	Leslie Winer, CM von Hausswolff	Recorded and mixed in France and Sweden, 2012–13
YMFEES	2018	Leslie Winer & Jay Glass Dubs	
When I Hit You - You'll Feel It	2021	Leslie Winer	Career-spanning double vinyl anthology incl. previously unreleased tracks

=== Appears on ===
Track	Year	Artist	Release
"Just Call Me Joe"	1987	Sinéad O'Connor	The Lion and the Cobra
"You"	1991	Holger Hiller	As Is
"Counting the Rosaries (Happiness & Love Mix)"	1991	Book of Love	"Counting the Rosaries"
several tracks	1992	Max	Silence Running
"Personals"	1994	Jon Hassell & Bluescreen	Dressing for Pleasure
"If You Reach the Border"	1995	Bomb the Bass	Clear
"Calm Gunshot"	2000	Mekon featuring Leslie Winer	"Calm Gunshot"
"When I Was Walt Whitman"	2013	Mekon	Piece of Work
"This Blank Action"	2014	Diamond Version	CI
"Dave The Shoe"	2018	Christopher Chaplin	Paradise Lost
"Pioneer B"	2020	Fritz von Runte	The Last Album
"Tenderness"	2021	Maxwell Sterling	Turn Of Phrase
"Little Indian"	2024	Shelton	Little Indian (EP)
