= Fritz von Runte =

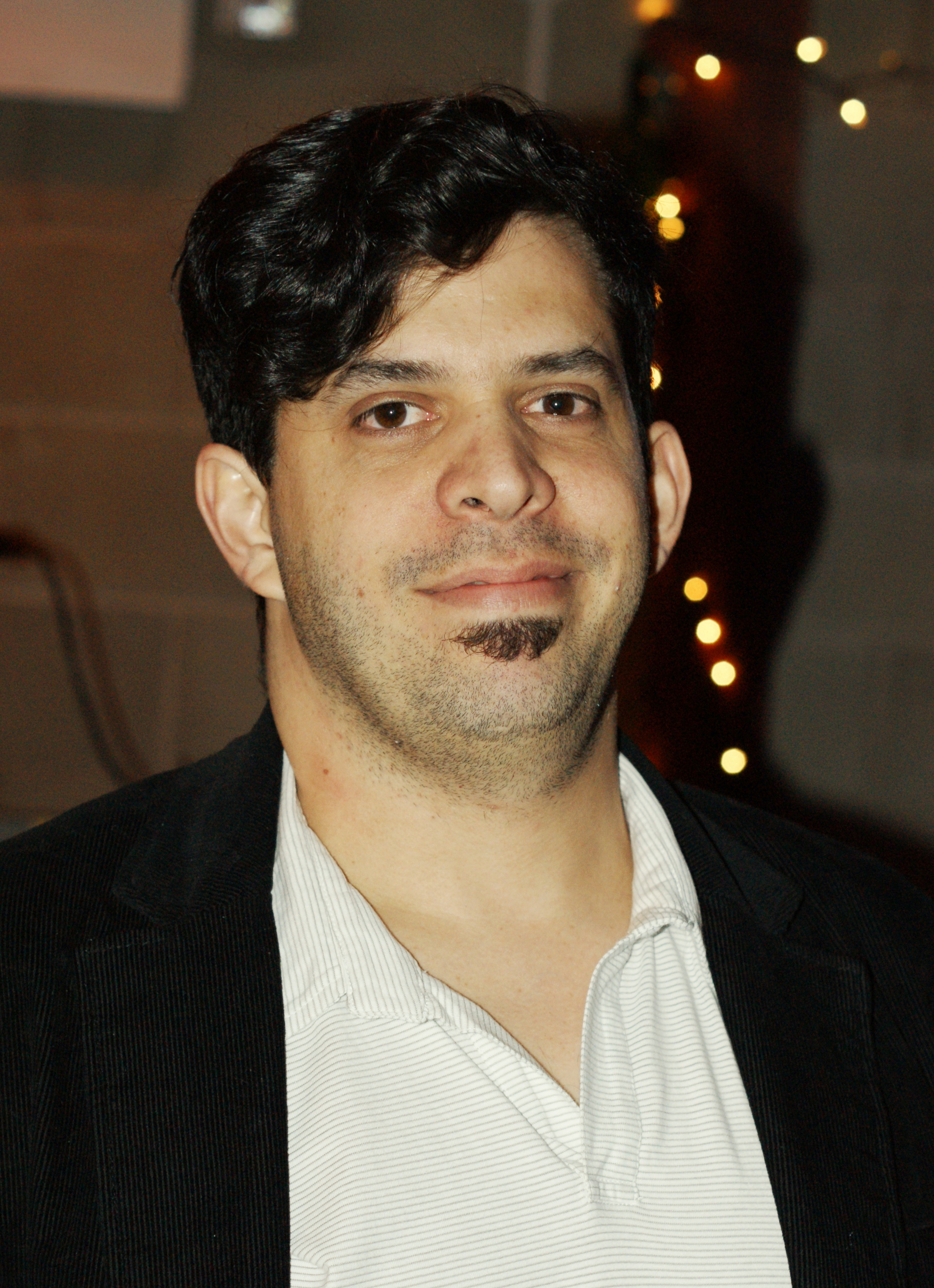

Background information
- Also known as: Doc Fritz; Büses Parkig
- Occupations: Record Producer; Remixer

Fritz von Runte is a British DJ and Producer based in Manchester, England, known for his remixes and original music projects.

Fritz is recognised for remixing artists such as 808 State, New Order, Pet Shop Boys, David Bowie, Dire Straits and Lily Allen. Notable works include The Beatles Hell, The Beatles Hate, and Lily Allen Remixed, which is reputed to be the most downloaded album in the UK.

In 2003, he began a series of mashups titled Lycantropii.

In 2011, he created Bowie 2001, which incorporates samples from Stanley Kubrick's 2001 in the remixing of David Bowie's catalogue.

In 2020, Fritz released The Last Album, his first new original album in 11 years, featuring collaborations with Leslie Winer, Beca, Peter Barakan, and long time collaborators Graham Massey and Gary Asquith.

In 2024, he launched TRAMBIENT, an innovative free musical app designed to enhance Metrolink journeys in Manchester by providing a personalised soundtrack that syncs with stations along the Bury to Shudehill tram route, creating a unique listening experience for riders.

Fritz von Runte works with the American record label 24 Hour Service Station, and releases his own material under the anti-war non-profit label Marshall Records. He regularly remixes for the self-produced WinterHits series.

== Discography ==
=== Albums ===
Year	Title	Notes
2020	The Last Album	
2018	The Bearnoises Chronicles	Released by band Bearnoises
2016	New Order Remixed	
2011	Redesigns	
2011	Bowie 2001: A Space Oddity	
2009	Lycantropii IV	As Max & Moritz
2009	Lily Allen Remixed	
2008	The Beatles Hell	
2007	Beastie Soundwave	As Renegade Boys
2006	The Beatles Hate	
2005	Thirt33n Pi3c3s [The Riot Hymns]	As Doc Fritz
2005	Lycantropii III	As Max & Moritz
2004	Lycantropii II	As Max & Moritz
2003	Lycantropii I	As Max & Moritz

=== EP ===
Year	Title	Notes
2019	Heavy Ambient	
2010	Fritz von Runte vs Freebass Redesign (digital EP)	24 Hour Service Station

=== WinterHits Mixes ===
Year	Title	Notes
2026	Reptile Dysfunktion	
2025	Orificial Limerence	
2024	Winterhits 24 48	
2022	(Vivien Leigh) Has Nowt On You	
2020	Lazaretto	
2018	The End of a Love Affair (with myself)	
2018	Paramour	
2018	Let's Be Friendly	
2018	We Used to Like Having Lunch in Transport Cafes	
2017	The Strange Connection I Have with Strangers	
2016	Prelude to Summer in Manchester	
2016	Noqqin	
2015	Nippon	
2015	Letterpressure	
2014	The Super Geniuses of the Square Table	
2014	AUTOSTOPP	
2013	The Lands	
2013	Chromophobia	
2012	909090	
2012	Downtime Minimal	
2012	Soundtrack for Imaginary Crimes of Passion	
2012	The Precociousness of the Manchester Spring	
2012	This is Radio Omneo	
2011	The Persistence of the Manchester Summer	
2011	Fag Breaks	
2011	All is Lung	
2011	Transcendental Rumination	
2011	The Elephant Tape	
2011	Superfly Lullabies	
2010	I'm in Europe 2010	
2009	Ideafixa Soundtrack	
2009	Nebraskapism	
2008	The House Always Wins	
2008	Fritz Turns 32	
2008	Pop No. 1	
2005	Winterhits Three	
2003	Winterhits Two	
2001	Winterhits One	

=== Miscellaneous Singles & Remixes ===
Year	Title	Notes
2026	Trans-Pennine Express	Cover of Kraftwerk – Trans-Europe Express
2013	Pet Shop Boys – Vocal (Fritz von Runte Redesign)	
2010	Gina Cutillo – Remember You (Fritz von Runte Redesign)	
2007	The KLF – Cicciolina in the White Room	As Doc Fritz
2005	808 State – Cübik (The 100th remix)	As Doc Fritz
2004	808 State – Let Yusuf Go (Doc Fritz Kat mix)	As Doc Fritz
2004	808 State vs NewOrder >>> Confusion (The Conflict mix)	As Doc Fritz
2001	808 State – Bond (A Doubtful mix)	As BrainSaver
