= Pomona (folksong) =

Folksong from Manchester, England

External audio
- Medley of a song called "Fancy, The Pride of The Home and The Way Down to Pomona" by Celinda Twitchell Olson

"Pomona" is a folksong originating from Manchester. It has many similarities with a song called Lamorna, which is popular in Cornwall.

"Pomona" refers to the Pomona Gardens (named after the Roman goddess Pomona) which were in Cornbrook, Hulme; the site was later used to build Pomona Docks.

== Lyrics ==
Down to Pomona

Now I'm going to sing,
A nice young lady fair,
I met some time ago,
At the corner of Albert Square.
She had a lovely jet black eye,
I thought I should like to own her,
For in a voice so sweet she asked of me
The way down to Pomona.

We met in Albert Square,
And I never shall forget,
Her eyes they shone like stars,
Thought the evening it was wet.
The hair it hung in curls.
Of this lovely little Donah,
As we drove that night in great delight,
Away down to Pomona.

My heart beat like a drum,
As I answered her with pride,
Yes, and if you have no objections,
I will take you there beside.
She blushed and answered yes,
The I fell in love all over,
For a cab I sent and off we went,
Away down to Pomona.

We'd scarce got in the cab,
When she asked me for my name,
I gave it to her then,
And asked of her the same.
When she lifted up the fall,
Which her face had covered over,
Upon my life she was my wife,
I was taking down to Pomona.

She said sir you know me now,
that we're not in the dark,
I said, yes love, before now,
But I thought I would have a lark,
Then for your larking you shall pay,
And forgetting your lovely Donah,
You shall have it to say, you had to pay,
For your wife into Pomona.
