= Community 2: A NewOrderOnline Tribute =

Studio album by Various Artists
- Released: October 31, 2006 (USA)
- Recorded: 2006
- Genres: Alternative, house
- Length: 72:21
- Label: Retroforward
- Producers: Michael Nguyen, Alejo Parella, Nicolas LeBlanc

Community 2 is a tribute album dedicated to the work of Ian Curtis, Gillian Gilbert, Peter Hook, Stephen Morris and Bernard Sumner of the bands New Order and Joy Division that was released in 2006.

It is the follower of Community: A NewOrderOnline Tribute, the project that was released in 2004.

== Project ==
The Community 2 project started on January 1, 2006, when the website NewOrderOnline.com announced that David Potts, one half of Monaco with New Order's Peter Hook, had decided to join the line-up as a guest artist covering the song "The Village" from New Order's 1983 album, Power, Corruption & Lies.

This time, the producers of the album decided to let the members pick ten songs off the album and let New Order themselves pick their favorite four songs. Peter Hook did the selection for the band and he chose "No Love Lost", "Blue Monday", "ICB" and "Ruined in a Day". "ICB" and "Ruined in a Day" being selected as well by the members of NewOrderOnline.com, the producers did their own selection as their best tracks, and that gave a spot to "Dream Attack", "Behind Closed Doors", "Doubts Even Here" and "1963" on the album.

The album is an enhanced CD, featuring the video of Potts' cover of "The Village", done by François-Marc Loze from France, who won the video competition. The album also features the winner of the remix competition, DJ Ionic, who remixed "The Village" and was selected by Potts himself. There was also a competition for the sleeve, and the liner notes were written by a long time Viking (New Order hardcore fans), Hugh "Shug" Sludden. Flash background music provided by Razed in a New Division of Agony (Logan Edwards).

The idea of this second edition of the project was to involve people that helped New Order in the years, so Howard Wakefield (of Saville Associates with Peter Saville) and Bill Holding (of Morph UK) gave their comments on the sleeves submitted in the sleeve competition, Michael Shamberg, who produced most of New Order's video gave his comments about the video competition, and Potts also gave his own comments on all aspects of the competition.

106 covers were submitted and only 15 made it to the album, with artists from 8 different countries this time around.

This time, all bands could only submit one cover, and only one cover per song could enter the final round. The final round had 64 covers in it.

== Track listing ==
1. David Potts - "The Village" – 4:08 - UK
2. Tin God - "Your Silent Face" – 4:41 - Brazil
3. Yokohama Crepuscule - "Run" – 2:41 - Japan
4. C Bentley - "ICB" – 5:09 - USA
5. Sunrise Before Dawn - "Ruined in a Day" – 3:52 - USA
6. 3V - "Blue Monday" – 3:49 - Finland
7. Phantom West - "Doubts Even Here" – 4:18 - USA
8. Labster - "Behind Closed Doors" – 4:26 - Greece
9. Glasnost - "Turn" – 4:25 - Argentina/Greece
10. Popvert - "Subculture" – 4:40 - USA
11. Serotonin T.O. - "No Love Lost" – 3:34 - Canada
12. Almanso - "New Dawn Fades" – 4:41 - Argentina
13. Tomihira - "Mr Disco" – 3:51 - USA
14. Kremlin - "Lonesome Tonight" – 4:45 - UK
15. Generalized - "1963" – 4:40 - Canada
16. O'ou - "Dream Attack" - 4:03 - Finland
17. David Potts - The Village (DJ Ionic Remix) - 4:28 - Finland
18. David Potts - The Village (Video by François-Marc Loze) - 4:15 - UK
