= Needle Bed =

Studio album by John Ralston
- Released: June 6, 2006 (U.S.)
- Recorded: 2005
- Genre: Acoustic rock, alternative rock
- Label: Vagrant Records
- Producer: Michael Seaman

Professional ratings
Review scores
Source	Rating
Allmusic	4/5 stars

Needle Bed is the first studio album recorded by John Ralston. It was released on June 6, 2006 on Vagrant Records. It was initially released privately and later re-released on the Vagrant label. A music video was shot for the promotional single, "Gone Gone Gone". Ralston toured with Dashboard Confessional in support of the record.

== Track listing ==
1. "No Catcher in the Rye" (1:21)
2. "It's Not Your Fault" (2:49)
3. "Hang a Sign" (3:16)
4. "When We Are Cats" (2:23)
5. "I Believe In Ghosts" (2:33)
6. "No One Said It Was Easy" (3:03)
7. "Gone Gone Gone" (3:51)
8. "Time for Me to Ruin Everything" (3:17)
9. "Keep Me" (2:07)
10. "Avalanche" (3:14)
11. "Our Favorite Record Skips" (3:31)
