= Rabbit in the Moon =

American electronic music group

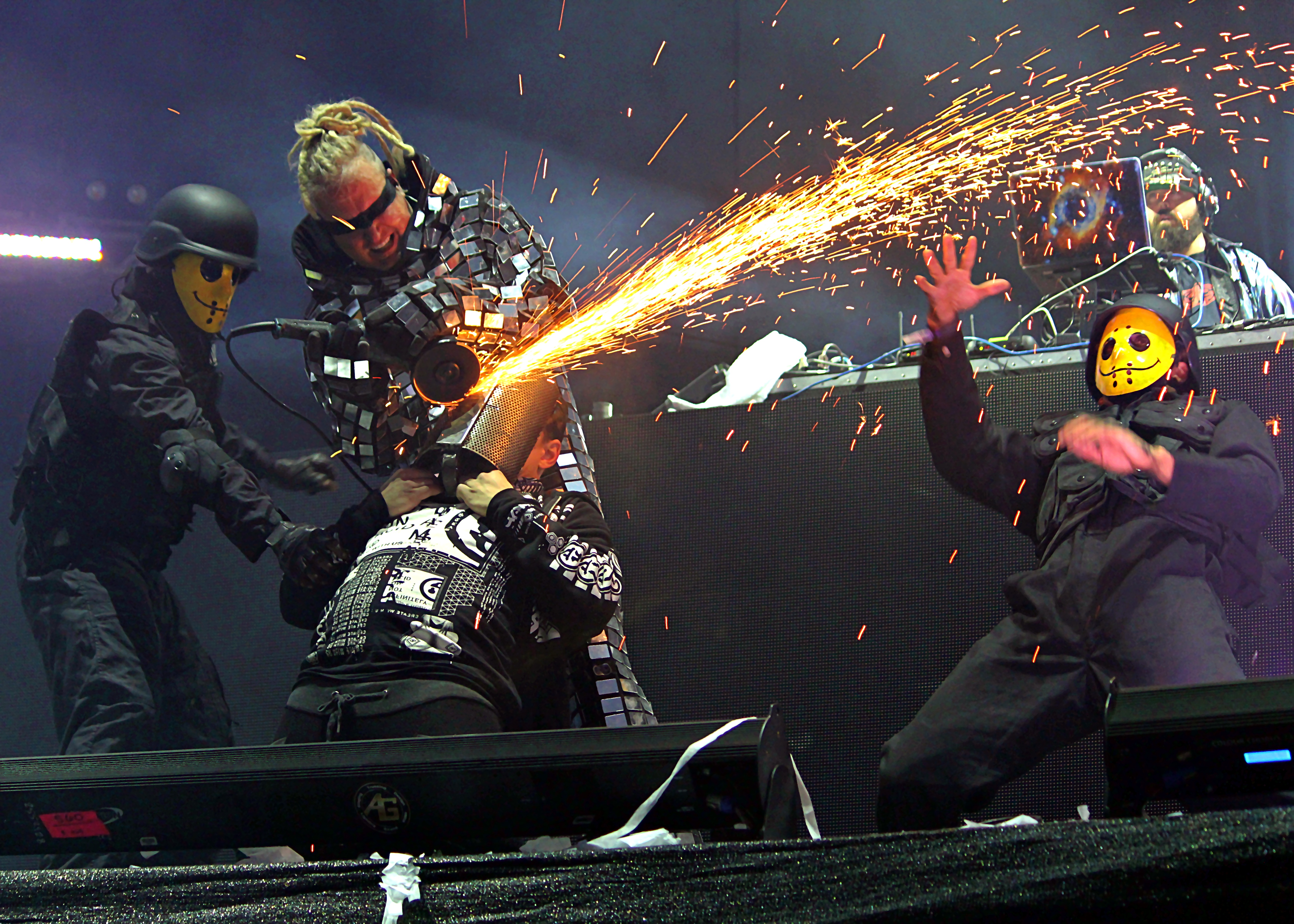
- Rabbit in the Moon performing in 2017

Background information
- Origin: Tampa, Florida, U.S.
- Genres: Electronic; house; breakbeat; drum and bass
- Years active: 1991–present
- Labels: Hallucination Recordings; Southbeat
- Members: David Christophere; Bunny
- Past members: DJ Monk
- Website: rabbitinthemoon.com

Rabbit in the Moon is an American electronic music group from Tampa, Florida that formed in 1991. Their style draws from psychedelic trance, house music and breakbeat, along with other diverse influences. They were among the first to mix theatrical stage performance with rave music.

== History ==
Formed in 1992 in Tampa, Florida, the group consisted of performer/singer Bunny and producer David Christophere.

After several singles released on Monk and David Christophere's Hallucination Recordings label under the name Anarch-E, their first success as producers came in 1993 with the release of the "Phases of an Out of Body Experience" single on Hardkiss Records. As remixers, Rabbit in the Moon has reworked songs by artists such as Garbage ("Queer" and "Milk"), Tori Amos ("Precious Things"), Sarah McLachlan ("Fear", "Possession"), Orbital ("Are We Here?"), Smashing Pumpkins ("The End Is the Beginning Is the End"), Goldie ("Inner City Life"), White Zombie ("Blood, Milk and Sky") and Delerium ("Euphoria").

Rabbit in the Moon collaborated with Humate and in 1994 they released the Hemispheres E.P.

Throughout their career, Rabbit in the Moon toured extensively in the United States playing shows at venues and raves.

In 1999, Rabbit in the Moon performed in the first Ultra Music Festival.

The Rabbit in the Moon Remixes Volume 2 CD came with a liner note stating that there was a new album to be released in summer of 2001. The album never materialized. Because of Monk's departure, questions were raised as to whether the group was breaking up, but this was not the case.

=== DJ Monk leaves ===
DJ Monk left the group in 2002. A new song called "Time Bomb" surfaced in 2003, with David Christophere and Bunny as the only producers on the track.

In 2005, they made the song "Came and Conkered", inspired by and featured in the soundtrack of the 2005 video game Conker: Live & Reloaded. They were asked by Nile Rodgers to create music for the Xbox remake of the game.

Early in 2007, a countdown to a new album appeared on the band's MySpace page, putting the release date in April 2007. The album was ultimately released on July 10, 2007. It features two discs: one, a collection of past singles and newer material in audio CD format; the other, a collection of music videos and live performances from various festivals and concerts in DVD format. The record is called "Decade", and was released on Contagious Musiq / Southbeat Records.

In 2008, on the second night of the Annual World DJ Festival in Seoul, South Korea, frontman Bunny was injured when a glass bottle thrown by someone in the crowd hit his left eye, lacerating his retina, lens, and skin, and severely damaging his vision. Friends and fans throughout the electronic dance music community rallied to raise money to help him pay for his medical expenses.

As of 2010, Rabbit in the Moon announced on their MySpace page that they were working on a new double album.

On March 27, 2010, Rabbit in the Moon performed at the Ultra Music Festival in Miami. David Christophere was not seen at this show, fueling rumors he left the band and of an imminent band break up.

Bunny has been performing in several countries under the title BUNNY or Bunny Live.

David Christophere produces music and DJ from his home base in Los Angeles.

=== Reunion ===
On August 31, 2013, the group played Firestone Live in Orlando, FL.

On December 16, 2015, Ultra Music Festival in Miami announced the appearance of Rabbit in the Moon on their lineup of 2016 edition . The group performed at Electric Daisy Carnival in Orlando in November, 2016.

The group played at Ultra Music Festival Miami 2017 and 2018. As well as Ultra Korea, Insomniac Countdown, Freaknight Seattle, and the great salt air Utah Das Energi festival.

== Selected discography ==
Original productions and singles:

Year	Title	Detail
1993	Out of Body Experience/Freak to the Beat	Hallucination 12"
1994	Phases of an Out Of Body Experience	Hardkiss 12"
1995	Untitled/The EP that Never Was	Limited Edition Hallucination 12"
1997	Deeper	Limited Edition Hallucination 12"
1998	Rabbit in the Moon Remixes Volume 1	Hallucination 3x12" and CD
1998	Waiting for the Night	Appears on 'For the Masses' Depeche Mode Tribute
1999	Floori.d.a	Hallucination 2x12" and CD Maxi
1999	Rabbit in the Moon Remixes Volume 2	Hallucination 3x12" and CD
2002	9ine Eleven Dub	White Label
2002	Time Bomb	White Label
2007	Decade	Southbeat Records
2009	Blue Monday on Ceremony – A New Order Tribute	24 Hour Service Station
2016	Pheet Original release	
2017	Let's Dance Remake release with live video	
2017	Seven Loves Electro EP	Insomniac Music / Thumper Music; Limited Release vinyl 12" and Digital
2018	Vibration EP	

=== Remixes ===
Artist	Track	RITM's Mix	Label
Astral Pilot	Electro Acupuncture	Transcutaneous Electrical Nerve Stimulation	Harthouse
Aquarhythms	Heart Sequence	Moveable Feast Mix	Astralwerks
Banco de Gaia	Drunk as a Monk	Brass Monkey mix	Mammoth Records
BT & Tori Amos	Blue Skies	Fathomless mix	Kinetic Records/Perfecto Records
Cosmic Baby	Cosmic Greets Florida	greets berlin & 7 am pacific rmxs	Logic
Delerium	Euphoria (firefly)	Divine Gothic Disco Mix & Dub	Netwerk
Garbage	Queer	Heftybag mix and F.T.F.O.I. mix	Geffen Records/Almo Sounds
Garbage	Stupid Girl		Geffen/Almo Sounds
Garbage	Milk	Got It, Butchered Vegas and Udder mixes	Geffen/Almo
God Within	The Phoenix	river & rain rmx	Hardkiss
Goldie	Inner City Life		London/FFRR Records
Healy & Amos	Argentina	Helium mix	Positiva Records
DJ Keoki	Caterpillar	disco 2001 mix	Moonshine Music
Love and Rockets	R.I.P. 20C	D.eath M.etal T.echno mix & R.I.P.ella	Red Ant
Nightripper	Tone Exploitation	exploitation rmx	ESP
Orbital	Are We Here	Oral Mix & Laconic Dub	London/FFRR
Planet Perfecto (Paul Oakenfold)	Bullet In The Gun 2000	Bloodhound Gangbangers & Spooky Red Ribbon Mixes	Perfecto
Planet Soul	Set U Free	Moon Spirits dub	Strictly Rhythm
Rabbit in the Moon/Humate	East	southern stimulation	Superstition/RisingHigh
Sarah McLachlan	Possession, Fear & Fear of Possession		Arista Records
Smashing Pumpkins	The End Is the Beginning Is the End	Melancholy & The Infinite Madness Mix & Dub	Warner Bros.
The Stone Roses vs. RITM	Fool's Gold	Message To The Majors & Straight Beat Mixes	Jive Electro
The Stone Roses vs. RITM	I Wanna Be adored	Acid Hacienda V2.1, Sex EFX & 909, For The Love Of Acid Mix & LunaSol's Acid Hacienda	Jive Electro
TDF (feat. Eric Clapton)	Ripstop	Creamy Funkshunal mix	Reprise
Velocity	Lust	Desirable mix	Superstition
White Zombie	More Human Than Human		Geffen
White Zombie	Blood, Milk & Sky	Subterranean Mix	Geffen
