= Community: A NewOrderOnline Tribute =

Studio album by Various Artists
- Released: June 7, 2004 (USA)
- Recorded: 2003–2004
- Genres: Alternative, house
- Length: 72:17
- Label: Retroforward
- Producers: Michael Nguyen, Alejo Parella, Nicolas LeBlanc

Professional ratings
Review scores
Source	Rating
NewOrderOnline	(5/5)
Amazon.com	(?)

Community is a tribute album dedicated to the work of Ian Curtis, Gillian Gilbert, Peter Hook, Stephen Morris and Bernard Sumner of the bands New Order and Joy Division that was released in 2004.

== The Project ==
The Community project started when Alejo Parella submitted his own covers of New Order and Electronic and it caught the eyes of producer Michael Nguyen. It ended up in a big contest opened to artists from all over the world. More than 60 covers were submitted, and people from all over the world were allowed to vote to pick their favorite 15 tracks.

The final track listing is the songs that got the most votes, an unusual approach.

All artists were limited to 3 covers, a first round of voting was to determine which one of their cover would make it to the final round. In case the song was submitted by two or more artists, there were elimination rounds to pick the winner of those songs, but then the eliminated artist's second most popular song moved to the final round.

The final round saw about 40 songs, done by pure fans of New Order because it was done via New Order's semi-official website.

== Track listing ==
1. kREMLIN - "Sooner Than You Think" – 3:47 - UK
2. Captain Black - "Procession" – 4:28 - UK
3. Evaluna - Thieves Like Us – 3:51 - USA
4. Labster - "Face Up" – 4:58 - Greece
5. Project Wintermute - "Transmission" – 3:55 - Australia
6. Unfaith - "True Faith" – 4:10 - Canada
7. Cloudless - "Some Distant Memory" – 4:59 - USA
8. SlightlyNarrow SoundSystem - "Heart and Soul" – 3:10 - UK
9. C Bentley - "In a Lonely Place" – 4:21 - USA
10. Dance Upon Nothing - "Bizarre Love Triangle" – 4:28 - USA
11. International - "The Perfect Kiss" – 4:20 - Brazil
12. Flight - "Dreams Never End" – 3:40 - UK
13. Spiral of Silence - "Dead Souls" – 3:44 - Belgium
14. La Fin De Tout - "586" – 4:52 - France
15. The Minus One - "We All Stand" – 4:44 - Greece
16. almanso - "Angel Dust" – 4:11 - Argentina
17. Digital (a.k.a. Known Pleasures) - "Love Vigilantes" (Hidden Track) – 4:31 - UK

== CommunityEP ==
CommunityEP: A NewOrderOnline Tribute

EP by Various Artists
- Released: June 7, 2004 (USA)
- Recorded: 2003-2004
- Genres: Alternative, House
- Length: 31:07
- Label: Retroforward
- Producers: Michael F. Nguyen, Alejo Parella, Nicolas LeBlanc

Professional ratings
Review scores
Source	Rating
NewOrderOnline	(5/5) link
Amazon.com	(not rated) link

Due to the high quality of the songs submitted, the producers of the album decided to release CommunityEP, a selection of their favorite songs that were not included on the album. The reason you might see similar artists is because they did submit more than one cover in the competition, but they were so good that the producers decided to release them anyway.

One track is part is also the winner of a remix competition that was held where the members had to vote between 10+ remixes done by several artists.

== Track listing ==
1. almanso - Ceremony – 4:07 - Argentina
2. The Minus One - Dreams Never End – 3:17 - Greece
3. Manumatic - Love Less – 3:09 - USA
4. C Bentley - Temptation – 5:19 - USA
5. almanso - Angel Dust (Project Wintermute Evil Dust Machine Remix) – 5:18 - Argentina
6. Digital - Leave Me Alone – 5:00 - UK
7. Nemesis - Crystal – 4:37 - Argentina/Greece

== Follow Up ==
In 2005, NewOrderOnline.com announced the project of Community 2, One year later, on October 31, 2006, Community 2: A NewOrderOnline Tribute has been released.
