= Kites with Lights =

American musician

Kites With Lights
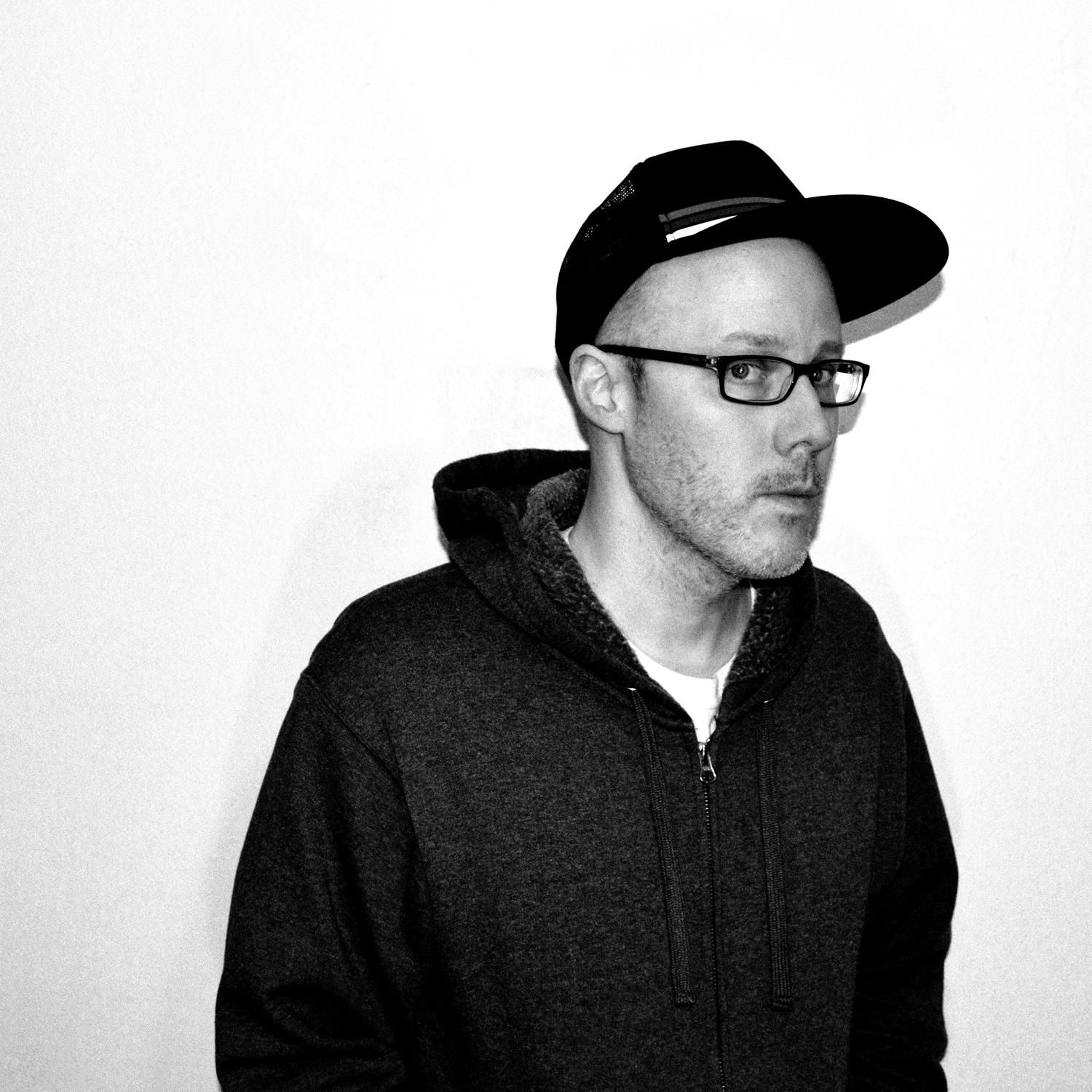
- Kites With Lights in March 2014

Background information
- Origin: Pittsburgh, Pennsylvania, US
- Genres: Synth-pop; electropop; indie pop
- Years active: 2005–present
- Labels: 24 Hour Service Station; Electric Fantastic Sound
- Website: kiteswithlights.com

Jonah Timothy Cordy, known professionally as Kites With Lights, is an American musician. He is originally from Pittsburgh, Pennsylvania, and is based in Athens, Georgia. Since 2005, a number of EPs, singles, and remixes have been released. His debut studio album Cosmonauts was released in 2011 on 24 Hour Service Station.

== History ==
Kites With Lights began in 2005 when two self-produced EPs received radio play in the United States, United Kingdom and Sweden. In 2007 the single "It's On" was released on Swedish label Electric Fantastic Sound. In 2009 "The Weight of Your Heart" and "I Wish Every Other Day Was Christmas" were released on the Tampa-based record label 24 Hour Service Station. This led to Cordy contributing a remix of the song "A Force of Nature" by label mate Pocket and featuring Mark Burgess of the Chameleons U.K. This single was part of a series including Steve Kilbey of The Church, Tanya Donelly and Robyn Hitchcock. In 2010, Jonah contributed a cover of the New Order song "Dream Attack" to the tribute album Ceremony - A New Order Tribute, endorsed by Peter Hook of New Order, which benefited The Salford Foundation Trust. Cordy also produced a remix of "Ceremony" performed by sister act Yes But No which was included in the double album. In August 2011, his first full-length album, the eight song Cosmonauts was released worldwide, followed by On the Edges in 2014 and The Movies in 2018.

== Discography ==
=== Albums and EPs ===
- 2009: The Weight Of Your Heart EP (24 Hour Service Station)
- 2010: Brand New EP (24 Hour Service Station)
- 2011: Cosmonauts (24 Hour Service Station)
- 2014: On The Edges (24 Hour Service Station)
- 2018: The Movies (Independent)

=== Singles ===
- 2007: "It's On" (Electric Fantastic Sound)
- 2009: "I Wish Every Other Day Was Christmas" (24 Hour Service Station)
- 2010: "Dream Attack" on Ceremony - A New Order Tribute (24 Hour Service Station)
- 2012: "Night Colours" (24 Hour Service Station)
- 2013: "Glowing" (24 Hour Service Station)
- 2013: "Holding Hearts" (24 Hour Service Station)

=== Remixes & production ===
- 2010: "A Force of Nature" (Kites With Lights Remix) by Pocket featuring Mark Burgess (24 Hour Service Station EP)
- 2010: "Ceremony" (Kites With Lights Remix) by Yes but No (24 Hour Service Station)
- 2011: "Seeker Circuit" (Kites With Lights Remix) by Return to Mono (Audio Villain LP)
