= Kingsbury (band) =

US musical group

- Origin: Orlando, Florida, United States
- Genres: Psychedelic rock, indie rock
- Years active: 2003–present
- Members: Bruce Reed; Mark Freeman; T.J. Burke; Samantha Christine
- Past members: Nick Anderson; Riley Anderson; Alexis Hamlin-Vogler

Kingsbury is an Orlando-based psychedelic indie rock band, signed to Post Records.

== History ==
Kingsbury formed in 2003 in Orlando, Florida when songwriter Bruce Reed met bass player Mark Freeman and drummer T.J. Burke. Reed had recorded a number of songs on a four-track machine. In December 2003, guitarist Nick Sanders and keyboardist Riley Anderson also joined the band.

In early 2004, the band released its first record, a 4-song EP called This Place is Coming Down. The band started playing shows in and around Central Florida, then in other parts of Florida. This Place is Coming Down received positive reviews from several media outlets. Lost at Sea Magazine said “This Place is Coming Down not only introduces a band with real great potential, but one that is already writing mature interesting music.” Delusions of Adequacy said "This Place is Coming Down is a strong achievement from a talented group of musicians looking to break their way into the often tumultuous indie-rock scene."

In August 2004, Kingsbury began its first tour, focusing on the Southeastern United States.

In 2005, Kingsbury released its second EP, The Open Sea.

Kingsbury completed two tours in the summer of 2005 in support of The Great Compromise, the first tour focusing on the Southeast U.S. and the second covering the Northeast and west to Chicago.

After the second tour in 2005, Nick Sanders left the band, Riley Anderson was fired, and the remaining trio began writing a full-length album, which they recorded mostly by themselves at their home studio, Sugarwood Studios in Winter Park, Florida. Their friend Wes Jones of Apollo Quartet assisted with extra guitar tracks and other instrumentation. The album, entitled The Great Compromise, was completed in the fall of 2006 and released in January 2007. After the initial recording was complete, Samantha Christine (guitar) and Alexis Hamlin-Vogler (keyboards vocals) joined the band.

The Great Compromise featured much more use of electronic equipment such as drum machines and sequencers. Amplifier Magazine said that the record "encourages dark introspection while discouraging the puerile moping that's too often present in contemporary rock and folk music." and REAX Magazine called the album "mesmerizing." The band toured throughout Florida and the Eastern U.S. heavily in support of The Great Compromise.

Hamlin-Vogler subsequently left the band to pursue a career in cosmetology. The band has been a four-piece since.

In 2008, the band wrote and recorded a six-song EP entitled Lie to Me. Two of the tracks on this EP were ambient electronic instrumental tracks. The EP was released digitally for free via download on the band's website.

As of 2009, the band was self-promoting the new EP and preparing for a number of shows to support the recording. Kingsbury also recorded two cover songs to be featured on a New Order tribute compilation CD.

== Style ==
On the release of The Open Sea, the Orlando Weekly described Kingsbury as "buried in a resonant cavern full of downcast melodies and spacious arrangements, with a slightly trippy patina mixing up the metaphor". The review added that they were in the "canon of Orlando-bands-who-shouldn't-be-from Orlando". Commenting on the sound, the paper commented that “the linchpin in the group's sound is the interplay between the piano (which drives most of the melodies) and the guitars (which provide most of the atmosphere).”

== Band members ==
=== Current members ===
- Bruce Reed – Vocals, Guitar (2003–present)
- Mark Freeman – Bass (2003–present)
- T.J. Burke – Drums and programming (2003–present)
- Samantha Christine – Guitars (2006–present)

=== Former members ===
- Nick Anderson – Guitars (2003–2005)
- Riley Anderson – Keyboards (2003–2005)
- Alexis Hamlin-Vogler – Keyboards, Vocals (2006–2007)

== Discography ==
=== Full-length albums ===
- The Great Compromise (2007)

=== EPs ===
- This Place is Coming Down (2004)
- The Open Sea (2005)
- Lie to Me (2008)
