= 24 Hour Service Station =

American independent record label

- Founded: 1993
- Founder: Marshall Dickson
- Distributors: MVD, IODA (The Orchard), 24 Hour Distribution
- Genre: Various
- Country of origin: U.S.
- Location: Tampa, Florida
- Official website: 24hourservicestation.com

24 Hour Service Station is an American independent record label founded by Marshall Dickson in Tampa, Florida, in 1993. Among its releases are Ceremony - A New Order Tribute, a charity album, and albums from artists such as Freebass, Peter Hook and The Light, The Beauvilles, John Ralston, and punk band Pink Lincolns. It also operates the division 24 Hour Distribution, a global media distribution network which is partnered with entities such as the Independent Online Distribution Alliance and The Orchard.

== History ==
=== Founding ===
24 Hour Service Station's first signing in 1994 was Rosewater Elizabeth, an up-and-coming ethereal group in the Tampa Bay area music scene. The label then went on to release records by Shoemaker Levy 9, Questionface, and a tribute album to The Smiths entitled Godfathers of Change. In 1997, Dickson put the label "underground" to take a different path in the music business, starting a sales and marketing career with Sony Music.

=== Re-launch ===
In 2007, Dickson re-launched the record label while also maintaining the helm as General Manager of Reax Music Magazine. The label then released the Car Bomb Driver album Evacuate, and by 2008, 24 Hour Service Station had put out a total of 17 releases and signed 13 bands including History, Win Win Winter, and The Beauvilles. Songwriter and guitarist John Wesley, who had released two albums on 24 Hour in the mid-1990s and another during the hiatus (The Emperor Falls), continued releasing music on the label during the restart. By 2009 artists such as electronics musician Pocket and Kites With Lights had signed to the label, with The Fantastiques, a band from Minsk, Belarus, following suit.

=== Ceremony - A New Order Tribute (2009) ===
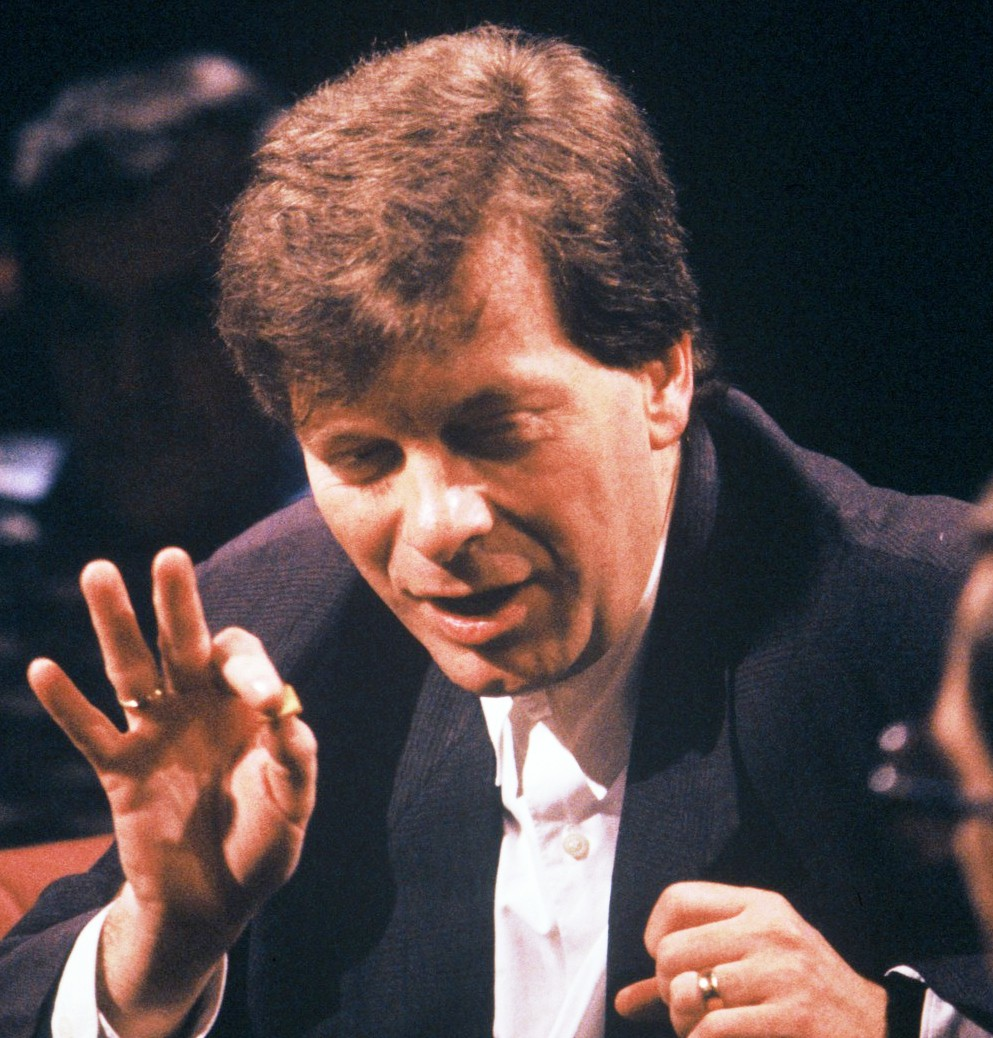
The album was dedicated to Tony Wilson, with all proceeds going to his charity

Ceremony – A New Order Tribute is a 2009 compilation album of New Order covers by independent acts from the United States and Europe, compiled into a double CD Digi-pack and two additional digital albums. Produced by Sonshine Ward and Marshall Dickson, it was released in February 2010 by 24 Hour Service Station, with contributions from artists such as Peter Hook of Joy Division, Kites With Lights, and Rabbit in the Moon.

Allmusic reviewer William Ruhlmann gave the digital album 3.5/5 stars, and praised in particular the tracks that strayed in style from the original New Order compositions.

The album is dedicated to the founder of Factory Records and New Order producer Tony Wilson, who died in 2007 from cancer. Marshall Dickson was originally inspired by Wilson to start 24 Hour Service Station. The album benefits the Salford Foundation Trust's Tony Wilson Award. Artists donated time and recordings to support the charity, which "assists young people who demonstrate a special talent or ambition in the arts or creative skills".

=== Recent years ===
In 2010 Freebass released the first of several albums on the label. The group includes Peter Hook of Joy Division & New Order, Gary "Mani" Mounfield of The Stone Roses & Primal Scream, Andy Rourke of The Smiths, Phil Murphy of Man Ray, Paul Kehoe of Monaco and Gary Briggs of Haven. Peter Hook also played in two other bands that signed to the label; Man Ray with Phil Murphy, and Peter Hook and The Light. Fritz von Runte, a DJ and producer based in England, does frequently work with the label.

Most of the bands signing to the label remained from the Tampa, Florida region, including The Beauvilles, Non-aggression Pact, singer-songwriter John Ralston, and punk rock band Pink Lincolns. Yes But No, a duo of young sisters that contributed to the Ceremony compilation, are also from the area.

== 24 Hour Distribution ==
24 Hour Distribution is a global media distribution network, delivering content to over 250 international digital music outlets via a partnership with Independent Online Distribution Alliance and The Orchard. Physical products are available to retailers in the United States and Canada and independent music stores including the coalitions A.I.M.S., C.I.M.S. & Music Monitor Network, and one-stop fulfillment. 24 Hour Distribution exports physical goods to vendors in Europe, Asia, South America, Australia, and New Zealand.

Among its distribution clients are Peter Hook's label Hacienda Records UK, and In a Circle Records, which handle Brooklyn Rider, Yo-Yo Ma, and The Knights.

== Label artists ==
The following artists and bands have released music on the label, as of October 2013:

- Blue Eyes
- The Beauvilles
- Car Bomb Driver
- Daddy Lion
- John Ralston
- Fritz von Runte
- Tommy Simms
- Noah Kussack
- Kites With Lights
- The Fantastiques
- Win Win Winter
- History
- John Wesley
- Questionface
- Rosewater Elizabeth
- Man Ray - Peter Hook & Phil Murphy
- Mosley
- Non-aggression Pact
- Underwater
- Simon Said...
- Skinnys 21
- Shoemaker Levy 9
- X.O.X.O.
- Freebass
  - Peter Hook of Joy Division & New Order, Gary "Mani" Mounfield of The Stone Roses & Primal Scream, Andy Rourke of The Smiths, Phil Murphy of Man Ray, Paul Kehoe of Monaco and Gary Briggs of Haven
- Pocket
  - Richard Jankovich collaborating with Robyn Hitchcock, Steve Kilbey of The Church, Yuki Chikudate of Asobi Seksu, Craig Wedren of Shudder to Think, Dave Smalley, Mark Burgess of The Chameleons UK, Danny Seim of Menomena, Tanya Donelly
- Yung Hod

=== Gallery ===
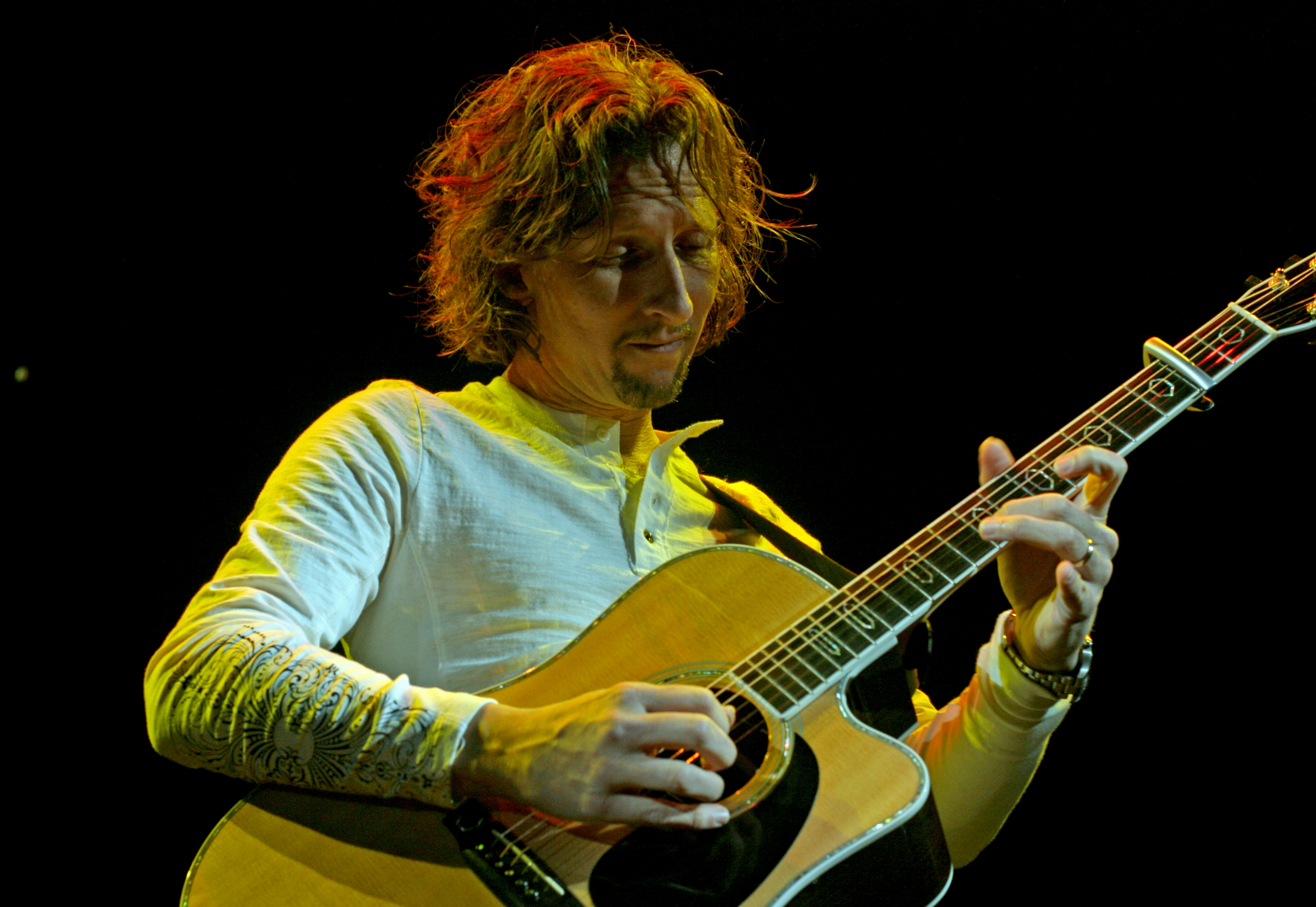
John Wesley in 2009, from Tampa, Florida

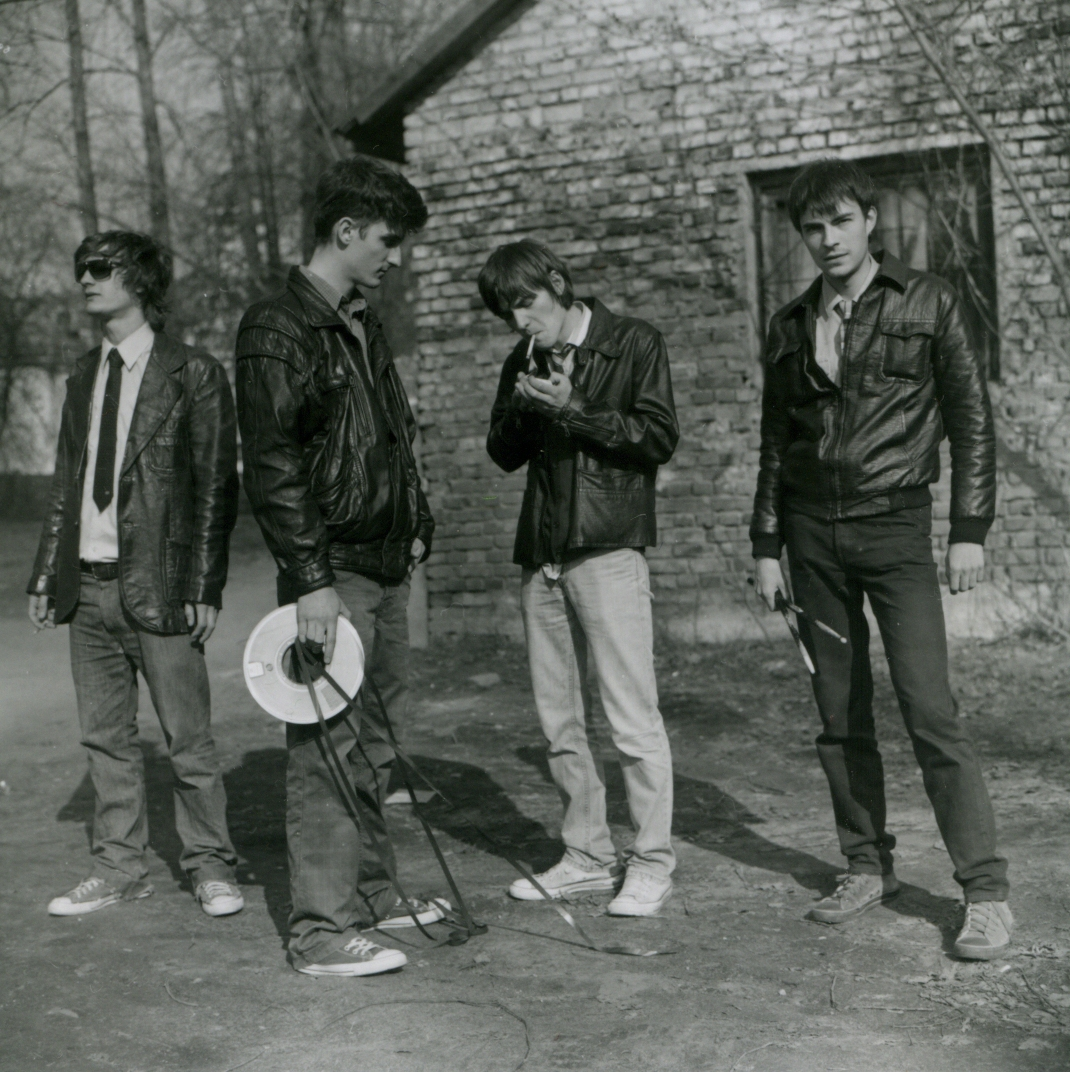
The Fantastiques from Minsk, Belarus

== Discography ==
SKU	Title	Artist	Year
audio.01	Faint	Rosewater Elizabeth	1994
audio.02	It Swallows Me Whole	Rosewater Elizabeth	1995
audio.03	Hallucinogenic Toreador	Shoemaker Levy 9	1996
audio.04	Le Petit Morte	Rosewater Elizabeth	1995
audio.05	Witch Nam	Rosewater Elizabeth	1996
audio.06	Cynthia	Shoemaker Levy 9	1996
audio.07	Godfathers of Change	Tribute to the Smiths	1997
audio.08	Limbo	Questionface	1996
audio.09	Thread Easy Reel	Mosley	1996
audio.10	Peace... An End	Blue Eyes	2008
audio.11	Tart Chopping Hits	Simon Said...	1997
	Hiatus		1999- 2007
audio.12	Spent Casings : Gesticulate Reloaded	Non-aggression Pact	2009
audio.14	Evacuate	Car Bomb Driver	2009
audio.15	Ghosts in the City	History	2008
audio.16	A Brief History Of...	Win Win Winter	2008
audio.18	Surrender [Expanded Edition]	Revere	2008
audio.19	Christmas in a Thomas Kinkade Town	Mike verzi feat. Michelle ivey	2008
audio.20	Whipering Sin	The Beauvilles	2009
audio.21	Skinnys 21	Skinnys 21	2008
audio.28	Under The Red And White Sky	John Wesley	1994
audio.29	The Closing of the Pale Blue Eyes	John Wesley	1995
audio.30	The Emperor Falls	John Wesley	1998
audio.31	Chasing Monsters	John Wesley	2002
audio.32	Shiver	John Wesley	2005
audio.33	Oxford	John Wesley	2009
audio.34	C'est La Vie	XOXO	2009
audio.35	The Weight of Your Heart	Kites With Lights	2009
audio.36	Surround Him With Love	Pocket featuring Robyn Hitchcock	2009
audio.37	SAMPO	Pocket featuring Yuki Chikudate	2009
audio.38	Hear in Noiseville	Pocket featuring Steve Kilbey	2009
audio.39	Singles - Volume 1	Pocket	2009
audio.40	Ceremony - A New Order Tribute	Various	2010
audio.41	Beautiful Gray	Pocket featuring Dave Smalley	2009
audio.42	Someone To Run Away From	Pocket featuring Craig Wedren	2009
audio.43	My 1st Car	The Fantastiques	2009
audio.44	I Wish Every Other Day Was Christmas	Kites With Lights	2009
audio.45	A Force of Nature	Pocket featuring Mark Burgess	2010
audio.46	summer 88	Man Ray	2010
audio.47	Backwards From Ten	Pocket featuring Danny Seim	2010
audio.48	Jars of Fireflies	Pocket featuring Tanya Donelly	2010
audio.49	Ceremony - The Digital Album	Ceremony - A New Order Tribute	2010
audio.50	Ceremony - EP	Yes But No	2010
audio.51	Two Worlds Collide - ep, single track mix, live tomorrow you go down	Freebass	2010
audio.52	Ceremony - Twelve Versions of Ceremony	various	2010
audio.53	It's a Beautiful Life	Freebass	2010
audio.54	Ceremony - A New Order Tribute - Beatport exclusive	Various	2010
audio.55	The Archers Bowed And Broke Their Bows	Tommy Simms / Win Win Winter	2011
audio.56	Five Single eps	Pocket	2009
audio.57	s/t Ep	Daddy Lion	2010
audio.58	A Momentary Lapse in the Key of W	Noah Kussack / XOXO	2010
audio.59	Brand New	Kites With Lights	2010
audio.60	Instrumental EP	Freebass	2010
audio.61	You Don't Know This About Me - The Arthur Baker remixes	Freebass	2010
audio.62	Hand in Glove - The Smiths Tribute	Various	2011
audio.63	Freebass Redesigns	Fritz von Runte	2010
audio.64	Tokyo Joe	Man Ray	2010
audio.65	Live at the L'olympia	John Wesley	2011
audio.66	Cosmonauts	Kites With Lights	2011
audio.67	1102 / 2011 EP	Peter Hook And The Light	2011
audio.68	YINZ - the live album	Pink Lincolns	2012
audio.69	Redesigns	Fritz von Runte	2012
audio.70	Jesus Christ B/W A Marigny Xmas	John Ralston	2010
audio.71	Night Colours	Kites With Lights	2012
audio.72	Habitat	Daddy Lion	2012
audio.73	EP EP	PLS PLS	2012
audio.74	Ackbar	Steel Fox	2012
audio.75	Holding Hearts	Kites With Lights	2013
audio.76	LP LP	PLS PLS	2013

== See also ==
- Reax Music Magazine
- Lists of record labels
