= John Ralston (musician) =

American singer-songwriter

- Origin: Lake Worth, Florida, U.S.
- Genres: Indie rock, acoustic rock
- Occupation: Musician
- Instrument(s): Guitars, vocals
- Years active: 2005–present
- Labels: Unsigned, 24 Hour Service Station
- Formerly of: Dashboard Confessional

John Ralston is an American musician and singer-songwriter. He is originally from Lake Worth, Florida and is a member of the band Legends of Rodeo (formerly called Recess Theory), which is currently on an indefinite hiatus. He has released two full-length albums, two EPs, and released his third solo record, Shadows of the Summertime in 2011. A 7"single of "Jesus Christ" b/w "A Marigny Christmas" was released in early 2011.

== Discography ==
- Needle Bed (Vagrant Records, 2006)
- Sorry Vampire (Vagrant Records, 2007)
- Shadows of the Summertime (Self-released, 2011)

== EPs ==
- When We Are Cats (Self Released, 2005)
- Box of Chocolates (Vagrant Records, 2006)
- Fragile (Vagrant Records, 2007)
- White Spiders (Self Released, 2008)
- Jesus Christ (24 Hour Service Station, 2011)
- Wildlands (Self Released, 2011)
- Verbal Tan (Self Released, 2017)

== Production credits ==
- "Something More" by Matt Minchew (2011)
- "The Sun Clouded Over" by Keith Michaud (2008)

== Non-album tracks ==
- "Everything to Be Afraid Of" – played live
- "Blacklisted (Demo)" – released on his MySpace page, no longer available
- "Rivermountainview" – released on his Myspace
- "Sea Garden Blue" – released on Fresh Ink sampler

== Films ==
The song "Gone, Gone, Gone" is featured in the 2008 indie film The Other Side of the Tracks.
