= Reax Music Magazine =

- Categories: Music magazine
- Publisher: Joel Cook
- Founder: Joel Cook
- Founded: 2006
- Country: United States
- Based in: Tampa, Florida
- Language: English
- Website: reaxmusic.com

Reax Music Magazine is a Tampa-based music and art magazine first published by Joel Cook in 2006. Reax's distribution reaches nearly twenty markets throughout the state of Florida, including Tampa, Orlando, Jacksonville, Tallahassee, Miami, and Pensacola. Recurring columns in the magazine cover music and product reviews, local events, and personal interest columns like "Dear Gloffy" and "Dancing About Architecture".

In the spring of 2008 the publication became nationally distributed through a network of various independent music, college oriented and entertainment outlets.

Marshall Dickson of 24 Hour Service Station in Tampa was serving as general manager by 2007.

== Staff ==
- Joel Cook - founder, publisher
- Marshall Dickson - general manager
