= Post Records =

- Origin: Orlando, Florida, U.S.
- Genres: Pop, Americana, metal, indie rock, folk
- Years active: Early 1960s–present

Post Records is an American independent record label, which was formed by Buzz Curtis in the early 1960s. It is located in Philadelphia, Pennsylvania. Curtis pressed many such compilations in the 1960s and 1970s. Most would contain one or two localized hits. Both volumes of CKLW Solid Gold were American LPs, pressed by Post Records.

== Discography ==
- POST-10 - WCFL Double Gold (2xLP)
- POST-22 - WIBG 22 Big Goldens
- POST-30 - WIBG Presents 30 Big Goldens
- POST-68 - WRKO 30 Now Goldens
- POST-316- KLEO 22 Heavy Goldens
- POST-560 - WQAM The Roarin' 30 Album
- POST-610 - KILT Double Gold
- POST-747 - WRKO 30 Now Goldens Vol.2
- POST-950 - WBBF 22 Golden Oldies
- POST 987 - WOR-FM 98.7 Double Golden 1968
- POST 1360 - WSAI Command Performance
- POST 7001 - WOR-FM 98.7 Solid Gold Double Album 1970
- POST-7102 - WIFE 22 Golden Classics
- POST-7103 - KOIL 22 Golden Classics
- POST-9660 - Bits Of Buzz And Patti Volume 1

The following were POST releases of Coed material. Although listed as stereo, they were re-channeled stereo even though the Coed recordings were in stereo.

- POST-1000 - The Duprees Sing, late-1960s
- POST-2000 - The Rivieras Sing, late-1960s
- POST-4000 - The Shangri-Las Sing, late-1960s
- POST-3000 - The Crests Sing, late-1960s
- POST-5000-C - Lee Andrews Sings
- POST-6000-C - The Beau Brummels Sing, late-1960s
- POST-7000 - Jerry Butler Sings, late-1960s
- POST-8000 - The Olympics Sing
- POST-9000 - Del Shannon Sings
- POST-11000 - The Duprees Sing, Volume 2, early-1970s

Produced by Buzz Curtis:

- POST-8 - CKLW - Solid Gold (2xLP)
- POST-7108 - CKLW Solid Gold, Vol. 2 (2xLP)
- 30 Now Goldens (2xLP, Comp) – Post Records — 1968
- WSAI Command Performance (2xLP, Comp) – Post Records — 1970
- 93/KHJ: "Sound Of The Sixties" (2xLP) – Pace Records — 1970
- The Duprees Sing (LP) – Post Records
- WIBG: 30 Big Goldens (2xLP, Comp) – Post Records
- POST-7108 – CKLW – Solid Gold (2xLP)
- KLIV Super 16 Hits (LP, Comp) – Post Records
