= The Beauvilles =

American indie rock band

the Beauvilles
- handout photo (March. 2010)

Background information
- Origin: Tampa, Florida, United States
- Genre: Indie rock
- Years active: 2003–2012
- Label: 24 Hour Service Station (2008–present)
- Past members: Shawn Kyle "Beauville"; Max Norton; Jason Dudney; C. Solomon Holmes; Randy McMillan; Chris Tolan; Cory Karish; John Barker
- Website: Official website

The Beauvilles were an American indie rock band based in Ybor City, Florida, United States. Their music includes overtones of Americana, British Invasion, and Vintage R&B along with more experimental musical elements and time signatures. Prominent members include principal songwriter Shawn Kyle "Beauville" (vocals, guitar), Max Norton (drums, percussion), and Jason Dudney (electric bass, piano, organ, vocals) As of 2012 the band has stated that it is on indefinite hiatus.

== Biography ==
The Beauvilles were founded by drummer C. Solomon Holmes and guitarist and vocalist Shawn Kyle in 2002 as a classic rock influenced garage band, later evolving into a group incorporating vintage 1970s aesthetics and early psychedelia into their sound and recordings. The group's recording debut, 2004's Singapore EP, was recorded at the encouragement of John Wesley, best known for his work with London based artists, Porcupine Tree.

The self-produced Singapore EP was an unexpected success for the group, garnering national media attention, and positive music trade reviews following its recognition by the National Academy of Recording Arts and Sciences or NARAS, as a runner up in the annual Independent GRAMMY Awards for the Southeastern United States, held in Miami, Florida. This recording opened doors for the group to perform at various music festivals such as SXSW in Austin, Texas, where the Beauvilles were spontaneously photographed for Rolling Stone and interviewed by Erik Olsen, then of the New York Times. The group went on to be featured on multiple compilations, tour yearly and release an album, Whispering Sin, and go through several line-up changes, with Kyle remaining the only original member, before officially disbanding in 2013.

Reviews of the group's early live shows focused on the group's unique vocal stylings, unpredictable inter-member volatility leading to on-stage brawls between band members, and the occasional destruction of their musical instruments on stage. Later lineups downplayed the group's earlier behavior, with the group becoming known in reviews for their musical ability as an example of a power trio with high energy performances and Wall of Sound treatment of their recorded and improvised material.

In 2008 the band signed a distribution deal with the label 24 Hour Service Station, home to various underground and fringe artists, for distribution of their upcoming full-length record in the United States via IDN and AEC.

The Beauvilles' first full-length studio record entitled Whispering Sin, which the group claimed to be an autobiographical document of the influences of constant travel, and the influential vices and scenery of the cities resided in this period, with the album cover art an iconic 1940s Toni Frissell photograph of a woman floating in a lake. The record was generally well received with airplay on college radio but failed to chart nationally.

In early 2009 the group was chosen as an "official" showcasing artist for the annual SXSW festival in Austin, Texas. Although the group hoped this to be a breakout moment, their headlining 6th street showcase at the Wave on Saturday March 21 became quickly over capacity, resulting in the fire marshall blocking the doors, refusing any additional entry, resulting in any interested media and industry representatives to stand in the street stories below to listen, or miss the band entirely. A day party found the group unexpectedly backing up Jon Langford for his Bloodshot Records showcase, and the Beauvilles were subsequently invited back as an official showcasing artist for SXSW 2010, subsequently performing at the annual festival every year the group remained active. The group was additionally offered headlining slots at the (now defunct) CMJ music festival in New York City. performing in several subsequent installments of the College Radio Journal festivals.

In 2009 and 2010 the group performed the Harvest of Hope Festival put on by No Idea Records sharing bills with The National, Against Me!, Broken Social Scene, Billy Bragg, and Girl Talk among others. The group has also headlined at the annual NPR station WMNF 88.5 FM Heatwave Music Festival and has also been a regular invitee to the annual FMF music industry festival in Orlando, FL. During this period the group went through its final lineup changes, were signed to Nimbleslick Artists Agency, and the GT Group in Athens Georgia for artist representation. Touring as a trio for the remainder of its existence, the band acted as an opener for a variety of artists on College Circuit tours such as Alejandro Escovedo, the Black Angles, Jason Isbell, and Drive By Truckers before disbanding.

In 2010 the band New Order announced that the Beauvilles were invited to contributed the song "Paradise" by New Order, for the compilation 'CEREMONY' compilation; Proceeds from the record sales will go to the charitable Salford Foundation Trust's Tony Wilson Award, in honor of the late founder of Factory Records. That September the band recorded and filmed two live unreleased tracks, "Hooker" and "Turn Out The Lights," at North Avenue Studios in Orange City, Florida, for the studio's nationally syndicated "Off The Avenue" sessions. These would be the final released recordings by the band before disbanding, and were never formally released on record, aside compilations releases.

In late 2012, Kyle announced that the Beauvilles would be on permanent hiatus, with members pursuing other projects; Kyle going on to front the bands Florida Kilos, Laurel Canyon and AMFMS, and drummer Norton with ATO records artist Benjamin Booker, and Olivia Jean

After a pair of final shows in 2013, it was stated that the group was officially disbanded and would not reform.

== Band name ==
While the band in its current scope was founded in 2002, vocalist and songwriter Shawn Kyle has used the name the Beauvilles for personal musical projects since 1996, and is often assumed to be the group's namesake due to occasionally using Beauville as a surname.

In various conflicting interviews over time he and other founding member Craig Holmes have claimed to have come up with the name from a variety of vague sources; cities in Europe, 1950s automobile models, Beauville being his last name because of adoption or losing a card game, a military base that he and other members of the band grew up on in Texas, a French gambling house, a group of southern spiritualists, or the desire to give listeners the idea they had discovered a recording of an obscure band from the 1960s like The Beau Brummels. Kyle later admitted it was his teenage nickname due to the car he drove.

== Discography ==
=== Albums ===
- 2005 - Singapore (EP)

1. Where We Start 3:48
2. Singapore 3:56
3. Gasoline 3:30
4. Oriental Rug 3:36

- 2009 - Whispering Sin

1. Broad Sigh Dead 5:33
2. Coming Apart 3:51
3. Lips (Fourteens) 2:38
4. Tropic of Cancer 3:34
5. Prom Dress 5:17
6. The Revival 3:47
7. Last Hymn of the Gloriousy Beat 1:20
8. Sing for Us 3:54
9. Bougainvillea 3:51
10. Snow 3:12
11. Pretty In Pale 3:21
12. Whispering Sin 4:50

=== Compilations ===
- 2004 - In the Raw, the Best of Season 1: Recordings from the State Theater ("The Red Lounge")
- 2005 - Southeastern Music Alliance Vol 1. ("With Your Car Radio On")
- 2007 - Pabst Blue Ribbon Live Compilation ("Lips Fourteens")
- 2008 - Yer Cheatin' Heart ("Lips Fourteens")
- 2009 - Tales of Lust and Longing ("Snow")
