= Arthur O'Leary (composer) =

Irish composer and pianist

Arthur O'Leary (15 March 1834 – 11 March 1919) was an Irish composer, pianist and teacher.

== Biography ==
O'Leary was born in Tralee, County Kerry, both his father (also named Arthur) and uncle Daniel having been talented musicians, too. Arthur Senior was said to be first cousin to Arthur Sullivan's grandfather in an obituary for O'Leary written by W. H. Grattan Flood. When young Arthur's talents were discovered at the age of ten, a visiting barrister, Wyndham Goold became his patron: in May 1844 he sent him to school in Dublin and secured private piano tuition. With financial backing from others, including John Stanford (father of Charles Villiers Stanford), and with letters of introduction from William Sterndale Bennett, O'Leary was able to study at the conservatory in Leipzig, where he arrived in 1847 to study piano (with Ignaz Moscheles), organ, violin, and harmony (with Julius Rietz). During this time he was invited several times to musical dinners where he met, besides Moscheles, Felix Mendelssohn-Bartholdy and Joseph Joachim. He also attended Mendelssohn's funeral in 1847.

Between February 1852 and December 1854 O'Leary studied the piano with Cipriani Potter and Sterndale Bennett at the Royal Academy of Music (RAM), London. He became an assistant professor at the RAM in 1856 and elected a fellow in 1864, teaching piano and composition. Among his more notable pupils were Charles Villiers Stanford, Arthur Sullivan, Stanley Hawley, Alicia Adelaide Needham, and Agnes Clune Quinlan. He also had other teaching positions in London at institutions including the National Training School for Music (from 1876), the Guildhall School (1880–1900), the Crystal Palace School of Science and Art (from 1886), and the Beckenham School of Music (from 1894). He resigned from the RAM and other positions in 1903. He was elected a member of the Philharmonic Society in 1875.

O'Leary had married Rosetta Vinning on 5 November 1860 and they had two daughters, Catherine Wyndham and Annette Elizabeth. Annette married Harry Pye, son of Kellow Pye in 1897. Arthur and Rosetta both died in London (Rosetta in 1909), and they are buried in Aghadoe cemetery near Killarney, Ireland. Annette and Harry Pye had one son, Edmund Arthur Pye, born in 1902. He was educated at Epsom College and studied medicine at Cambridge and St. George's Hospital, London. He married Dorothy Neville in London in 1928, separating after three years, having had one son. Edmund Arthur Pye left his medical career behind after the second world war when, along with his second wife Anne Welsh, he embarked on his better-known career as yachtsman and writer, using the name Peter Pye. His son Patrick Pye was raised in Dublin by his mother and became an artist.

== Selected compositions ==
Arthur O'Leary's largest work is a symphony performed in London in 1853 and 1864. Although he wrote a number of other orchestral pieces, his main work consists of piano music and songs. Raymond Deane commented: "At the very least, he was a superior drawing-room composer who occasionally touched deeper chords." The following list is based on Fitzsimons (2008), p. 132–6 (see Bibliography below).

Orchestral (all unpublished)

- Symphony in C major (1853)
- Suite (1856)
- Piano Concerto in E minor (undated, c.1850s/60s)
- Dances (1863). Contains: 1. Stamp-Galop; 2. Ducal Waltz; 3. Beethoven-Waltz.
- Pastorale (1865)

Piano music

- Rondo grazioso, Op. 1 (London: Leader & Cock, 1859).
- Zwei Klavierstücke, Op. 2 (Leipzig: Kistner, 1855). Contains: Andante con moto, Scherzo.
- Overture to Longfellow's Spanish Student, Op. 3 for piano 4-hands (Leipzig: Kistner, 1855).
- Caprice/Overture, Op. 4 (n.d.)
- There's Nae Luck About the House, Morceau de concert (London: Lamborn, Cock & Co., 1872).
- The Black Knight. Romance, Op. 5 (1859) (London: Lamborn, Cock & Co., 1875).
- Im Gebirge. Drei Charakterstücke, Op. 7 (Leipzig: Kistner, 1860).
- Fête rustique, Op. 8 (London: Ewer & Co.).
- Fleurs et pleurs, Op. 9
- Five Marches with words ad libitum (London: Ewer & Co., 1861).
- The Stamp Galop (London: Ewer & Co., 1863; also Boston, 1864).
- Beethoven-Waltz (London: Ewer & Co., 1863).
- Seven National Airs (London: Ewer & Co., 1864).
- Il fiore, Minuetto in B♭, Op. 11 (London: Lamborn, Cock, Hutchings & Co., 1862).
- Chant des sirènes, Morceau de Concert (London, Ewer & Co., 1863).
- Pastorale, Op. 13 (London: Ewer & Co., 1864).
- Kate of Aberdeen (London: Ewer & Co., 1864).
- Conte mauresque, Op. 14 (London: Ewer & Co., 1864).
- The Ducal Waltz (London, 1864).
- The Firemen's Galop (London: Ewer & Co., 1865).
- L'Adieu, Chanson allemande (London, Ewer & Co., 1865).
- L'Adieu du conscrit (London, Ewer & Co., 1866).
- Wayside Sketches, Op. 23 London: Novello, Ewer & Co., 1908). Contains: 1. Waving Ferns, 1870; 2. [in E major, 1871, missing]; 3. in E♭ major, no title, 1872; 4. in B♭ major, 1875; 5. Les Pèlerins.
- Thema in c-moll mit Variationen (Leipzig: Kistner, 1881).
- Toccata in F major (London: Novello, Ewer & Co., 1883).
- Scherzetto in G major (London: Novello, Ewer & Co., 1887).
- Barcarolle (London: Bosworth & Co., 1905).
- Valse heureuse (London: Augener, 1905).
- Scène rustique (London: Augener, 1907).
- Twilight Shadows, Nocturne (London: Novello & Co., 1909).

Songs

- Nacht (4 songs, words by Joseph von Eichendorff) (Leipzig: Kistner, 1854).
- Stars of the Summer Night (Henry Wadsworth Longfellow) (London: Leader & Cock, 1854).
- Six Songs, Op. 6 (London: Leader & Cock, 1861). Contains: I Dream of Thee (Barry Cornwall), Ask Me Not (Barry Cornwall), The Return (Robert Southey), Spring, Silent Evening, The West Wind (W.C. Bryant)'.
- Kate of Aberdeen (London: Ewer & Co., 1864).
- Listening (Adelaide A. Procter) (London: Novello, Ewer & Co., 1868).
- The Maiden's Suspense (W. Dulcken) (London, 1870).
- The Tree's Early Leaflets (transl. from Björnsen) (London: Lamborn, Cock & Co., 1870).
- For Rosabelle (London: Lamborn, Cock & Co., 18719.

Church music

- Mass of St John for chorus and organ (London: Burns, Oates & Co., 1869).
- Mass for Two Voice Parts and Organ (London: Novello & Co., 1903).
- Regina Coeli, A Marian Antiphon in 4 parts (London: Cary and Co., No. 715 (before 1898)

== Recordings ==
- Arthur O'Leary: Piano Music from the Victorian Age, performed by Anthony Byrne (piano), GDD 001 (CD, 2002). Contains (in this order): Scène rustique, Twilight Shadows (Nocturne), Waving Ferns op. 23/1, Barcarolle, Fleurs et pleurs op. 9, Pastorale op. 13, Minuet in B flat op. 11, Fête rustique op. 8, Les Pèlerins op. 23/5, Zwei Clavierstücke op. 2, Rondo grazioso op. 1, Valse heureuse.
- Fallen Leaves from an Irish Album, performed by Una Hunt (piano), RTÉ Lyric fm CD 109 (CD, 2006). Contains: Valse heureuse.

== Bibliography ==
- Arthur O'Leary: Memories of Student Life in Germany (London: C. Jaques & Son, 1913).
- Bob Fitzsimons: Arthur O'Leary, Composer (Tralee: Samhlaíocht Chiarraí, 1998), ISBN 0-9528087-4-9.
- Bob Fitzsimons: Arthur O'Leary & Arthur Sullivan. Musical Journeys from Kerry to the Heart of Victorian England (Tralee: Doghouse, 2008), ISBN 978-0-9558746-1-1. Reviewed by Raymond Deane in the Journal of Music (January 2009).
