= Fishing in Cornwall =

Economic activity in the English county

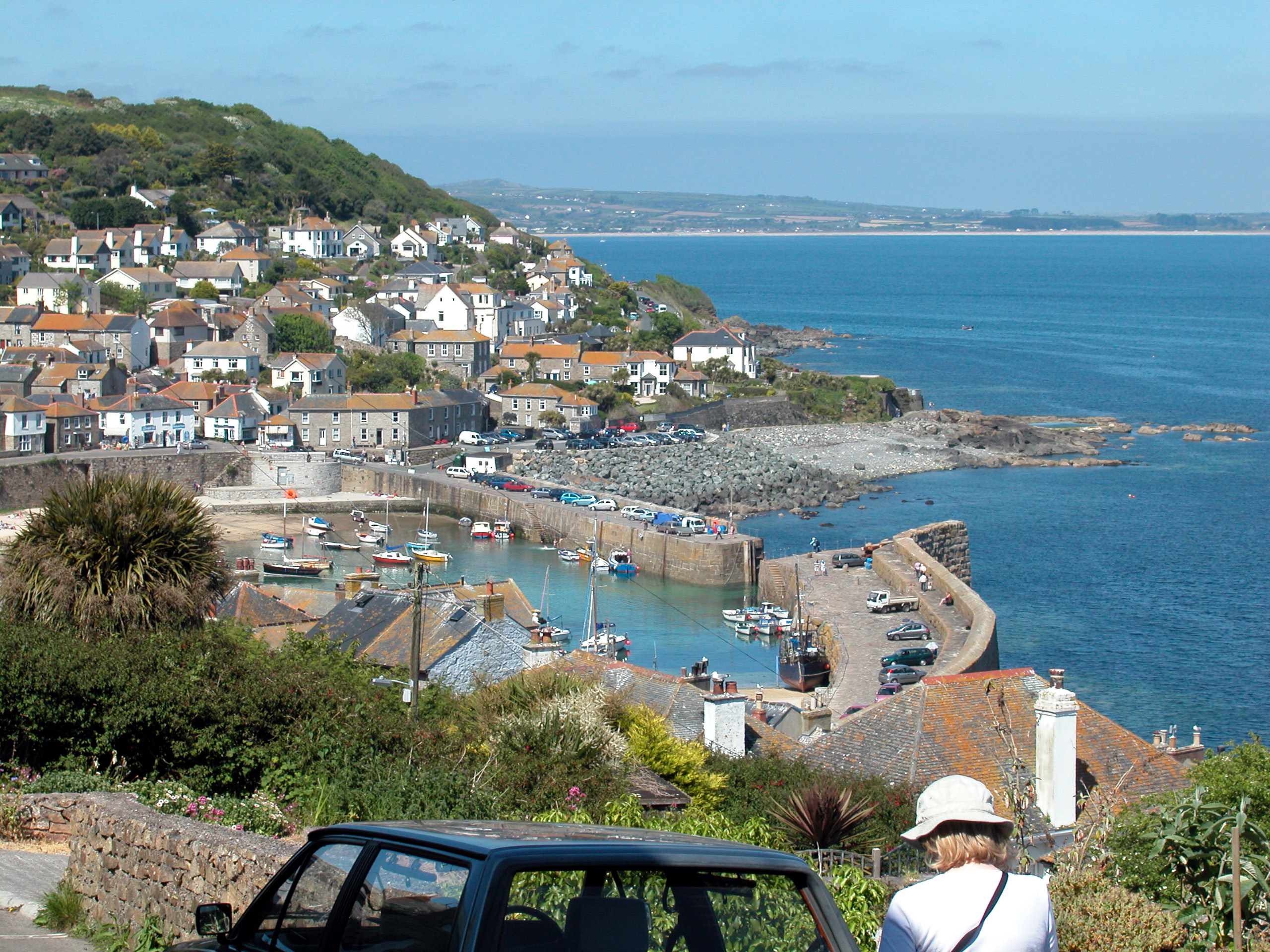
Mousehole Harbour

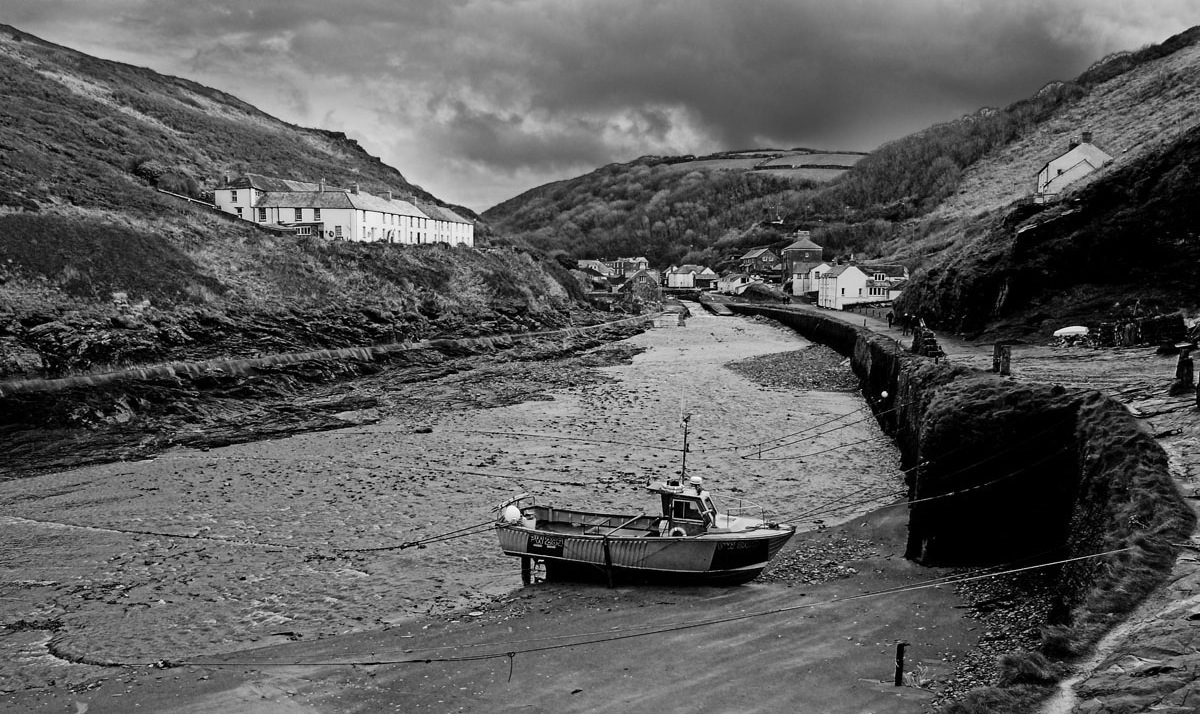
Boscastle Harbour

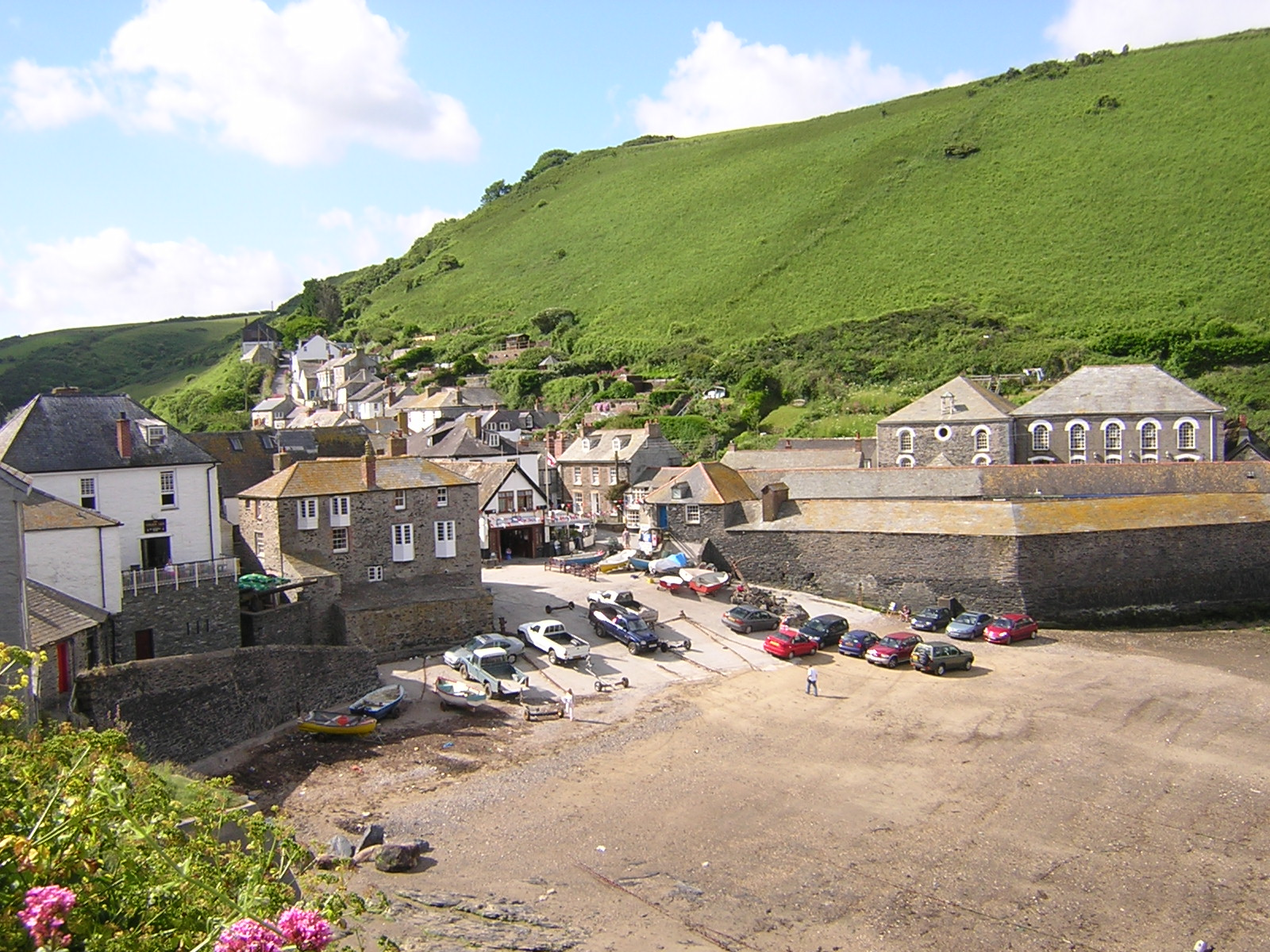
Port Isaac, a historic fishing village on the north coast of Cornwall

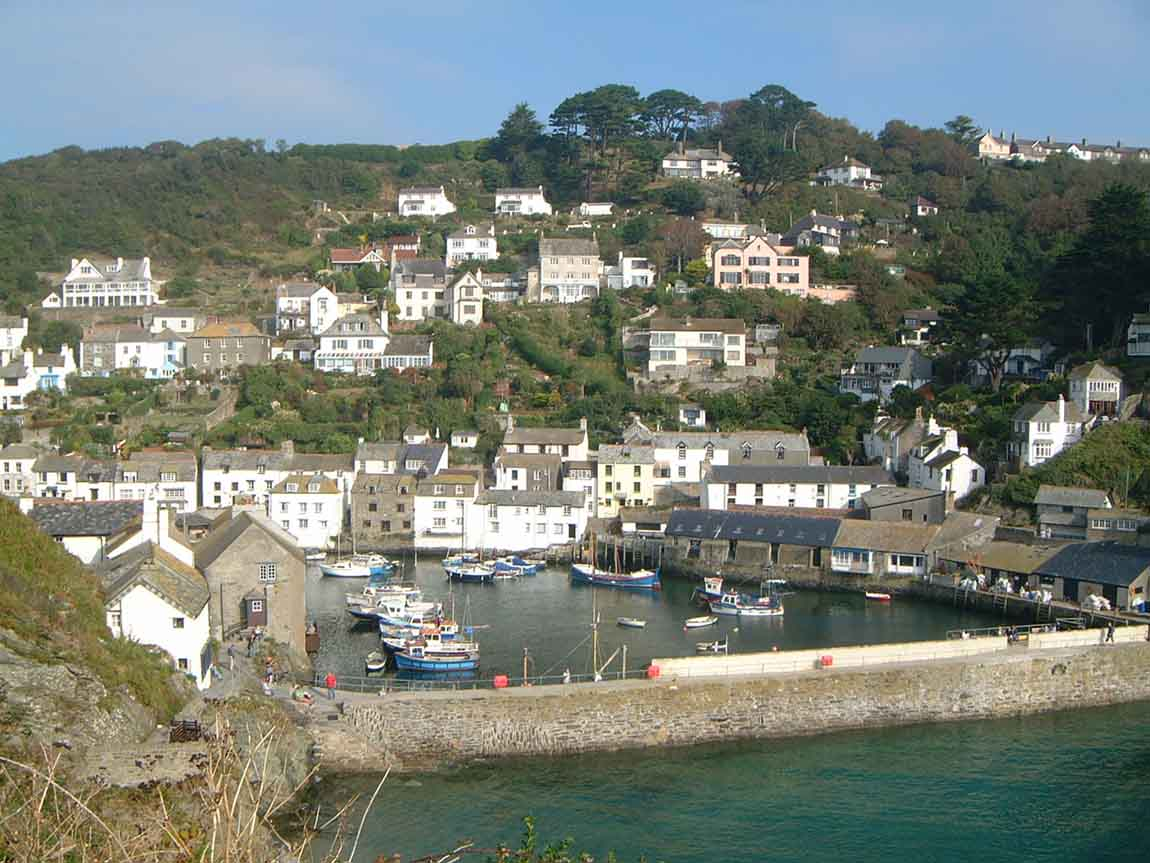
Polperro, on the south coast of Cornwall, has been an active fishing and smuggling port since the 12th century

Fishing in Cornwall, England, UK, has traditionally been one of the main elements of the economy of the county. Pilchard fishing and processing was a thriving industry in Cornwall from around 1750 to around 1880, after which it went into an almost terminal decline. During the 20th century the varieties of fish taken became much more diverse and crustaceans such as crab and lobster are now significant. Much of the catch is exported to France due to the higher prices obtainable there. Though fishing has been significantly damaged by overfishing, the Southwest Handline Fishermen's Association has started to revive the fishing industry. As of 2007, stocks were improving (cf. River Cottage: Gone Fishing 22/11/08). The Cornwall Sea Fisheries Committee is one of 12 committees responsible for managing the corresponding Sea Fisheries District. The Isles of Scilly Sea Fisheries Committee is responsible for the Scilly district.

The industry has featured in numerous works of art, particularly by Stanhope Forbes and other Newlyn School artists.

== History ==
=== Early history ===
The beginnings of a significant fishery in Cornwall may be traced to the reign of King John, and by the time of the Tudors the industry had become of national importance. It was much regulated under the rule of Queen Elizabeth I. In 1582 nearly two thousand mariners are recorded for Cornwall and somewhat more for Devon. In 1602 Richard Carew describes the fisheries of Cornwall and Devon as much more important than those of eastern England. Two methods were in use at the time: seining and drifting. In the early years of the 17th century the fishermen of Cornwall and Devon were also heavily involved in the Newfoundland fisheries. In the decade 1747–1756 the total number of pilchards dispatched from the four principal Cornish ports of Falmouth, Fowey, Penzance and St Ives averaged 30,000 hogsheads annually (making a total of 900 million fish). Much greater catches were achieved in 1790 and 1796. The majority of the pilchard catch was exported to Italy. Before the mid 18th century the season generally ran from July till November or December, but during the 19th century usually from August to October.

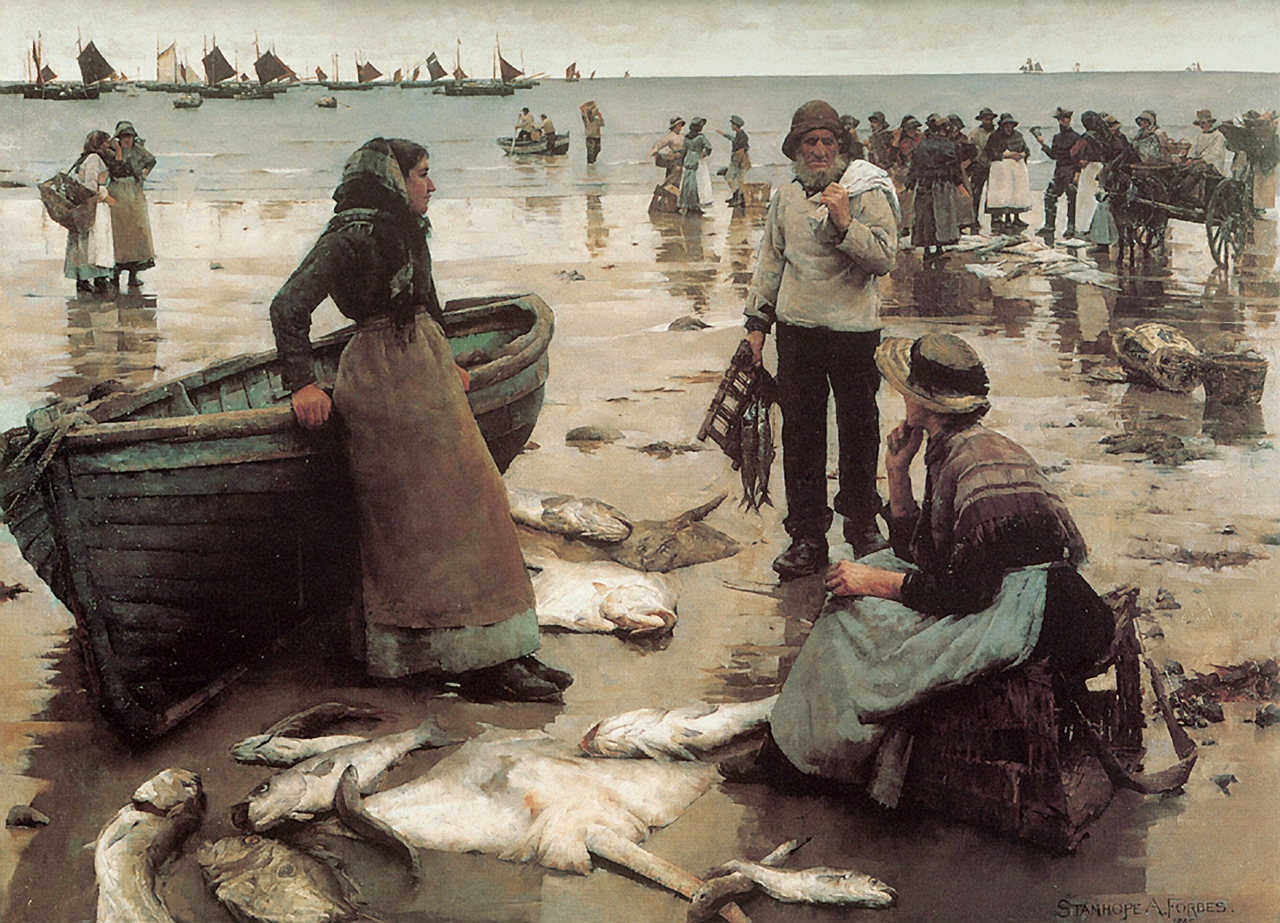
A Fish Sale on a Cornish Beach (1885), oil painting by Stanhope Forbes

In 1847 the exports of pilchards from Cornwall amounted to 40,883 hogsheads or 122 million fish, while the greatest number ever taken in one seine was 5,600 hogsheads at St Ives in 1868.

Huers (cliff top lookouts) helped locate shoals of fish. The huer would shout "Hevva!, Hevva!" to alert the boats to the location of the pilchard shoals. Cornish tradition states that Hevva cake was baked by the huers on their return to their homes, the cake being ready by the time the crews returned to land. The Cornish lugger was a traditional type of fishing boat and at Polperro Polperro Gaffers were used.

== Fishing ports ==
=== North coast ===
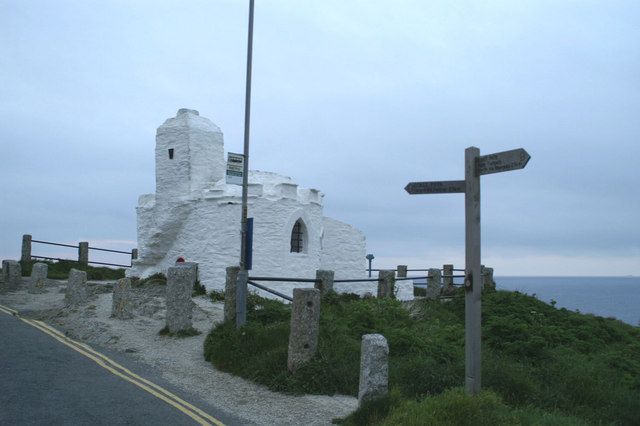
Huer's hut at Newquay

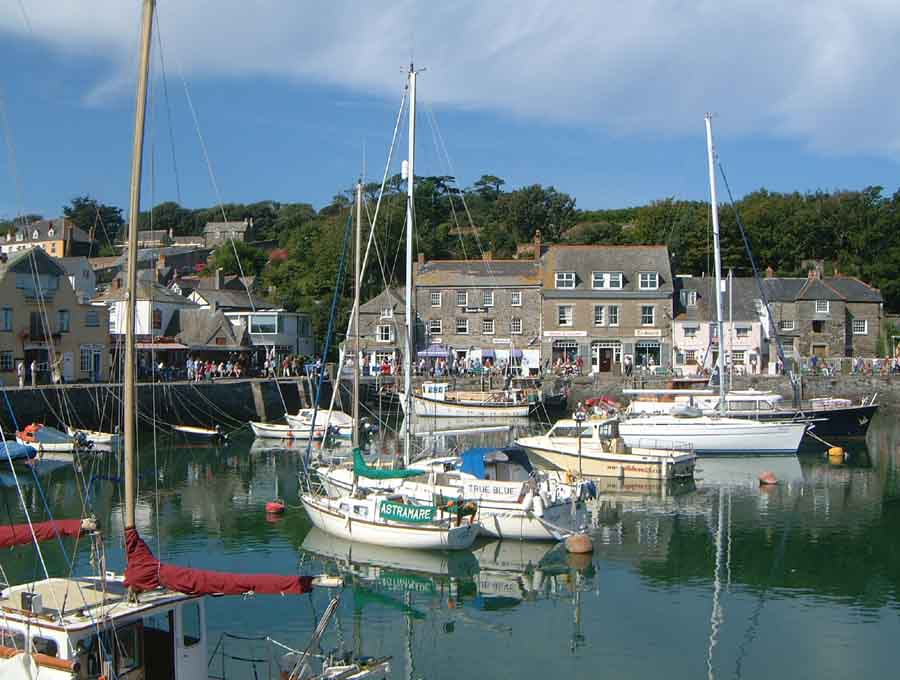
Padstow harbour and quayside

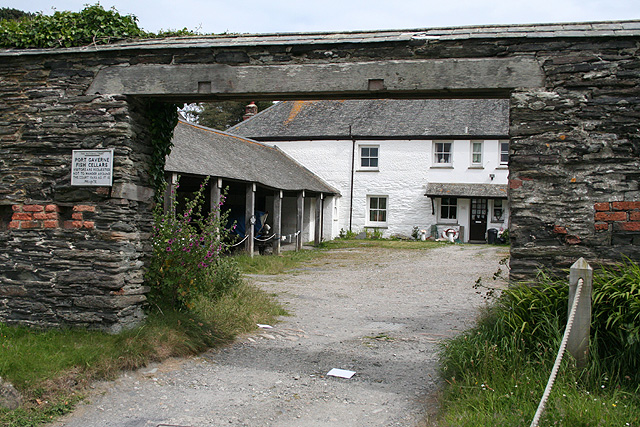
Fish cellars at Port Gaverne

The most important fishing ports on the north coast were St Ives, which had a considerable fleet and Padstow. A. K. Hamilton Jenkin describes how the St Ives fisherman strictly observed Sunday as a day of rest. St Ives was a very busy fishing port, and seining was the usual method of fishing there. Seining was carried on by a set of three boats of different sizes, the largest two carrying seine nets of different sizes. The total number of crew was 17 or 18. However this came to an end in 1924. The bulk of the catch was exported to Italy: for example in 1830 6,400 hogsheads were sent to Mediterranean ports. From 1829 to 1838 the yearly average for this trade was 9,000 hogsheads. One remarkable catch at St Ives was of one thousand hogsheads in three seine nets, approximately 2,400,000 fish in all.

In 1870 the Gurnard's Head seine fishery was worth an estimated £800 per year and employed twenty-four men with ten boats and two seines. The pilchards were sold locally as fresh pilchards rather than salted and sold as fumadoes for the Mediterranean market.

A new harbour was built at St Agnes in 1798 which supported a fishing industry and allowed for the export of copper ore and the import of coal from South Wales for the smelters at the mines. In 1802, a pilchard fishing industry was established from the harbour at St Agnes, reaching its peak in 1829 and 1830 before declining. St Agnes remained a busy port until the collapse of the harbour wall in a storm in 1915/16. There are only remains of the old harbour in existence.

Up to the early 20th century, Newquay was a small fishing port famous for pilchards and there is a "Huer's Hut" above the harbour from which a lookout would cry "Hevva!" to call out the fishing fleet when pilchard shoals were spotted. The town's present insignia is two pilchards. The real pilchards have long gone, but a small number of boats still catch the local edible crabs and lobsters.

On the north east coast the harbours are generally smaller and Port Isaac, Port Quin (now deserted), Bossiney and Boscastle have relied on fishing, though there is a larger harbour at Bude. In the eighteenth century there was a small unprotected tidal harbour at Bude, but it was difficult whenever the sea was up. The Bude Canal Company built a canal and improved the harbour. Nowadays around twenty small boats use the tidal moorings of the original harbour during the summer months. Most are sport fishermen, but there is also some small-scale, semi-commercial, fishing for crab and lobster.

=== South coast, western ===
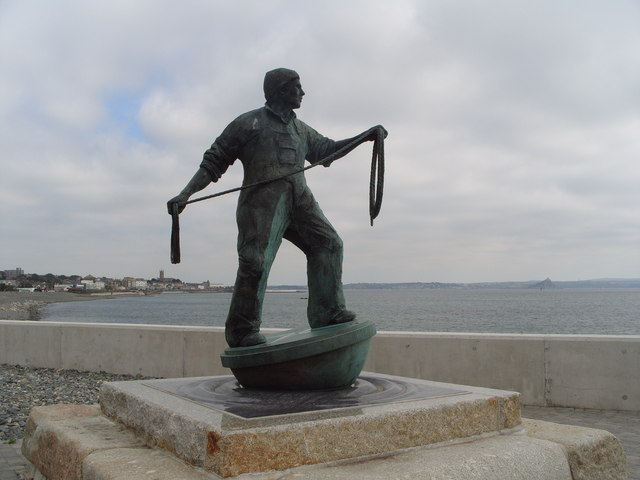
The Fisherman statue near Newlyn commemorates all those fishermen who have been lost at sea

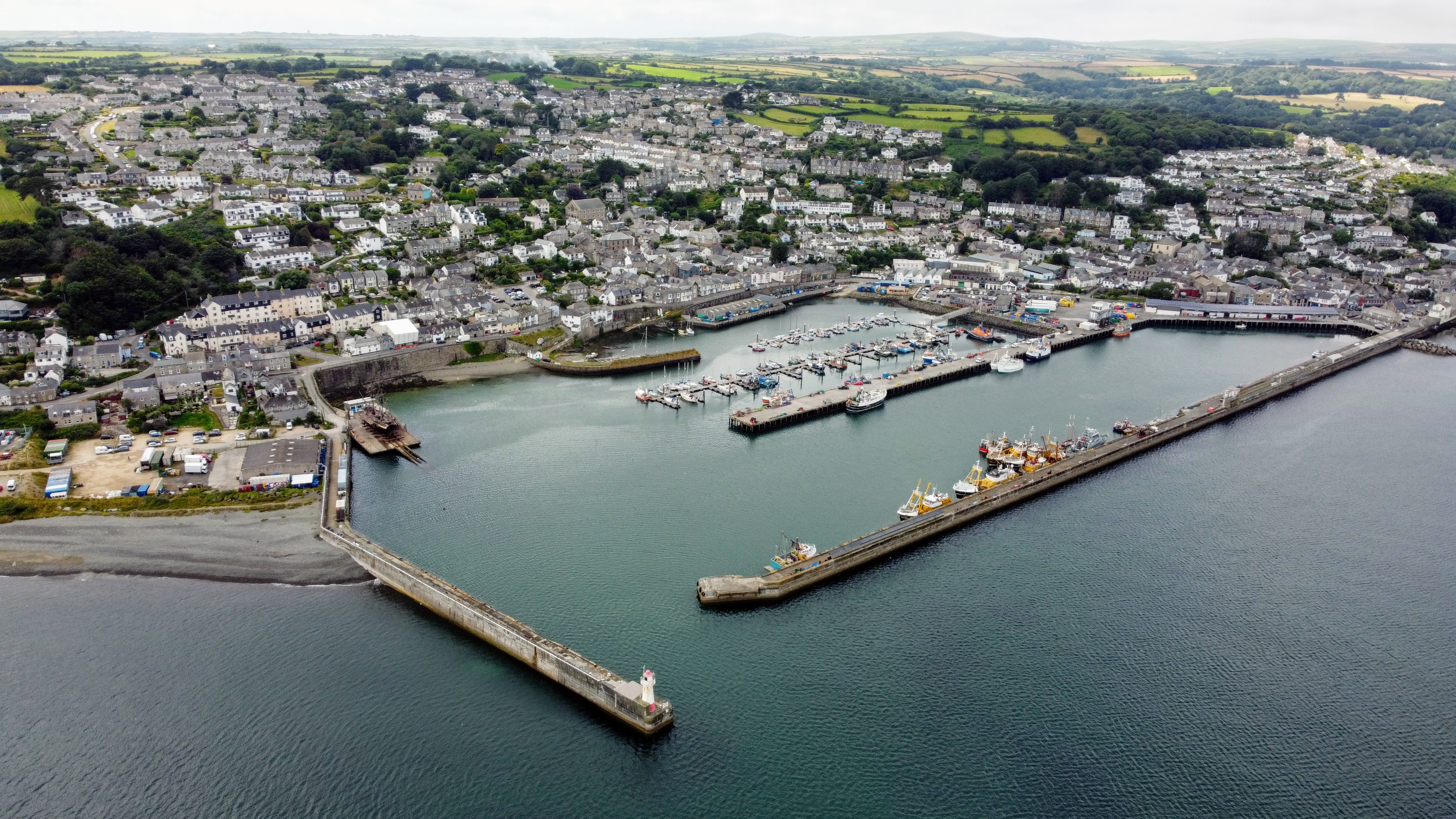
Newlyn Harbour

The principal industry in Newlyn is fishing, and the town relies upon its harbour. Newlyn's history has been strongly linked to its role as a major fishing port. The natural protection afforded by the Gwavas Lake (an area of seawater in Mount's Bay) led to many local fishermen using this area as a preferred landing site."The Harbour".. Newlyn harbour is first recorded in 1435 by the Bishop of Exeter; later large scale improvements to the harbour led to Newlyn becoming the predominant fishing port in Mount's Bay. Newlyn harbour is the largest deep sea fishing port in England in terms of the value of fish landed (turnover >£18 million 2004) and contributes 2% of the region's GDP. The Newlyn fleet utilises a variety of catching methods, however, the vessels are comparatively small and mostly owned by their skippers in comparison with the large factory boats of Spain and France with whom they share their fishing grounds. Accusations of illegal overfishing by the French and Spanish fleets is a source of local friction. Until the 1960s, pilchards were the major catch landed at Newlyn, which were processed at the nearby pilchard works, before the fish fell out of favour with the public. A revival of pilchard fishing in Penwith in recent years occurred after a rebranding exercise as Cornish sardines (sardines are actually small pilchards). This has been helped by investment from the Objective One programme. Much of the catch is sold abroad in Spain and Italy.

The Cornish hake fishery, based at Newlyn Harbour, has now been deemed as "sustainable and well-managed". Stocks were left depleted in the 1990s, but now Cornish hake numbers have recovered to nearly double their low point. This turn-around has been achieved through the use of nets with larger mesh size than the legal requirement which allow the smaller juveniles to swim free, leaving more fish to reproduce. Porthleven known locally as ‘Port’ had its harbour built by French prisoners of war after the wreck of HMS Anson. Porthleven was already a typical fishing village that evolved to become a major port in the area for the import of all building materials and coal and export of China clay. Boat building also evolved in Porthleven and became important to that industry. The boat builders, net makers and fish merchants are now gone but the fishing grounds still support a small fleet of privately owned boats.

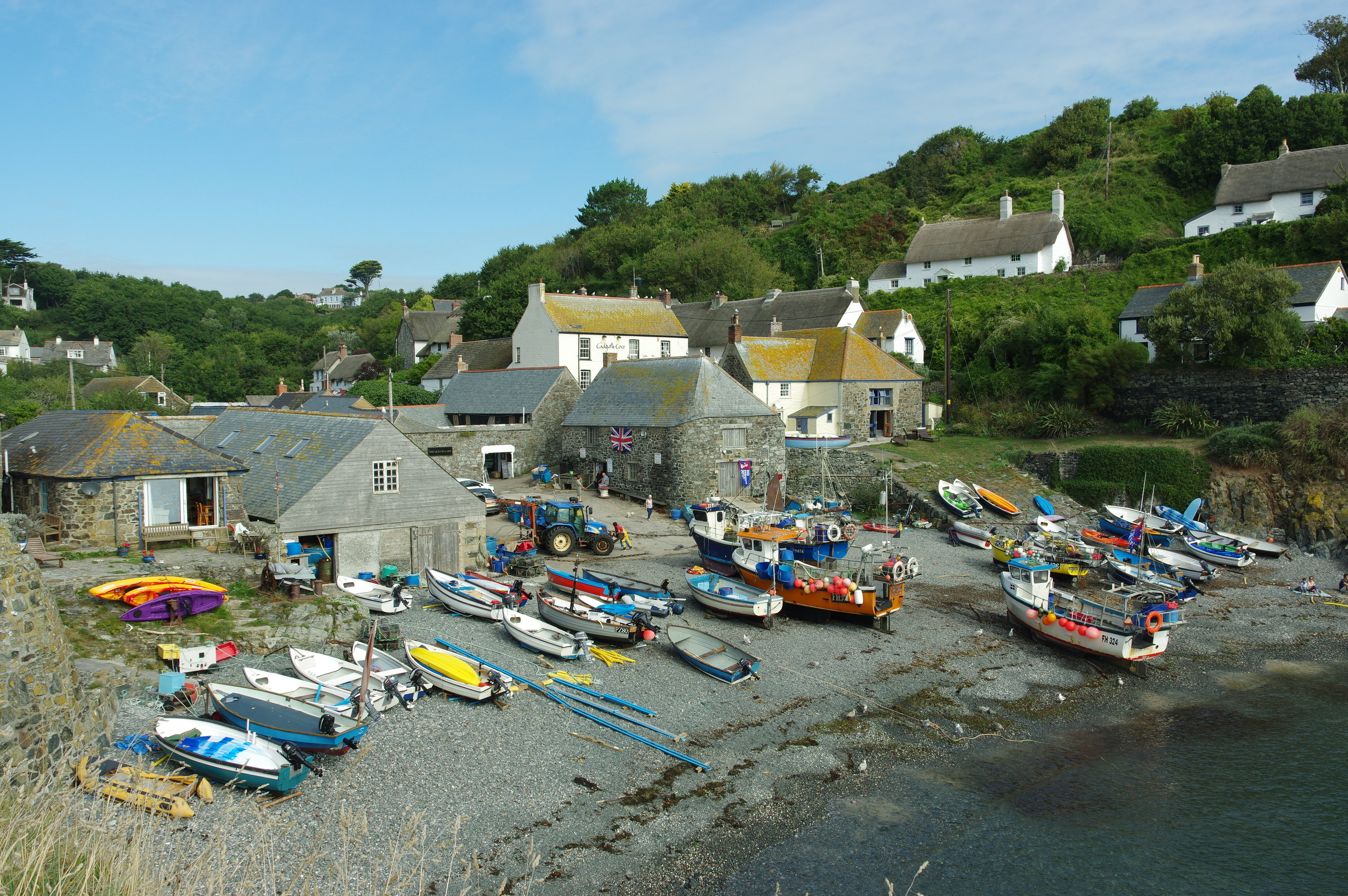
Cadgwith Cove

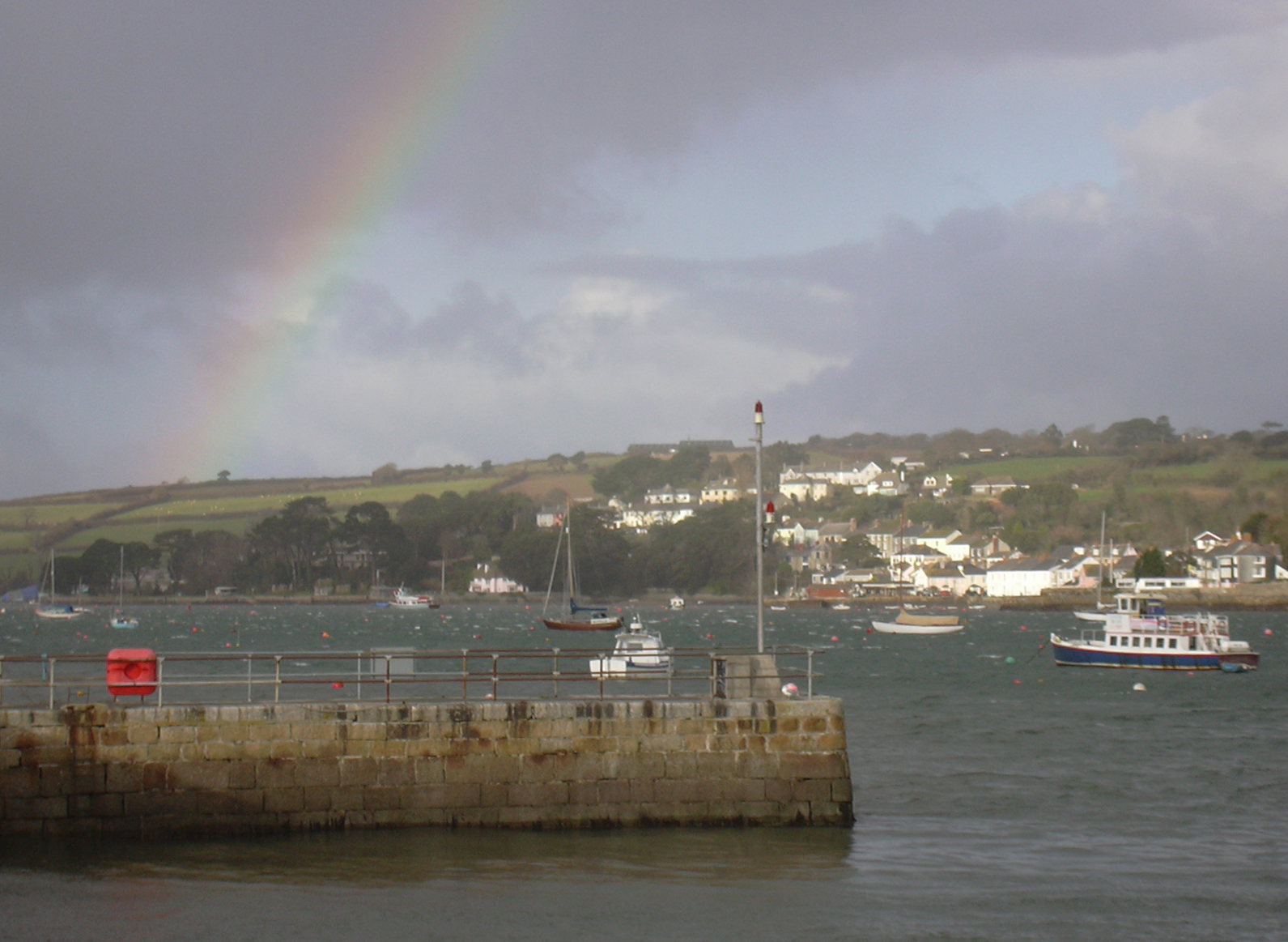
Flushing, from Fish Strand Quay, Falmouth, with rainbow

Cadgwith was established in medieval times as a collection of fishing cellars in a sheltered south-east facing coastal valley with a shingle cove to subsidise local farmers' livelihoods by fishing Cadgwith was originally called Caswydh or Porthcaswydh (thought to be derived from the Cornish word for 'a thicket'; probably because the valley was densely wooded). From the 16th century, the village became inhabited, with fishing as the main occupation. Subsequently, buildings were established as homes, lofts, capstan houses, and cellars constructed of local stone or cob walls, and thatched or slated roofs; which were built along the beach and up the sides of the valley leading to Cadgwith's characteristic Cornish fishing village appearance. Cadgwith owes its existence to the fishing industry. Pilchard fishing occurred until the 1950s using large seine boats and seine nets, which was a system used to enclose the large shoals of pilchards, and coordinated by the use of lookouts, known as huers (from the Cornish 'Hevva, Hevva!' ('Here they are!)), positioned on the cove's two headlands. In 1904, a record 1,798,000 pilchards were landed over four days. Due to overfishing and climate changes pilchards are no longer found in large enough numbers to sustain pilchard fishing in Cadgwith, instead crab and lobster fishing occurs. Brown edible crabs, spider crabs, lobsters, sharks, monkfish, and conger eel are regularly landed with most being sold abroad through fish merchants but some being sold locally by the fishmonger, the café, public house, and seafood snack shop.

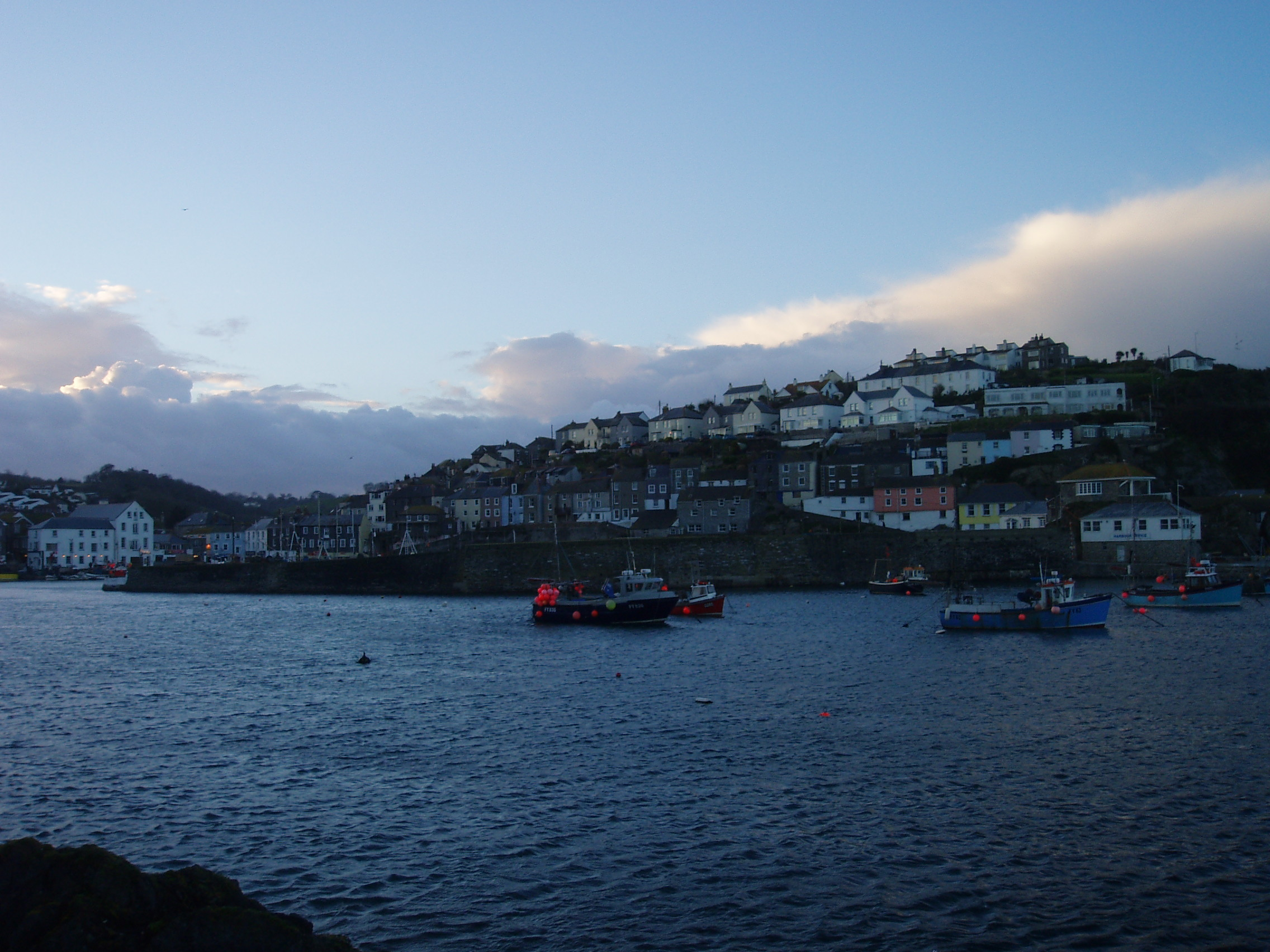
Mevagissey harbour at dusk

In the Helford River oyster fishing has been carried on though pollution has disrupted this. At Port Navas is the Duchy Oyster Farm and the oyster fishery in the River is expanding. In the 19th and 20th century, Flushing's economy mainly relied upon fishing, farming and Falmouth Docks; there are now only a few commercial fishing vessels based in the village.

The current harbour at Mevagissey was built on the site of a medieval quay. In early modern times there was already a thriving pilchard industry; great numbers of the fish were caught, cured and exported to Italy, the West Indies and the Royal Navy; the greatest annual catch being in 1724.The first Act of Parliament allowing the new port to be built was passed in 1774. The inner harbour, consisting of the current East and West Quays was constructed from this time. An outer harbour was added in 1888, but seriously damaged in a blizzard in 1891. The outer walls were rebuilt by 1897. The harbour was given charitable trust status in 1988. There are currently 63 registered fishing vessels in the harbour worked by 69 fishermen. The harbour also offers tourist fishing trips and there is a regular summer passenger ferry to Fowey. The inner and outer harbours are busy with a mixture of pleasure vessels and working fishing boats. It has a thriving fishing industry and is the second biggest fishing port in Cornwall.

=== South coast, eastern ===
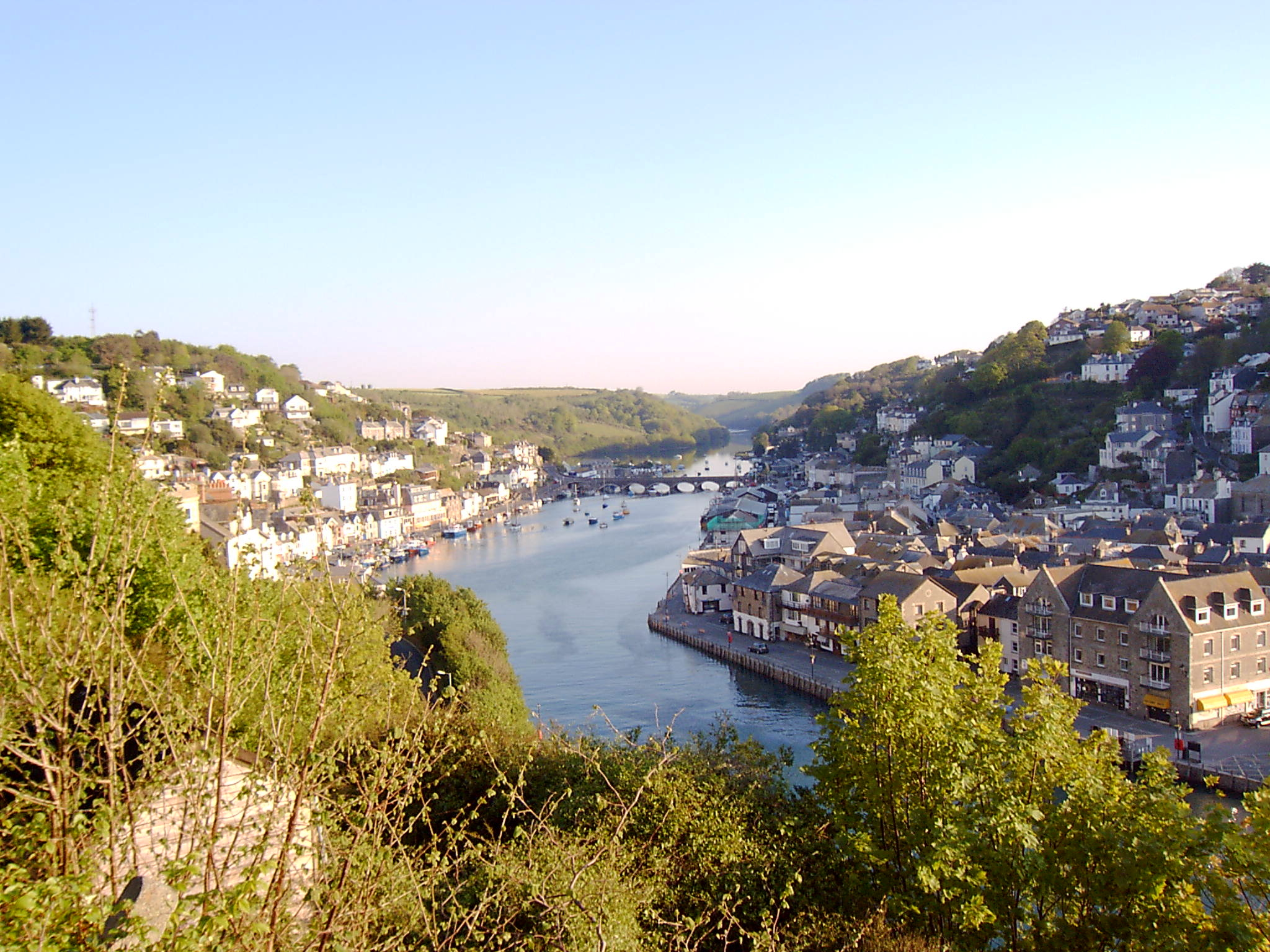
The harbour at Looe (looking northwards)

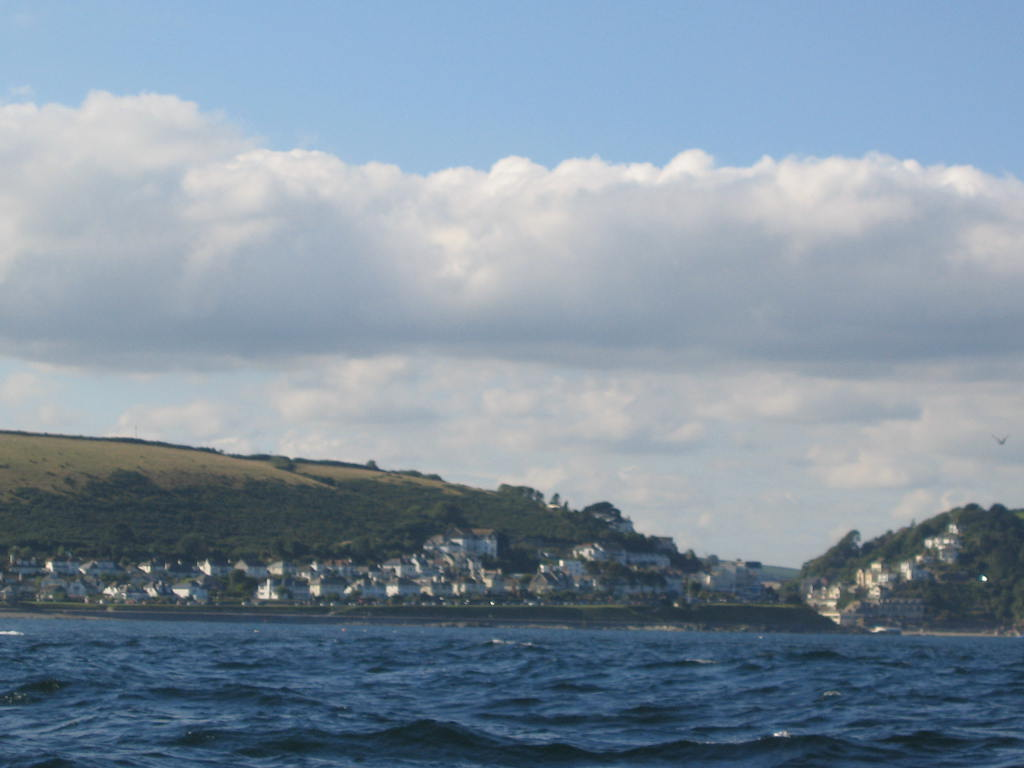
View towards Looe, taken on a boat trip, near Looe Island

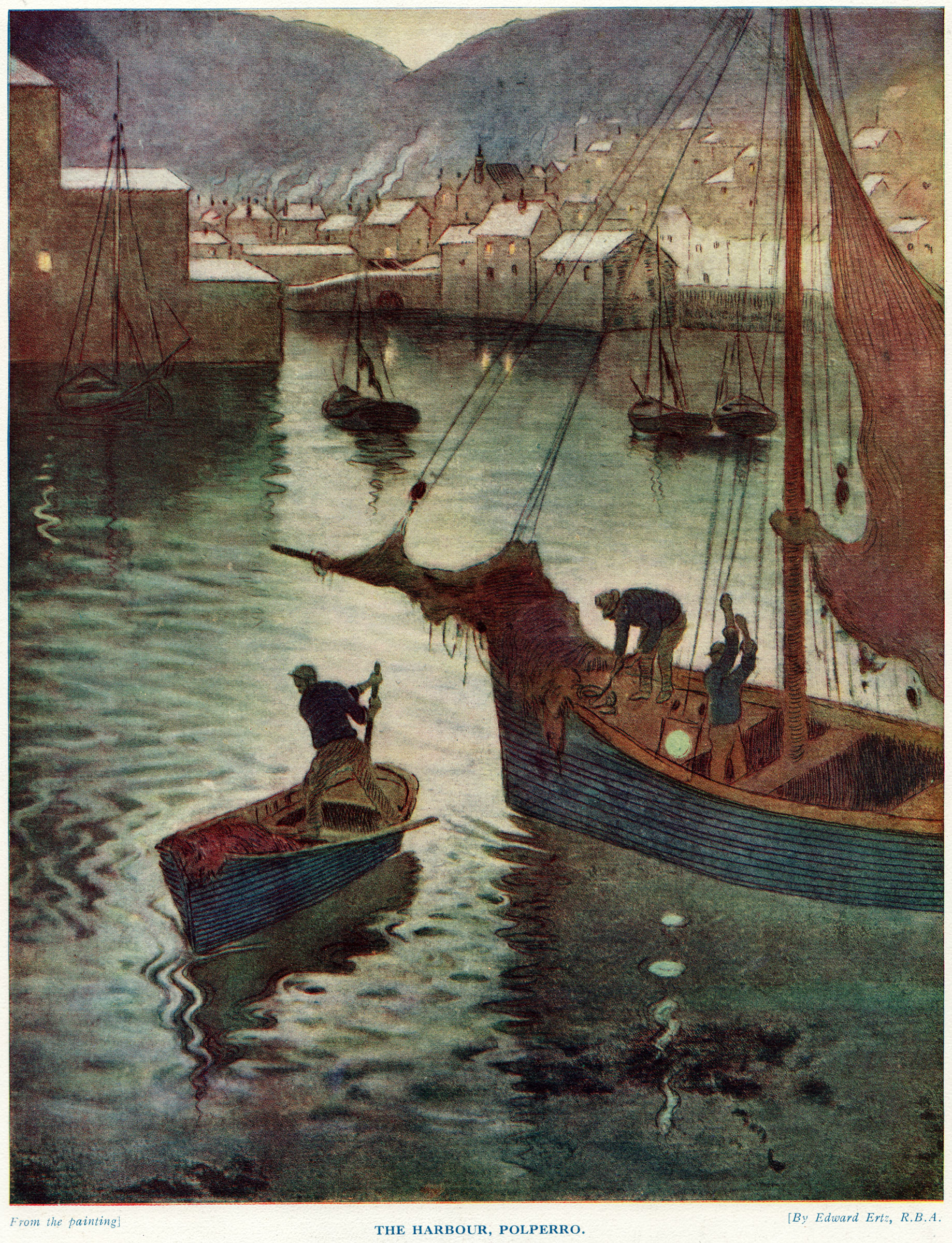
"The Harbour, Polperro" by Edward Frederick Ertz

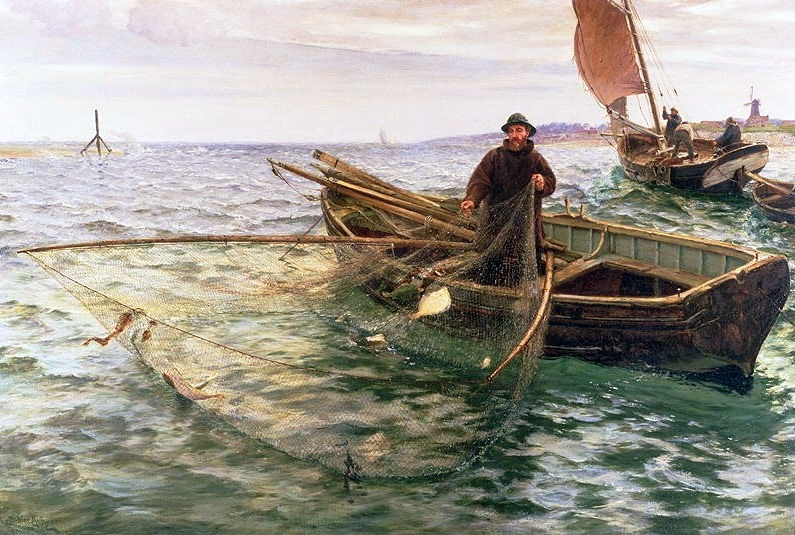
"The Fisherman", an 1888 painting by Charles Napier Hemy

Fowey has thrived as a port for hundreds of years, initially as a trading and naval town, then as the centre for china clay exports. Today Fowey is busy with trawlers and yachts.

Fishing has always been a principal occupation for the people of Polperro. For centuries the village was a pilchard fishing and processing port. The fish were drawn to the south Cornwall coast to feed in late summer and brought rich pickings for local fishermen. Once ashore, the fish were salted and pressed and the oil was collected as a by-product and used for heating and lighting. Polperro pilchards were exported to many parts of Europe. Shoals of the fish diminished in the 20th century and pilchard fishing died out in Polperro in the 1960s, but today the port still has around 12 commercial vessels fishing for flat fish, scallops, crabs, monkfish, ray, pollock, bass and cod. The little fishing port of Polperro, 5 miles west of Looe, had a fleet of small sailing fishing boats known as Polperro Gaffers. Their principal catch was the pilchard but this was a late summer catch and the rest of the year they set long lines, and seine nets. Most were built in Looe, around 26' with a deep 6' draft, a gaff rig on a pole mast stepped on the keel and they dried out on legs in Polperro's drying harbour. Within the village is the Polperro Heritage Museum of Fishing and Smuggling, situated on the harbourside in an old fish processing warehouse, which amongst other things, houses interesting photographs of the village's history. Jonathan Couch, the village doctor for many years, was also a notable ichthyologist and trained in succession a large number of fishermen to aid him in his pursuits. His observations made at and near Polperro during his lifetime and since his death have not been equalled in value at any British station. He was in correspondence with many of the foremost naturalists, and especially rendered aid to Thomas Bewick and to William Yarrell.

At Looe an early wooden bridge over the Looe river was in place by 1411 which burned down and was replaced by the first stone bridge, completed in 1436 and featuring a chapel dedicated to St Anne in the middle (the current bridge, a seven-arched Victorian bridge, was opened in 1853). By this time Looe had become a major port, one of Cornwall's largest, exporting local tin, arsenic and granite, as well as hosting thriving fishing and boatbuilding industries. The town provided some 20 ships for the siege of Calais in 1347. Looe remains a fishing town, and several fish dealers operate from the docks of East Looe. With its fleet of small fishing boats returning their catches to port daily, Looe has a reputation for producing excellent fresh fish. The town is also a centre for shark fishing, and is the home of the Shark Angling Club of Great Britain.

== Lobster hatchery ==
The National Lobster Hatchery is a charitable organisation in Padstow devoted to marine conservation, research and education relating to the European lobster.

== Local culture ==
=== Customs and events ===
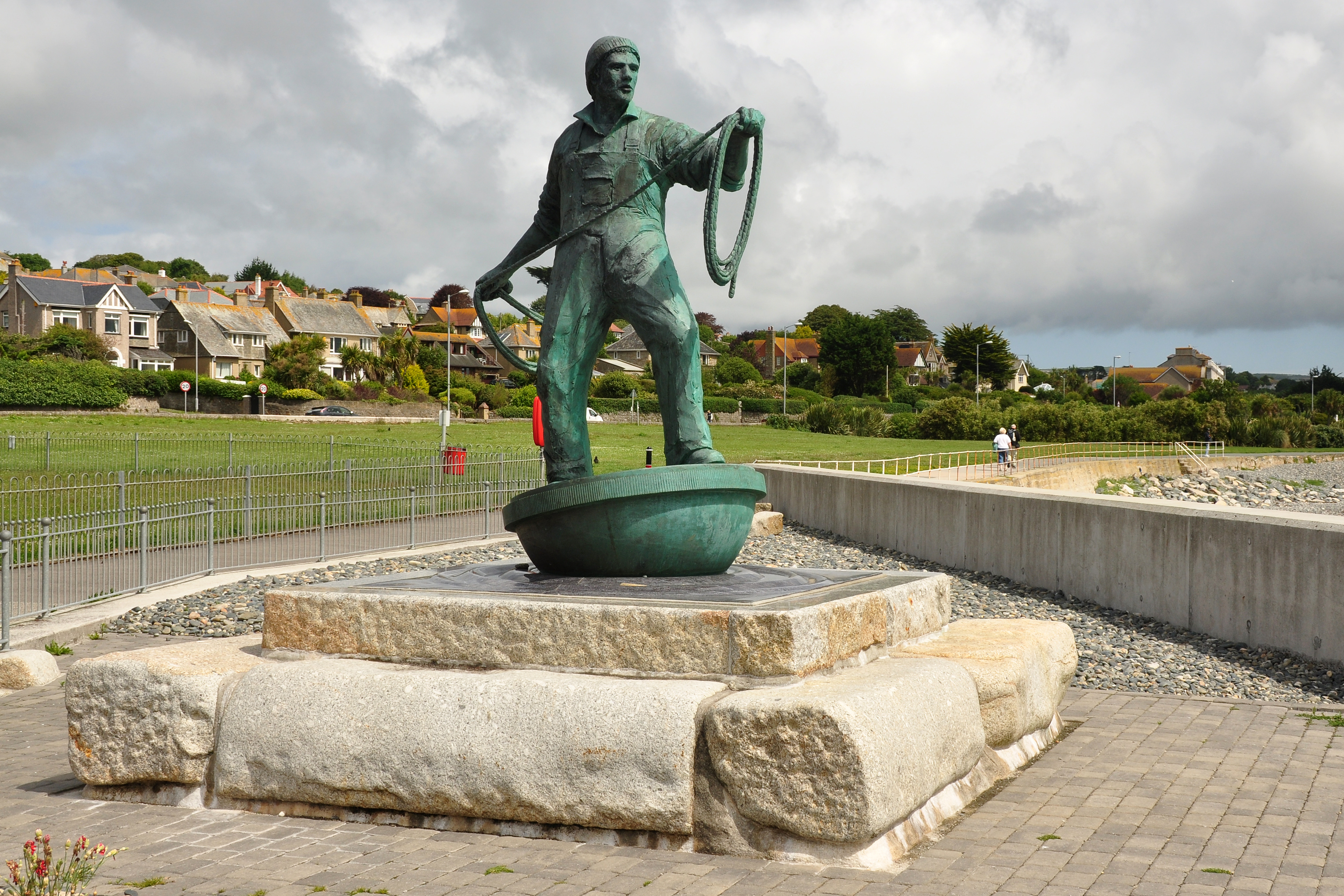
A statue of a Cornish fisherman at Newlyn

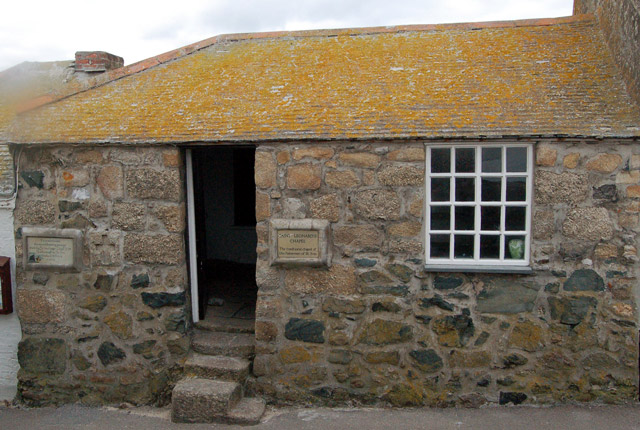
St Leonard's, the fisherman's chapel on Smeaton's Pier in St Ives

There is a tradition of holding celebrations associated with fishing, such as the Falmouth Oyster Festival and Newlyn Fish Festival.

In fishing communities a dance or "troil ... always terminated the pilchard season. This was a feast for those connected with the cellars, each cellar having its own troil. After the feast, which was given in the loft, games and dancing followed. These were kept up until the small hours of the morning, the music being provided by a fiddler." In 1870 William Bottrell considered music integral to harvest home, feast days, even visits to the mill. He mentions 3-hand reels, jigs and ballads sung for dancing. Gorseth Kernow piper Merv Davey's grandfather, Edward Veale, remembered seeing the step dance, Lattapuch, in the Unity Fish Cellars, Newquay in the 1880s. These reports are borne out by dance collection.

There is a late-fifth-century legend in Cornwall that the Archangel Michael appeared to fishermen on St Michael's Mount. According to author Richard Freeman Johnson, this legend is probably a nationalistic twist to a myth.

=== Superstitions ===
Superstitions found among fishermen are numerous. They consider it unlucky to mention rabbits or hares, nor should dogs be taken on board. At Mousehole the same applied to cats. This superstition of Cornish fishermen is mentioned by Carew in his Survey (1602). Mention of various land animals among fishermen in Britain was traditionally taboo. Another superstition relates to clergymen, nuns and church towers. Seeing one of the first two was regarded as unlucky; at Mousehole and Newlyn respectively priests were called "white-chokers" and "fore-and-afters". A church tower was called a "cleeta" or "steeple" as the use of "church" was held to result in bad fishing; the churches of St Buryan and Paul were called "tower" and that of Cury was called "town".

=== Drama and verse ===
- Graffiti outside the South Crofty workings:

Cornish lads are fishermen and Cornish lads are miners too. But when the fish and tin are gone, what are the Cornish boys to do?

(This is from the chorus of the song 'Cornish Lads' by Cornish singer/songwriter Roger Bryant, written at the time of the closure of Geevor Mine. See CD "The Writing's on the Wall" by Roger Bryant. Other recordings by Jinks' Stack and Mike Nicholson.)

- Many of the plays and other works of Nick Darke, who himself fished for lobsters, are concerned with fishing in Cornwall.

=== Food and drink ===
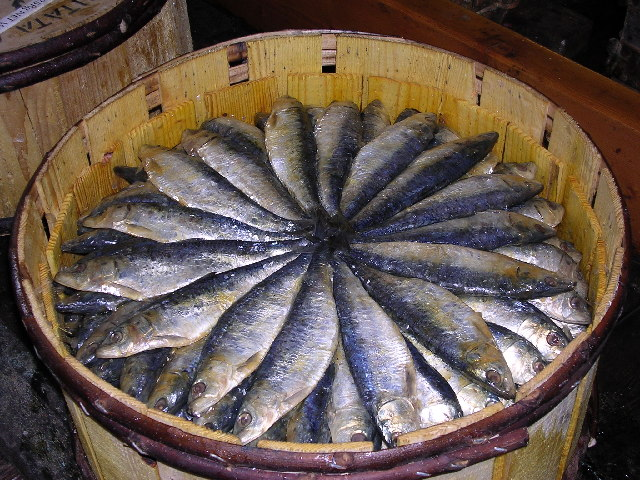
Part of a catch of pilchards

A traditional Cornish pilchard dish is stargazy pie or starry gazy pie.

=== Traditional local measurements ===
Cornish warp – 4 fish; Cornish burn – 21 fish; Cornish hundred – 132 fish; Cornish mease – 505 herring; Cornish cran – 800 herring; Cornish long hundred – 8 times 120+5 fish; Cornish last – 132,000 fish; Cornish ounce – 16th part (of either a seine of fish or property)

=== Films ===
Johnny Frenchman, a 1945 British film directed by Charles Frend, was a story of rivalry between Cornish and Breton fishermen. The film's exterior sequences were shot in the Cornish fishing port of Mevagissey. Bait is a film durected by Mark Jenkin which won a BAFTA award.

== Gallery ==
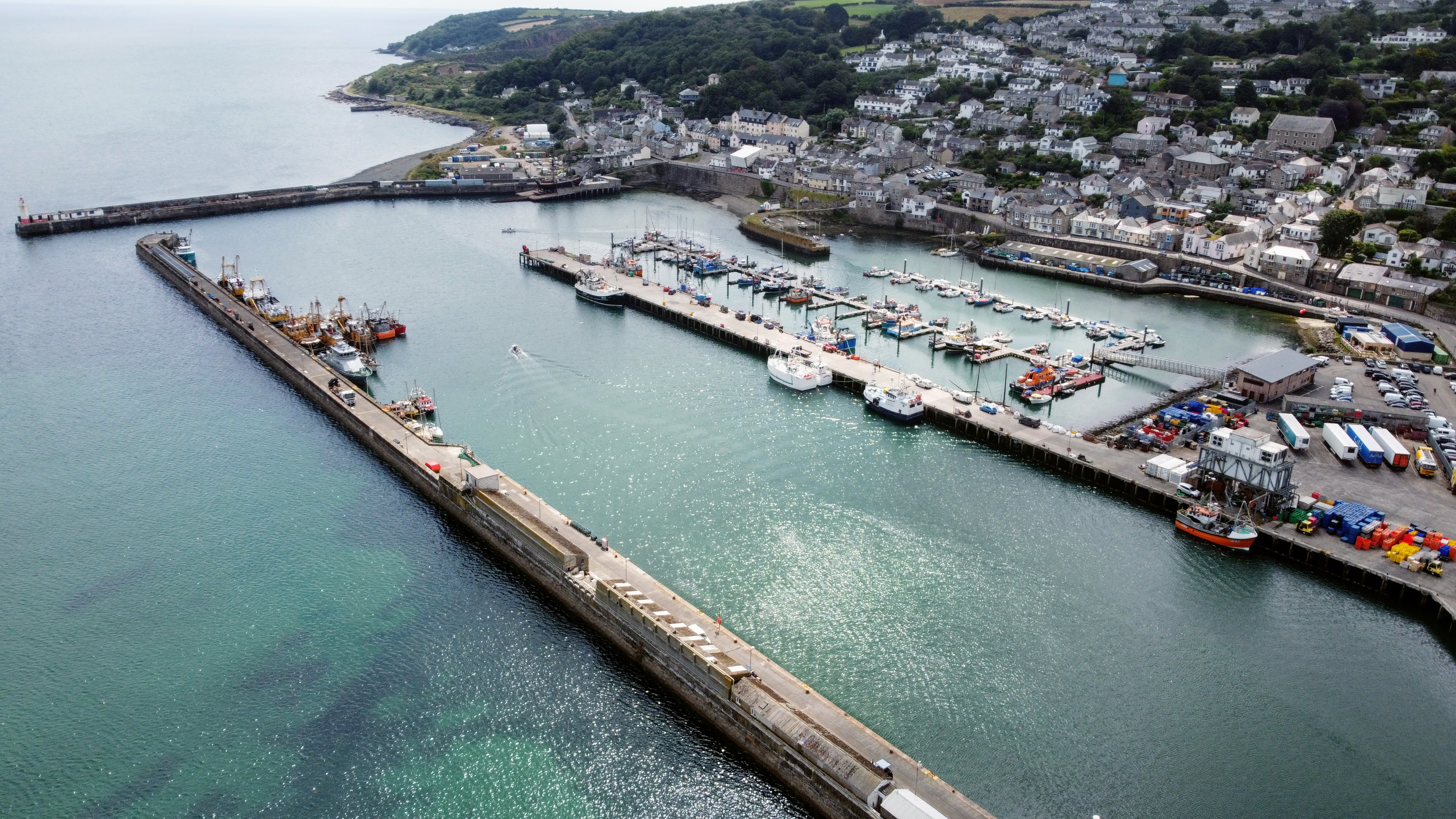
Aerial view of Newlyn Harbour

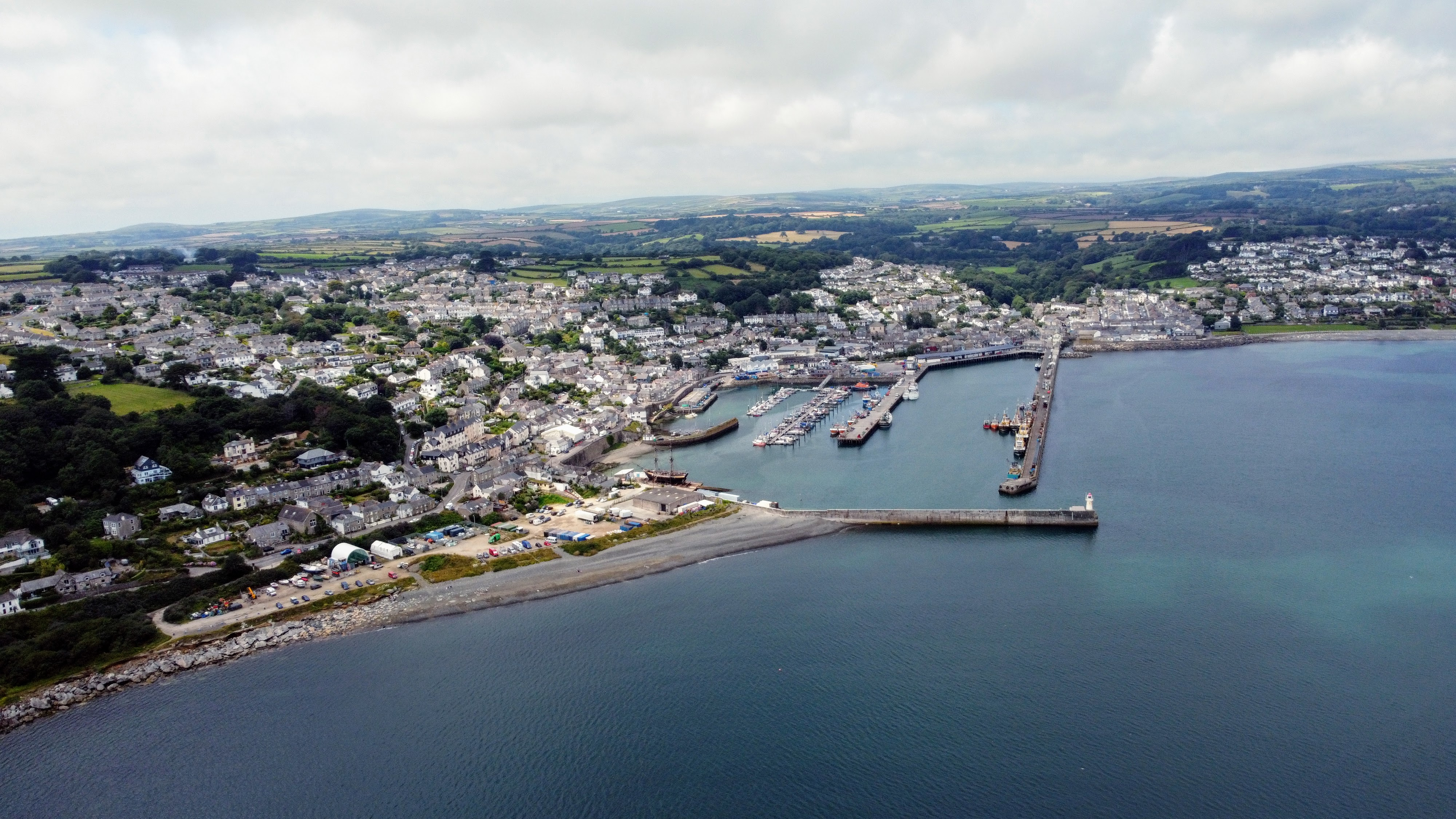
Distant view of Newlyn Harbour

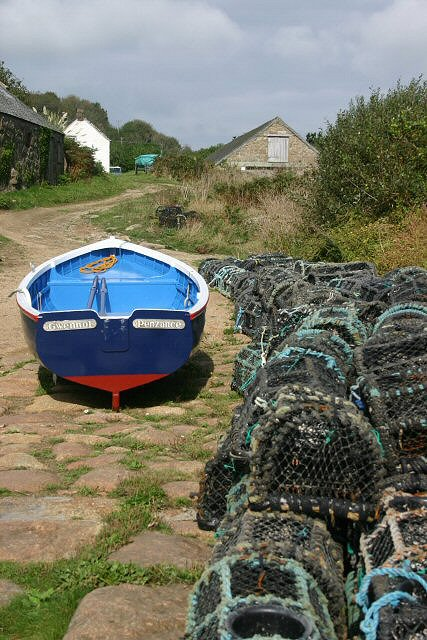
A boat and lobster pots at Penberth Cove

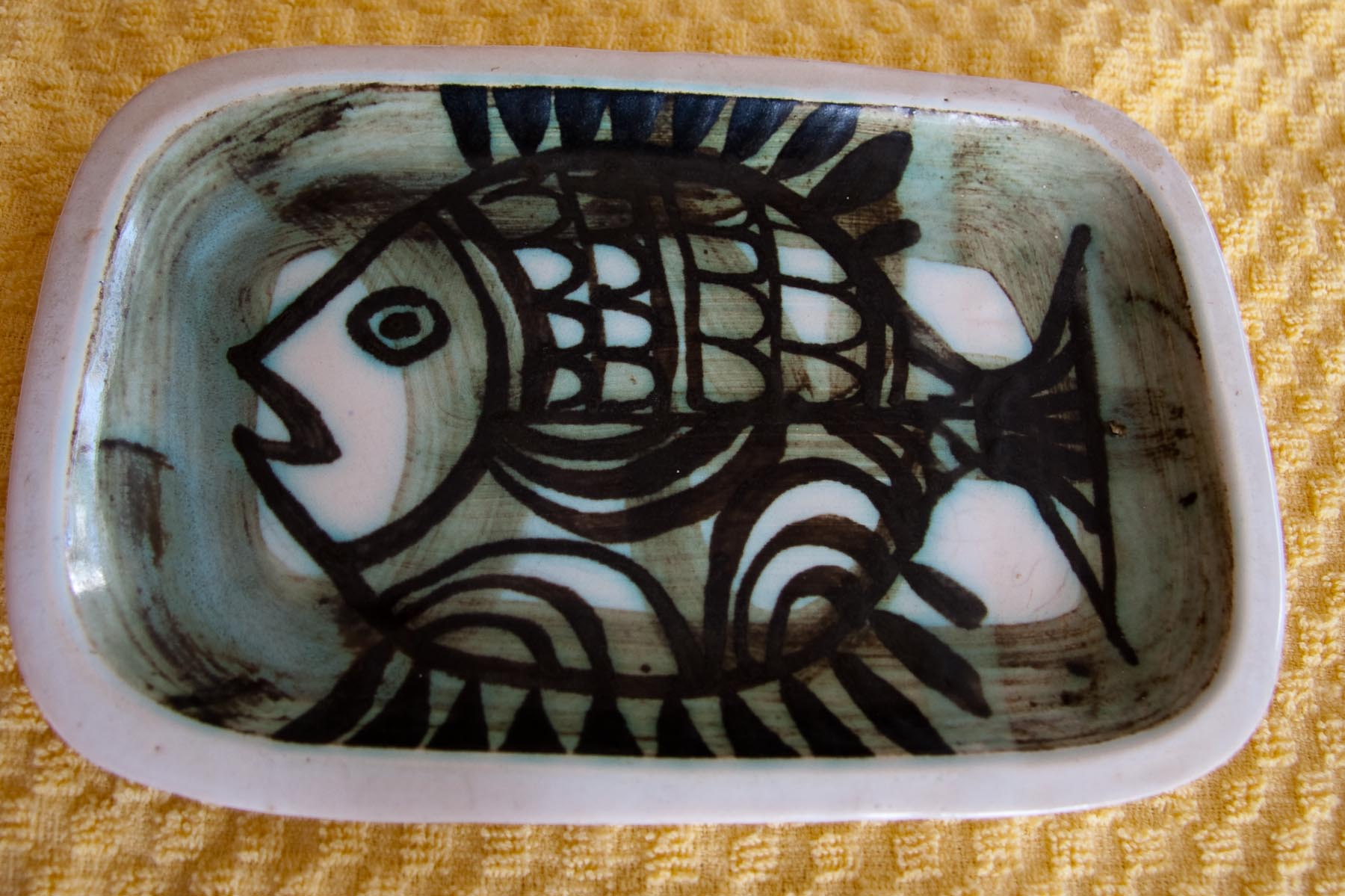
A Tremaen pottery fish dish (dishes decorated with hand-painted fish were made at the pottery)
