= Peter Pye =

Peter Pye (1902 – 3 September 1966), Dr Edward Arthur (Peter) Pye. MRCS, LRCP, was a British yachtsman, author and doctor.

Peter Pye was educated at Epsom College, then Trinity College, Cambridge and St George's Hospital, London. He married Dorothy Neville in London in 1928, but they were separated after three years, leaving one son, Patrick Pye, who was raised by his mother in Dublin.

Edward Arthur Pye was the son of Harry Pye and Annette O'Leary, the former being a wine merchant and amateur sailor and son of Kellow Pye, and the latter being a daughter of Arthur O'Leary (composer), Professor of Piano at the Royal Academy of Music, originally from Tralee in County Kerry.

After qualifying as an MD, Pye worked as a G.P. in Ealing, West London. In the early 1930s, Pye and his wife Anne (married in 1936) bought a 30 ft Polperro Gaffer fishing vessel built by Ferris of Looe called Lily for £25. They converted the boat, which had been built in 1896, to a sea-going cutter and renamed her Moonraker of Fowey. Together they cruised the boat extensively on annual holidays, sailing out of Fambridge, Essex.

In 1946, at the age of 44, Pye retired from medicine to concentrate on sailing full-time. The decision was the combined result of being unhappy with the prospect of the nationalisation of the British health system and the serendipitous encounter with a book that was to change his life. The book, £200 Millionaire, by British sailor Weston Martyr, was an account of the low cost life an itinerant yachtsman could enjoy.

Peter and Anne sailed around the world for the next twenty years, demonstrating that 'log, line and lookout' were more important to a life at sea than any number of modern gadgets. He financed his journeys through lecturing and writing books, which were published by Rupert Hart-Davis. Pye, alongside US photographer, journalist and yachtsman Carleton Mitchell, has been said to symbolise a key change in the history of yachting in the West Indies. Both were amateur sailors who cruised the Caribbean after World War II in small boats, and many followed in the wake of their voyages.

Red Mains’l covers his voyage to Portugal, Madeira, the West Indies, Florida, the Azores and back. While The Sea is for Sailing takes Moonraker from Fowey to the Caribbean, through the Panama Canal and across the Pacific to the Marquesas and Hawaii, to British Columbia and back home.

He died, aged 64, from the effects of contaminated nitrous oxide during a hospital operation at Plymouth General Hospital, (then Devonport Hospital) Plymouth.

== Works ==
- Red Mains’l, 1952,
- The Sea is for Sailing, 1957
- A Sail in a Forest, 1961
- The Sea is King
- Backdoor to Brazil
