= Agnes Clune Quinlan =

Irish composer (1873–1949)

Agnes Clune Quinlan (20 September 1873 – 21 May 1949) was an Irish composer, lecturer and pianist who wrote Gaelic-influenced music for piano and voice and recorded commercially as a pianist. She moved to America and died in Philadelphia.

Quinlan was born in Limerick, Ireland. She studied music at the Royal Academy of Music in London, where her teachers included Henry Davenport, Frederick Eyres, and Arthur O’Leary. She was awarded medals by the Royal Academy of Music and by the Society of Arts, both in London.

Quinlan traveled to New York in 1895 and in 1900 was living at the Convent of the Holy Child Jesus in Delaware, Pennsylvania. In addition to composing, she was listed as a speaker with The Lecture Guild in New York City. She gave lecture recitals on various musical topics, including weekly talks on Philadelphia Orchestra programs during its winter season, and a lecture on ancient music and musical instruments of Ireland. With Katherine Bregy, she gave a lecture recital on modern French music and poetry. She wrote at least one article for The Etude entitled The Music of Ireland.

As a pianist, Quinlan made several trial recordings for the Victor Talking Machine Company (later RCA Victor), and one commercial recording, B-25939. She also served as the accompanist for the Mendelssohn Club of Germantown, Pennsylvania.

Quinlan taught at Sharon Hill Academy, the Ogontz School, the Ursuline Academy in Wilmington, Delaware, and at the Catholic Suminer School in Cliff Haven, New York. Her compositions were published by Theodore Presser Company and Oliver Ditson. They included:

== Piano ==
- Reverie

== Vocal ==
- “April in Killarney” (text by Perrin H. Lowrey)
- “Far Away From Ireland”
- Fifteen Hymns for Use in the Catholic Church
- “I Know a Lovely Island”
- “In Absence”
- “Irish Song”
- “Kinnegad”
- “Legend of Wicklow”
- “Love in a Garden”
- “March 17”
- “My Lad-O”
- “Near the Well”
- “One Little Bunch of Heather”
- “Over the Hills to Mary”
- “Young Rose” (text by Thomas Moore)
