= Polperro Gaffer =

Cornish fishing vessel

The Polperro Gaffer is a type of fishing vessel used in Cornwall. The Great Gale of 1891 destroyed the fishing fleets of many of the smaller Cornish villages. The old boats were generally clinker-planked and lug-rigged. The new boats built after the Gale with government intervention and support were to a new design, carvel planked and with the "modern" gaff rig, boats we now know as typically West Country with straight stem and transom sterns though the lines varied from port to port.

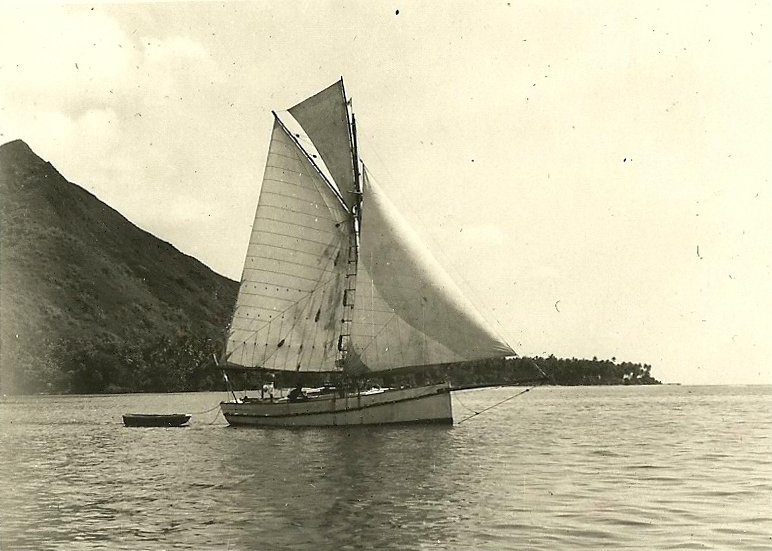
Moonraker, the famous Polperro Gaffer owned by Peter and Anne Pye, in Honolulu in July 1953

== Polperro fleet ==
The little fishing port of Polperro, 5 miles west of Looe had a fleet of small sailing fishing boats known as Polperro Gaffers. Their principal catch was the pilchard but this was a late summer catch and the rest of the year they set long lines, and seine nets. Most were built in Looe, around 26' with a deep 6' draft, a gaff rig on a pole mast stepped on the keel and they dried out on legs in Polperro's drying harbour.

== Similar vessels ==
The Plymouth Hooker was very similar and the only surviving sailing fishing boats still working, the Falmouth Oyster Boats are almost the same in hull design.

== Design ==
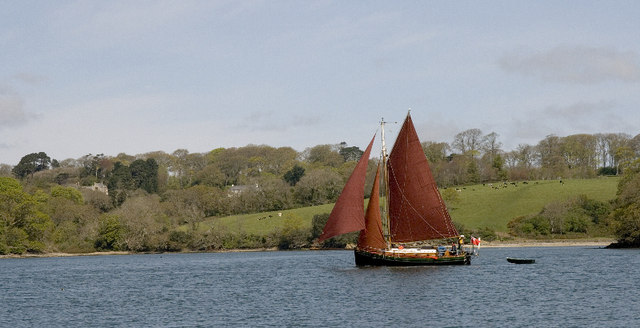
A gaffer in Channals Creek

The Polperro Gaffer and the Plymouth Hooker were essentially open boats with a fore deck back to the mast, a small aft deck and narrow side decks or waterways. The "cock-pit" was divided into the fish hold where the catch was carried and the net hold where the long seine nets were carried with a wooden roller athwartships to feed the net in and out. It was not uncommon for the boats to have a couple of berths in the fore peak cabin.

== Sails ==
The rig was deliberately low as it had to be handled by a small crew in all weathers and they would lie to the nets with mainsail set. However the sail area could be extended by setting a large topsail on a yard making these boats remarkably fast in races on high days and holidays.

== Moonraker ==
These boats have excellent sea-keeping capability as witnessed by Dr Peter Pye who with his wife sailed his Polperro Gaffer Moonraker round the world in the 1940s.
