= Patrick Pye =

British painter

Patrick Pye RHA (1929 – 8 February 2018) was a painter and stained glass artist, resident in County Dublin.

Pye was born in Winchester, England. He died in Dublin, Ireland.

== Career ==
Major commissions can be seen across Ireland. In 1999 a retrospective of his work was exhibited by the Royal Hibernian Academy. He is a founding member of Aosdána.

He has been described as "the most important creative artist in the sphere of religious thought in Ireland in our time".

The poet Michael Longley described the way Pye was treated in the last year of his life as "crass, unforgivably crass".

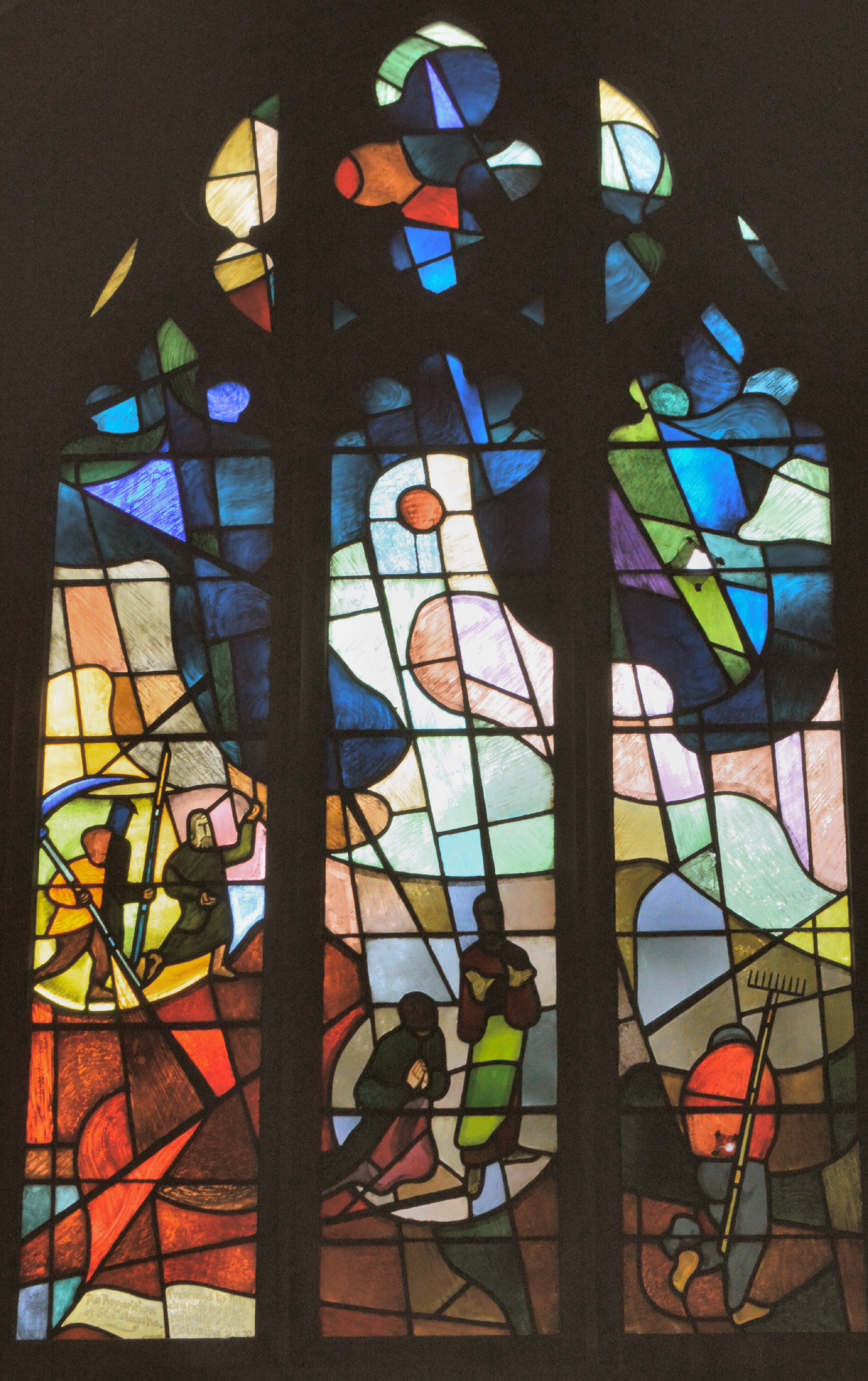
Dulwich, St Thomas More Church, Apparition of St Columba by Patrick Pye
