= St Columb Major (electoral division) =

Former electoral division of Cornwall in the UK

- Former ward Cornwall Council
- Boundary of St Columb Major in Cornwall from 2013-2021.
- County: Cornwall

2013–2021
- Number of councillors: One
- Replaced by: St Columb Major, St Mawgan and St Wenn
- Created from: St Columb

St Columb Major (Cornish: Sen Kolom Veur) was an electoral division of Cornwall in the United Kingdom which returned one member to sit on Cornwall Council from 2013 to 2021. It was abolished at the 2021 local elections, being succeeded by St Columb Major, St Mawgan and St Wenn.

== Councillors ==
Election	Member	Party
2013	Pat Harvey	Independent
2017	Paul Wills	Independent
2021	Seat abolished	

== Extent ==
St Columb Major covered the town of St Columb Major, the villages of Ruthvoes, Talskiddy, Tregonetha and St Wenn, and the hamlets of Trebudannon, Tregaswith, Trekenning, Tregatillian, Gluvian, Winnard's Perch and Rosenannon. The hamlet of Black Cross was shared with the St Enoder division. The division covered 6350 hectares in total.

== Election results ==
=== 2017 election ===
2017 election: St Columb Major
Party	Candidate	Votes	%	±%
Independent	Paul Wills	862	64.6	
Conservative	John Bell	365	27.3	
Liberal Democrats	Jack Dixon	100	7.5	
Majority		497	37.2	
Rejected ballots		8	0.6	
Turnout		1335	36.2	
Independent gain from Independent		Swing		

=== 2013 election ===
2013 election: St Columb Major
Party	Candidate	Votes	%	±%
Independent	Pat Harvey	586	55.0	
Conservative	John Bell	204	19.2	
Liberal Democrats	Alvin Martin	193	18.1	
Labour	Debbie Hopkins	77	7.2	
Majority		382	35.9	
Rejected ballots		5	0.5	
Turnout		1065	28.4	
Independent win (new seat)				
