= River Menalhyl =

River in Cornwall, England

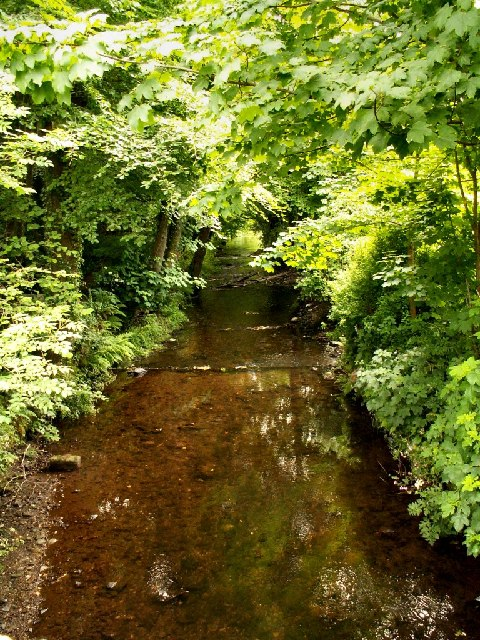
- River Menalhyl at St Columb Major
- Native name: Dowr Melynheyl (Cornish)

Location
- Country: England
- Region: Cornwall

Physical characteristics
- Source
  - location: Nine Maidens
  - coordinates: 50°28′15″N 4°54′36″W
  - elevation: 150 m (490 ft)
- Mouth
  - location: Mawgan Porth, Celtic Sea
  - coordinates: 50°28′0″N 5°2′0″W
- Length: 19 km (12 mi)

The River Menalhyl (Cornish: Dowr Melynheyl, meaning river of the estuary mill) is a river in Cornwall, England, that flows through the civil parishes of St Columb Major and Mawgan-in-Pydar. Its length is about 12 miles and it flows in a generally north-west direction. The name comes from the Cornish words melyn meaning mill and heyl meaning estuary - estuary mills. The name was recorded as Mellynheyl in the 19th century, but it had been known as Glyvion.

== Sources ==
The source of the river's longest branch is near Nine Maidens, about 2 miles to the north of St Columb,50.447°N 4.943°W, at a height of approximately 490 feet above mean sea level. The Menalhyl enters the sea at Mawgan Porth on the north coast of the county, 50.465°N 5.027°W.

== Tributaries ==
Tributaries to the river include one that rises between the village of Tregonetha and Castle an Dinas, and one whose source is south-east of Tregatillian. A smaller river, from Talskiddy, joins the Menalhyl a short distance from its mouth.

The river flows through the settlements of St Columb (the north part of the town, known as Bridge), St Mawgan and Mawgan Porth. Its valley, from St Columb downstream, is called the Vale of Lanherne; it is wooded for much of its length and is popular with walkers.

== Mills ==
There are a small number of disused mills along the length of the Menalhyl, and the river feeds some small lakes and ponds. It is also used for agricultural purposes along most of its course. Lawry's Mill was a tourist attraction in Victorian times and many postcards were produced featuring the Mill.

== Fishing ==
The river is fished by anglers, especially in its lower course, and fish species such as brown trout, sea trout, lamprey, eel and minnow have been recorded.

== Geology ==
The bedrock of the catchment area largely consists of Devonian calcareous slates, grits and limestone.

- Media related to River Menalhyl at Wikimedia Commons
