= St Columb Green Book =

16th century manuscript of parish records

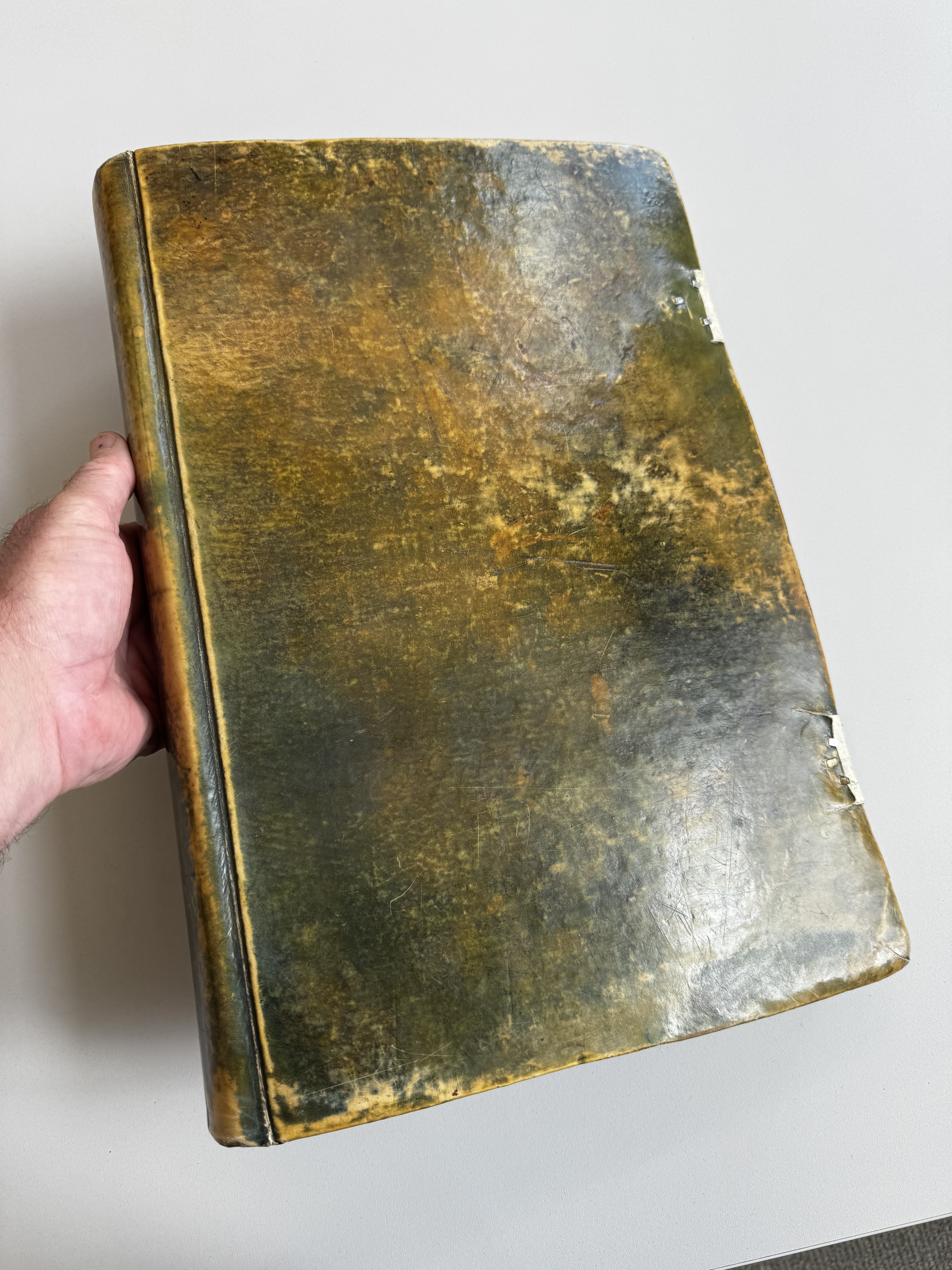
Photograph of the historic St Columb Green Book, a parish record from St Columb Major, Cornwall.

St Columb Green Book is a very rare 16th century handwritten manuscript, bound in green leather detailing the parish records of St Columb Major, Cornwall. It was kept with a few intermissions from 1585 onwards. It gives a rare glimpse in day-to-day life in 16th-century Cornwall. The original is very fragile and is now kept at the Kresen Kernow. A reprint of selected passages was published in 1912 by Thurstan Peter, in a Supplement to the Journal of Royal Institution of Cornwall, vol. 19.

The book, dating back to Elizabethan times, covers only the Parish of St Columb Major. It is important as it contains one of the earliest references to Morris dancing in the United Kingdom. Another entry gives the earliest written reference to the ancient sport of Cornish Hurling Also contained is an early reference to Robin Hood plays that existed in Cornwall.

== Extracts of note ==
- 1585: (Early evidence of Morris dancing) coats for dancers, a friars coat, 24 dancing bells, a streamer of red mocaddo and lockram, 6 yards of white woolen cloth
- 1588 (In the year of the Armada) - Stock of money for the trayned (sic) soldiers
- 1589 Rec. for the lont of Robbyn Hood clothes
- 1593 Parish Carriage available for hire. Built by Remfray Rowse and Harry Hawke
- 1595 'sylver ball gylt' (earliest record of the Hurling game at St Columb which still exists)
- 1678: ffor ye burying of Peter the son of Sir John SeyntAubyn 13s 4d
- 1715: Pd Mr Robert Creeper in full for transcribing the Kings Letter £2 10s
