= Cornish hurling =

Outdoor team game from Cornwall, England

Former Pub sign at St Columb Major

Hurling (Cornish: Hurlian) is an outdoor team game played only in Cornwall, England, played with a small silver ball. While the sport shares its name with the Irish game of hurling, the two sports are completely different.

Once played widely in Cornwall, the game has similarities to other traditional football or inter parish 'mob' games played in various parts of Britain, but certain attributes make hurling unique to Cornwall. It is considered by many to be Cornwall's national game along with Cornish wrestling. An old saying in the Cornish language goes "hyrlîan yw gen gwaré nyi", which means "hurling is our sport".

Today the sport survives only in two communities: St Columb Major, where the traditional hurling matches are played on Shrove Tuesday and the second Saturday following, between the Townsmen and the Countrymen of the parish; and in St Ives, where a hurling game is played by children on Feast Monday. In addition, a version of hurling features in the beating of the bounds festivities at Bodmin roughly every five years. Although the custom attracts fewer spectators, the annual hurling matches at St Columb Major have similar status in the Cornish calendar to the 'Obby 'Oss festival at Padstow and the Furry Dance at Helston in that all three are unique customs that have survived unchanged and have taken place annually since before records began.

== Ball ==
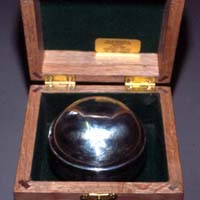
A St Columb ball, 1995

Typically, the outer shell of a hurling ball is sterling silver which is hammered into two hemispheres and then bound around a core of applewood, held together with screws or nails through a band of silver. The balls used in the St Columb games were crafted for a few years by John Turver, but since the 1990s new balls have been made by local craftsman Colin Rescorla. At St Columb the winner of the ball has the right to keep it, but must have a new one made in its place for the next game. The price of a new ball is said to be around £1,000, depending on the price of silver at the time. The current inscription on the St Columb ball is "Town and Country, do your best", which derives from the motto: "Town and Country do your best, for in this parish I must rest".

=== Size and weight ===
There is no definitive size or weight for St Columb hurling balls, which are handmade; the weight is typically 19 to 21 ounces (~ 570 grams), and they are about 9 inches or 23 cm in circumference, similar to a cricket ball. Given its weight and hardness, hurlers and spectators maintain intense vigilance to avoid serious injury from a long or poorly aimed throw.

=== Hurling balls on public display ===
There are examples of hurling balls on public display at Truro Museum, Lanhydrock House, St Ives Museum, St Agnes Museum and St Columb Major Town Hall. Many are also held in private hands. One held at Penzance Museum is thought to be very old and bears the following inscription in the Cornish language: "Paul Tuz whek Gwaro Tek heb ate buz Henwis. 1704". The first two words signify "Men of Paul", i.e., the owners of the ball. The last seven words may be translated literally (retaining the word order of the engraving) into English as "sweet play fair without hate to be called", which may be roughly translated as "fair play is good play".

A 1990s St Columb hurling ball is on display at the National Football Museum in Manchester, as part of a collection of exhibits relating to the development of modern football codes from medieval football and other traditional games such as hurling.

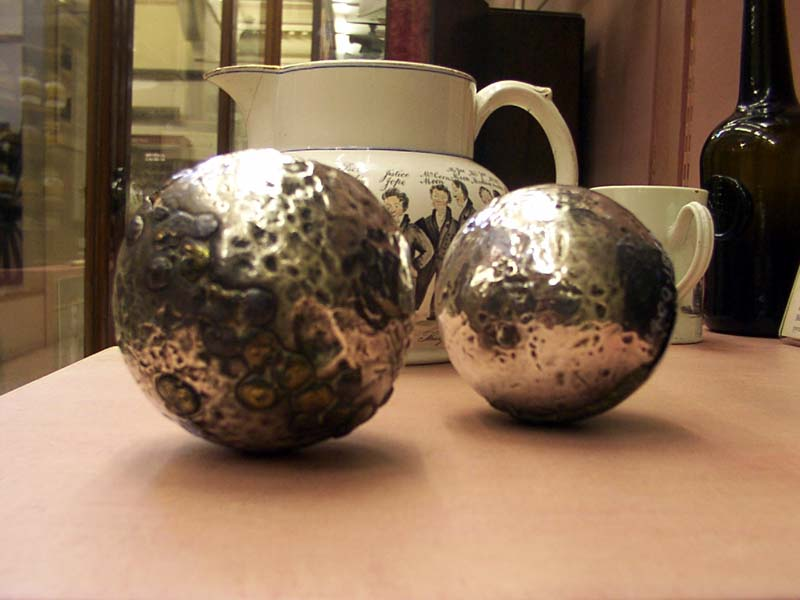
Hurling balls in Truro Museum

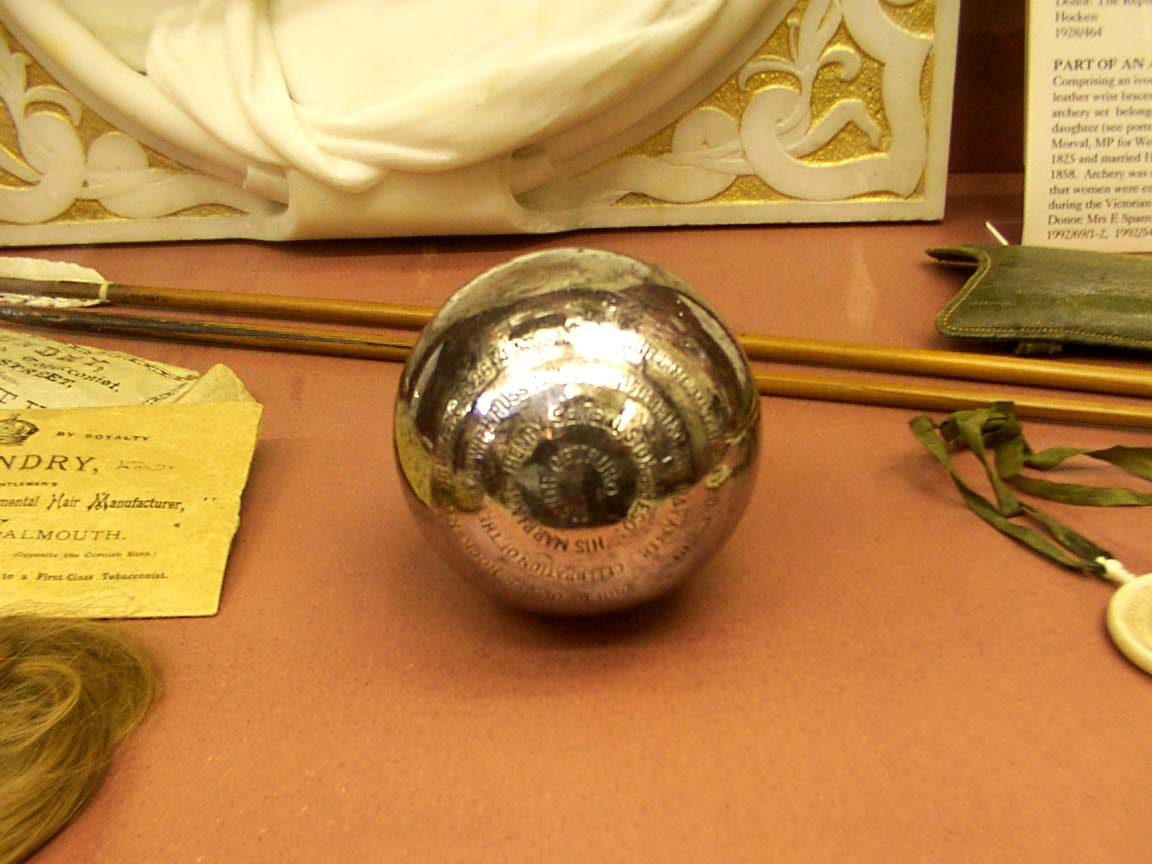
Hurling ball used at Truro

== History ==
Little is recorded of the sport until about the 16th century when contests were generally between groups of men from two parishes. At this point there were two forms of the game, according to Carew's Survey of Cornwall (1602). "Hurling to goals" was played on a pitch similar to that of modern-day association football, and had many strict rules, similar to those of football and rugby; this was common in the east of the county. "Hurling to country", however, was often played over large areas of countryside and despite its name also involved goals; this was common in the west of the county. This had few rules and was more similar to the St Columb game of modern times (see below). Inter-parish matches died out towards the end of the 18th century but matches between different sections of the same township continued. At St Ives those named Tom, Will and John formed a team to play against those with other names on the Monday after Quadragesima. At Truro a team of married men played against a team of bachelors, and at Helston the men of two particular streets played against the men of the others. The field of the St Ives game has been changed twice, first to the beach, and in 1939 to the public park.

In August, 1705, a fatality occurred during a hurling match at Camborne. The parish burials register contains the following entry 'William Trevarthen buried in the church. "Being disstroid to a hurling with Redruth men at the high dounes the 10th day of August". This is the only recorded death of a player during a hurling match.

=== Possible origins ===
Hurling is very similar to the game of cnapan; a form of medieval football played until the nineteenth century in the southwestern counties of Wales, especially Carmarthenshire, Ceredigion and Pembrokeshire. George Owen of Henllys (1552–1613) believed cnapan was played by the Celtic Britons. There is circumstantial evidence to support this claim. The Cornish, Welsh and Bretons of Brittany are historically descended from Romano-Britons who inhabited the Roman province of Britannia before the Anglo-Saxons incursions from the 5th century.

In Brittany, Normandy and Picardy a comparable game is known as la soule or choule. The earliest recorded game of Soule comes from Cornwall. Court records from 1283 show an entry in the plea rolls (No. 111) providing details of legal action taken when a man called Roger was accused of killing a fellow Soule player with a stone. (Medieval Cornwall by Leonard Elliott Elliott-Binns).

Considering the clear similarities between Hyrlîan, Cnapan and La Soule, the common Brittonic languages, shared culture and ancestry it is likely these three sports evolved from the same game. The Romans are known to have played a ball game containing physical aspects of these sports called Harpastum. There is no hard evidence Harpastum continued to be played in Europe after the Western Roman Empire fell into decline although an alternative form was revived as Calcio Fiorentino during the renaissance in 16th century Tuscany. The Orkney 'Ba' Game', which has been played on Christmas Eve and Hogmanay every year since the mid-19th century, has some similarity to Cornish Hurling.

=== Early written evidence of hurling in Cornwall ===
- c. 1584, topographer John Norden, who visited Cornwall, writes:

The Cornish-men they are stronge, hardye and nymble, so are their exercises violent, two especially, Wrastling and Hurling, sharpe and seuere actiuties; and in neither of theis doth any Countrye exceede or equall them. The firste is violent, but the seconde is daungerous: The firste is acted in two sortes, by Holdster (as they called it) and by the Coller; the seconde likewise two ways, as Hurling to goales, and Hurling to the Countrye.

- c. 1590, poet Michael Drayton, in his work Poly-Olbion, writes on Cornish hurling:

According to the law, or when the ball to throw;
And drive it to the gole, in squadrons forth they goe;
And to avoid the troupes (their forces that forlay);
Through dykes and rivers make, in the rubustious play;

- 1595, mention of a 'sylver ball gylt' in the St Columb Green Book
- 1602, in his survey of Cornwall, historian Richard Carew writes about Cornish hurling. The rule about no forward passing applied to only one of the two historic forms of hurling, and still applies to the modern sport of rugby.

That the hurler must deal no foreball, or throw it to any partner standing nearer the goal than himself. In dealing the ball, if any of the adverse party can catch it flying ... the property of it is thereby transferred to the catching party; and so assailants become defendants, and defendant assailants.

- 1648, at Penryn: following a Royalist uprising to support the King, the victorious Parliamentarians passed through the town in a triumphant manner with three soldiers, bearing on the points of three swords (carried upright), three silver balls used in hurling.
- 1654, at Hyde Park, London: The Lord Protector, (Oliver Cromwell) however, was present on that May-day, and appeared keenly to enjoy the sports, as we learn from another source. In company with many of his Privy Council he watched a great hurling match by fifty Cornish gentlemen against fifty others. "The ball they played withal was silver, and designed for that party which did win the goal." Report in the Moderate Intell. 26 April – 4 May 1654
- 1705, Thomas Boson wrote an inscription in the Cornish Language prepared for William Gwavas' silver hurling ball, at Paul, Cornwall.

An pelle arrance ma.
An pelle Arrance ma ve resse,
gen mere Hurleyey, Creve ha brosse
Do Wella Gwavas an Deane gentle
an kensa journa a messe Heddra an Centle
en Plew Pawle, in Cernow Teage
an Blooth Creste an Arleuth whege
Meele Sith Cans ha hanter Deege

This Silver bale was given
With many Hurlers Stronge & greet
To William Gwavas gent.
the first day of September was the tyme
in the parish of paule in Cornwall faire
in the year of our Sweete Lord Christe
a thousand seven hundred & the half of ten (vis) fiue.

- 1707, the Cornish saying "hyrlîan yw gen gwaré nyi" ("Hurling is our sport") was published in Archaeologia Britannica, by Edward Lhuyd.

=== Modern survival of the game ===
Up until the 19th century, the game was still relatively common, with many Cornish towns and villages holding a match on feast and fare days, and games between St Columb Major and Newquay survived into the early 1900s. The town of Helston used to hold a hurl following the 'beating of the bounds', but the tradition there died out in the early 20th century.

The matches at St Columb and St Ives, and the game played as part of the beating the bounds ceremony at Bodmin are the only instances of the sport today.

== St Columb Hurling ==
The traditional St Columb Major hurling matches take place on Shrove Tuesday and the Saturday 11 days later; the sport has been played at St Columb on those dates since before records began. The usually rough game is played on the town's streets and the surrounding countryside, between two teams: the Townsmen (who live in St Columb town) and the Countrymen (who live in the rest of the parish).

=== Aim ===
The aim of the game is either to goal the ball or carry it across the parish boundary; accomplishing either of these feats wins the match. There are two goals (one for each team) both about a mile (1.6 km) from Market Square, the game's starting point, whilst the parish boundary varies between 1.5 and 3 miles (2.4 to 4.8 km) from the starting point. Gameplay involves controlling possession by running with the ball, passing, throwing, snatching, tackling and scrummaging.

=== Commencement ===
Proceedings begin at 4:15 pm in Market Square, when the ball is "called-up" by the hurler who won it for his team in the previous game. The hurl starts 15 minutes later at 4:30 pm with the "throw-up", which is performed by a person chosen by the said previous winner. They climb a stepladder and recite the traditional rhyme "Town and Country do your best, for in this parish I must rest", call for three cheers and throw the ball to the crowd.

=== Gameplay ===
The initial phase of the game takes place in the main streets of the town and generally lasts for up to an hour; most of this period is non-competitive and the two teams are somewhat irrelevant: townsmen pass the ball to countrymen and vice versa, whilst the tackles and scrums that occur are generally for amusement only. Play often stops for spectators to touch the ball (said to bring luck and fertility), or slows to allow younger players to participate. Hurling in the town consists of a variety of action: hurlers run through the streets, passing the ball between them, whilst tackles and scuffles for possession often become larger scrummages involving several men and sometimes lasting several minutes. In this period, most of the action takes place in Fore Street and Fair Street, with occasional forays into some of the side streets and the Recreation Ground.

At some point, usually after 40–60 minutes of play in the town, a single hurler or group of team-mates with possession of the ball will make an attempt towards their team's goal or to part of the parish boundary. Their choice of destination will largely depend on where they are in the town when they gain possession of the ball; although the routes to the goals are shorter, often a route to the boundary is more feasible. From this point on the two sides strive for possession, and the actual Town against Country hurling may take place. Some hurls are won by a team effort, while sometimes a single hurler, if a good runner, may attain possession of the ball in the town and manage to run all the way to the goal or boundary without being caught by any of the opposition. The hurlers can go anywhere in the parish: sometimes play keeps to roads, though often players go through fields and sometimes woods and farmyards, when necessary scrambling over hedges and ditches and wading through rivers.

A quick, unchallenged run to one of the goals or a close part of the boundary can take less than 10 minutes, whilst a hard-fought hurl with several tackles and scrums, especially to a more distant part of the boundary, will last longer, sometimes 30 minutes or more after leaving the town. Due to the pace of the game, this latter stage usually involves only a small number of hurlers, fit enough to keep up with those in possession of the ball. Spectators rarely witness any hurling action in the concluding stage of the game.

=== Conclusion and winning ===
The match ends when the ball is placed in a goal or carried over the boundary. The hurler who does this is termed the "winner of the ball" and his team wins the match. The hurlers then walk back to the town, and once in the main streets, the winner of the ball is carried on the shoulders of two team-mates back to Market Square, while members of the victorious team sing the hurling song:

For we roll, we roll, the [Town/Country] Ball we roll
And we roll, we roll, the [Town/Country] Ball we roll
And we roll, we roll, the [Town/Country] Ball we roll
And we all go marching home.

Each rendition of the song is followed by the winner "calling-up" the ball, which involves three cheers followed by his declaring "Town Ball" or "Country Ball" as appropriate, to further cheers by the winning side. The song and call-up are repeated until the hurlers reach Market Square, where the ball is called-up a final time before the hurlers disperse. Usually this will have taken place sometime between 5:30 pm and 6:30 pm unless the hurl and return walk were unusually long.

Fitness and running ability are significant factors in hurling: strong runners are the most likely to be involved in the latter stage of the game and to win the ball. Some such hurlers have done so several times; the most prolific on record is Michael Weldhen, who won the ball 17 times for the Country between 1953 and 1982. Several hurlers have won the ball more than once.

=== Evening ===
At 8:00 pm, the winner of the ball returns to Market Square to call-up the ball again. This is followed by a visit to each of St Columb's public houses, where the ball is immersed in gallon jugs filled with beer. Each gallon will be called up by a member of the winning side, announcing who has paid for it, and the "silver beer", as it is known, is shared amongst those present. Often the winner of the ball is carried into each pub in the same manner as at the conclusion of the game.

=== Field of play, goals and the boundary ===
The field of play is considered to be the whole parish of St Columb Major, since if the ball leaves the parish, the game is won. The 1979 edition of the Guinness Book of World Records notes:

The largest pitch of any ball game is that of polo, with 12.4 acres… Twice a year in the Parish of St Columb Major, Cornwall, England, a game called hurling (not to be confused with the Irish game) is played on a "pitch" which consists of the entire Parish, approximately 25 square miles (64.7km^{2}).

Although a boundary change in the 1980s reduced the size of the parish to about 17.2 square miles.

The parish is mainly farmland, but includes woodland, marshy ground and small areas of water, as well as several hamlets, villages and farmsteads, and both major and minor roads. St Columb town occupies a small proportion of the area of the parish and sits just to the west of its centre.

The first phase of the game takes place mostly in the town's main streets which are still open to traffic (although police advise motorists not to drive through). The game can also extend onto private property including gardens and sometimes through houses or pubs. The second phase (wherein the hurlers are aiming to carry the ball to a goal or part of the parish boundary) can go anywhere in the parish: sometimes play keeps to roads, though often hurlers go through fields, rivers, woods and farmyards, and encountering obstacles such as hedges, ditches and barbed wire fences.

There are two goals, both shallow granite troughs positioned outside the town. The Town Goal is the base of an old Celtic cross and is situated just south-west of St Columb at Cross Putty, the junction with the A3059 road to Newquay, while the Country Goal is located to the north-east of the town, near the hamlet of Lanhainsworth.

The parish boundary is irregular in shape; the closest parts of it to the town are about 1.5 miles (2.4 km) away, while the farthest points are about 3 miles (4.8 km) distant. There are certain routes to the parish boundary that are popular due to being comparatively short, such as running west down the Vale of Lanherne into St Mawgan parish near Nanskeval.

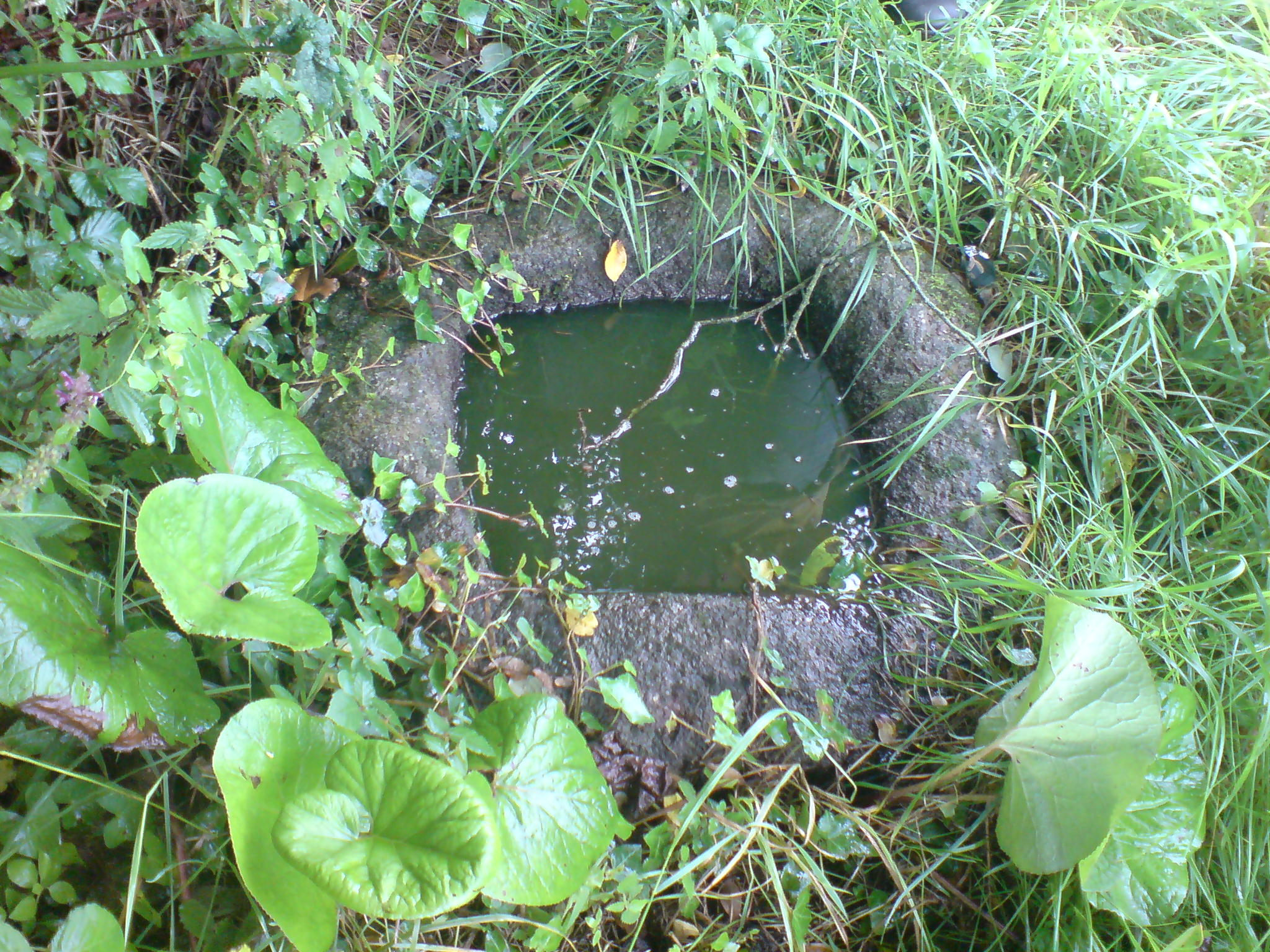
The Town Goal

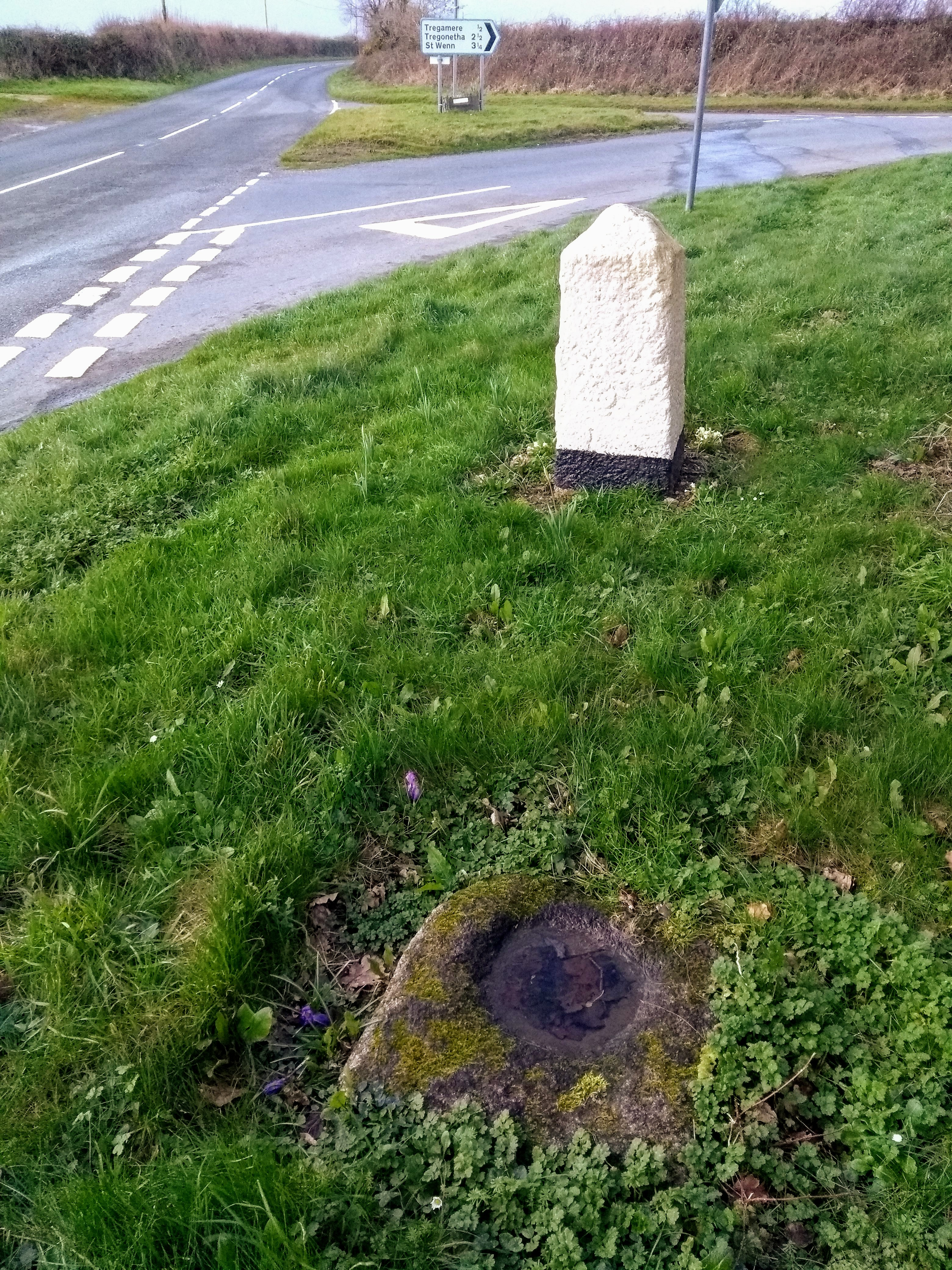
The Country Goal, with milestone behind

=== Rules and organisation ===
There are no referees, no written rules and no organising committee or authority of any kind. There are, however, certain acts that are generally accepted as being wrong, such as hiding the ball (unless in jest), excessive violence and using any form of transport other than foot. Furthermore, there are points of etiquette that are generally observed. For example, during the hurl in the town, if a hurler holds the ball aloft it signals that he intends to give it to a spectator to hold, and other hurlers refrain from tackling him. An act that is widely disapproved of but not considered illegal is to make a particularly early attempt to carry-off the ball to the goal or boundary.

Occasional disputes are generally resolved by the hurlers that happen to be present at the time, as there is no referee or higher authority.

The hurler who wins the ball for his team is the custodian of it until the next hurl. He has the right to keep it in perpetuity, but to do so he must pay for a new one to be made for the next game.

=== Teams ===
The Townsmen are men who live in St Columb Major town, whilst their opponents, the Countrymen, are those who live in the rural parts of the parish – this includes villages and hamlets such as Talskiddy, Trebudannon, Ruthvoes and Tregatillian, as well as the farms and other rural dwellings of St Columb parish. Sometimes players from outside the parish play (particularly former St Columb residents) but they are not permitted to win the ball. Team allegiance is purely based on residence: if a hurler moves house from the town to the countryside (or vice versa) he changes sides accordingly. The border between the town and the country is undefined and there are some areas around parts of the outskirts of the town that may be considered either town or country.

There are no team captains, playing positions, or any form of team organisation, nor are there kits or any kind of player identification. Sometimes a hurler or hurlers might choose to station themselves in defence of the opponents' goal, particularly towards the latter stages of the hurl in the town, but because of the option of winning at the boundary, goal defence does not form a significant part of hurling tactics.

There are no limits to the number of participants, and the two teams have unequal numbers. The Town has the larger team since St Columb town has grown in size in the 20th and 21st century; before the mid-20th century the Countrymen were numerically stronger, mainly comprising the large numbers of men employed in agriculture in the past.

=== History ===
It is unknown how long the Shrovetide games at St Columb have been played, but it is believed to have been for many hundreds of years. The St Columb Green Book mentions a silver ball in 1595, although with no description of any game. Newspaper reports from the 1850s and 1860s describe St Columb's Shrovetide hurling as a long-established custom, and portray the essentials of the game in that era as fairly similar to that of the present day. A board erected in the Town Hall in 2000 lists all the winners of the ball since 1900.

=== Terminology ===
- break - often used to describe the act of taking the ball out of the town in an attempt to get to a goal or a boundary, i.e. "after 50 minutes of hurling in the town, a group of townsmen made a break towards their goal".
- call-up - to declare victory by holding the ball aloft, calling for three cheers followed by shouting "Town Ball" or "Country Ball" as appropriate, usually done by the winner of the ball.
- carry-off the ball - to win the ball.
- Country Ball - a win for the countrymen.
- deal the ball - to pass the ball. Also used as a request to an opponent to give up possession without being tackled.
- have the ball - to win the ball (less formal), i.e. "who had the ball on Shrove Tuesday?"
- holder of the ball - sometimes used to describe the previous winner, as he is the custodian of the ball until the next hurl.
- silver beer - beer served in the evening after the hurl, from gallon jugs in which the ball is immersed.
- shuffle the ball - to hide the ball (generally frowned upon – unless done in jest.)
- stand - to tackle.
- throw-up - the start of the game, performed by a person invited to do so by the previous winner of the ball.
- Town Ball - a win for the townsmen.
- winner of the ball - the hurler who goals the ball or carries it over the boundary to win the game for his team.

=== Local features relating to hurling ===
Several references to the tradition of hurling are found in St Columb Major:

- The parish badge is a hand holding a hurling ball, with the words "Town and Country do your best"; this is used by a number of local organisations such as the town council, the primary school and the football club.
- The name of the "Silver Ball" public house is a reference to the hurling ball. The pub sign includes a painting of hurling action.
- A large painting by local artist Dick Twinney celebrating the hurling tradition hangs in the town centre.
- A board listing all the winners of the ball since 1900 hangs in the Town Hall.
- Photographs of hurls over the last few decades are displayed in some of the town's pubs.
- The finial of the Town Hall bell turret is in the form of a hurling ball.

== Other present-day examples of the game ==
=== St. Ives (annually) ===
The annual St Ives hurling match happens on Feast Monday each February (the feast is on the Sunday nearest to 3 February). The game starts at 10.30am when the silver ball is thrown from the wall of the Parish Church by the Mayor to the crowd below on the beach. The ball is passed from one to another on the beach and then up into the streets of St. Ives. The person in possession of the ball when the clock strikes noon takes it to the Mayor at the Guildhall and receives the traditional reward of five shillings. At one time the game was played by the men of the village. These days it is played by the children.

=== Bodmin (roughly every 5 years) ===
Hurling survives as a traditional as part of Beating the bounds at Bodmin, commencing at the close of the 'Beat'. The game is organised by the Rotary Club of Bodmin. The game is started by the Mayor of Bodmin throwing a silver ball into a body of water known as the "Salting Pool". There are no teams and the hurl follows a set route. The aim is to carry the ball from the "Salting Pool" via the old A30, along Callywith Road, then through Castle Street, Church Square and Honey Street, to finish at the Turret Clock in Fore Street. The participant carrying the ball when it reaches the turret clock receives a £10 reward from the Mayor. The last Bodmin Hurl took place in March, 2015 following the beating the bounds, and is unlikely to take place again until 2020.

== The Hurlers stone circles ==
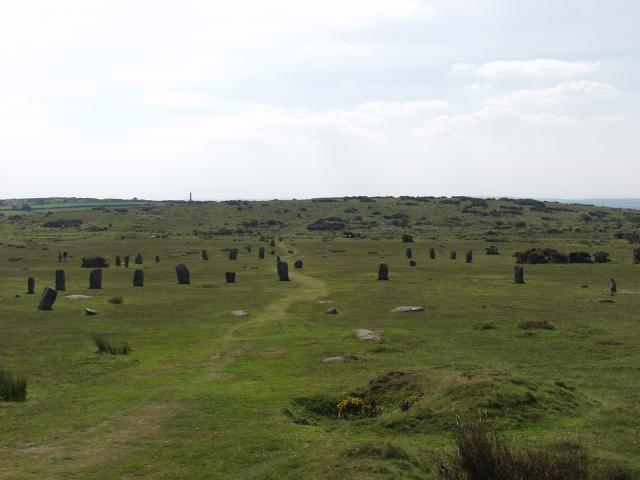
The Hurlers, looking south

On Craddock Moor, near Minions, are "The Hurlers". These consist of three separate Bronze Age stone circles with thirteen, seventeen and nine surviving stones. Local tradition maintains that they are men turned to stone for profaning the Lords Day by taking part in a hurling match. The arrangement of the stones led to the name and was recorded as far back as 1584 by John Norden.
