= Edward Hamley =

Edward Hamley may refer to:

- Edward Hamley (poet) (1764–1834), British clergyman and poet
- Sir Edward Bruce Hamley (1824–1893), British general, military writer and politician
