= Birds of Cornwall =

Red-billed chough (left) can be distinguished from alpine chough in flight by its deeper primary "fingers" and tail wedge

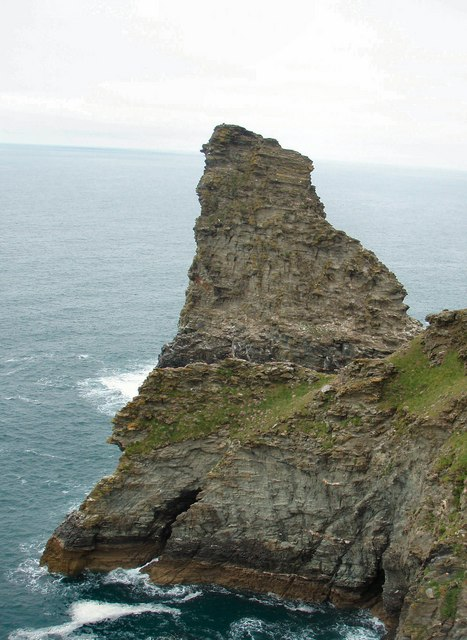
Sea bird colonies at Long Island near Boscastle

The birds of Cornwall are in general a selection of those found in the whole of the British Isles, though Cornwall's position at the extreme south-west of Great Britain results in many occasional migrants. The nightingale is one English bird which is virtually absent from Cornwall.

The tidal estuaries along the coasts contain large numbers of wading birds, while marshland bird species frequently settle in the bogs and mires inland. Bodmin Moor is a breeding ground for species such as lapwing, snipe and curlew. On and around the rivers, sand martins and kingfishers are often seen.

The sea cliffs host many marine bird species with the red-billed chough recently returning to the county after a long absence. This bird appears on the Cornish coat of arms and is the county animal of Cornwall.

- Pyrrhocorax pyrrhocorax pyrrhocorax, the nominate subspecies and smallest form, is endemic to the British Isles, but restricted to Ireland, the Isle of Man, and the far west of Wales and Scotland, although it has recently recolonised Cornwall after an absence of many years.

== North Cornwall ==
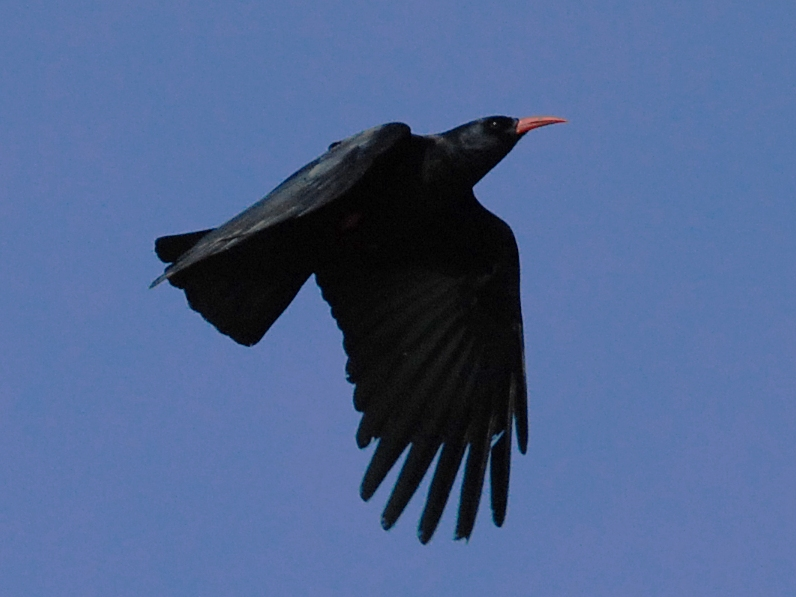
Cornish chough (P. p. pyrrhocorax) flying in west Cornwall

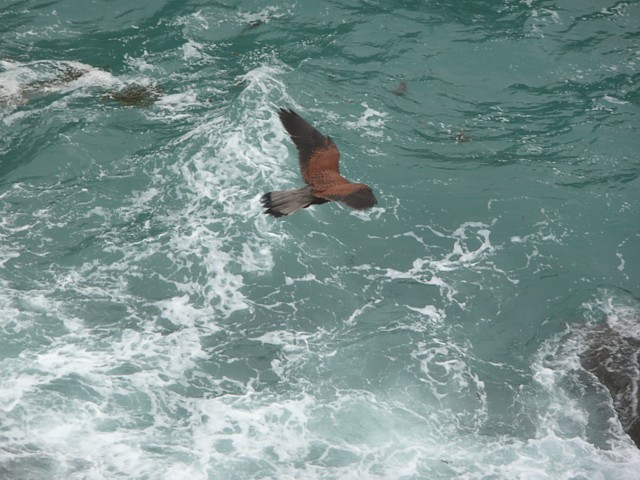
A kestrel in flight near the cliffs at Tintagel

The birds of the coast at Tintagel are well worth observing: in 1935 an anonymous writer mentions Willapark as the scene of spectacular flocks of seabirds (eight species); inland he describes the crows (including the Cornish chough and the raven) and falcons which frequent the district. (by the 1950s there were no longer choughs to be seen). This bird is emblematic of Cornwall and is also said to embody the spirit of King Arthur. B. H. Ryves mentions the razorbill as numerous at Tintagel (perhaps the largest colony in the county) and summarises reports from earlier in the century. In 1991 a local bird keeper, Jon Hadwick, published Owl Light about his experiences keeping ten owls and a buzzard. In the early days of the Royal Society for the Protection of Birds Charles Hambly (also known for saving shipwrecked sailors) was a correspondent for the Society. A hundred years later Harry Sandercock observed that even modern agricultural changes had not reduced the bird populations. Lye Rock near Bossiney is a breeding site for guillemots, razorbills, fulmars and shags. By 1940, the rock was Cornwall's third largest breeding colony for puffins though none now remain. Grey seals breed in the sea caves at the foot of the cliffs. These were once culled for their skins and oil. Fishermen would enter the caves with torches at low tide and club the dazzled animals to death.

The coastline near Polzeath is a particularly good area for seeing many types of coastal birds including puffins and peregrine falcons.

=== Camel Valley ===
With the large areas of salt marsh on the estuary, the River Camel provides an excellent location for birds. Large flocks of waders can be seen in winter, preyed on by local peregrines, and a migrant osprey often pauses a few days to fish in spring and autumn. Mute swans nest at several locations, particularly near to the bridge in Wadebridge where there is often a nest on a small island a few yards downstream of the bridge. Ducks are also found on the river with shelduck, shoveler and mallard on the estuary and Eurasian teal further upstream.

The Camel estuary was one of the first places in England to be colonised by little egrets, the birds being particularly seen on mudflats at low tide. Other rarities include an American belted kingfisher seen in the 1980s for only the second time in England.

Upstream on the River Camel, and on several of its tributaries, kingfishers can be seen, while the Cornwall Wildlife Trust reserve at Hawkes Wood is noted for nuthatches and tawny owls.

There are two birdwatching hides on the River Camel. Tregunna Hide (Grid reference SW 969 738) is owned by Cornwall County Council and is located on the Camel Trail and is open to the public. Burniere Hide (Grid Reference SW 982 740) is owned by the Cornwall Birdwatching and Preservation Society (CBWPS) and is only open to members. In addition, the CBWPS own the Walmsley Sanctuary which covers over 20 hectares (49 acres) on the River Amble, a tributary of the River Camel, with a further 2 hides for use by its members. The sanctuary is nationally important for wintering waders and wildfowl.

== West Cornwall ==
Gwennap Head is renowned for its relative abundance of passing marine bird species such as Manx and sooty shearwaters, skuas, petrels and whimbrels. In addition, a colony of breeding gannets are close by. Therefore, the headland is favoured by birdwatchers and many travel the length and breadth of Britain to track rare seabirds. Annually, the Seawatch SW survey aims to record the numbers of such species from a designated location close to the cliff edge on Gwennap Head.

The district of west Penwith being almost isolated from the rest of Cornwall has fewer resident species than the latter and those resident are generally in smaller numbers. However the only colonies of kittiwakes in the county are to be found in west Penwith and the only breeding records of blue-headed and yellow wagtails are also from there.

== Isles of Scilly ==
Because of the Gulf Stream, Scilly has a particularly mild climate - residents can grow sub-tropical plants there. Scilly is the first landing for many migrant birds, including extreme rarities from North America and Siberia. Scilly is situated far into the Atlantic Ocean, so many North American vagrant birds will make first European landfall in the archipelago.

Scilly is responsible for many firsts for Britain, and is particularly good at producing vagrant American passerines. If an extremely rare bird turns up, the island sees a significant increase in numbers of visiting birders.

=== Ornithologists ===
William Wagstaff, commonly known as Will Wagstaff, is a leading ornithologist and naturalist in the Isles of Scilly, and also an author. His popular guided wildlife walks have made him both a well-known and popular figure in the islands. Originally from South Wales, Wagstaff has lived on the Isles of Scilly since 1981. As of 2012 he serves as Honorary President and Chairman of the Isles of Scilly Bird Group.

Periglis Cottage on St Agnes, Isles of Scilly was the home of St Agnes's resident ornithologist Hilda M. Quick. She wrote Birds of the Scilly Isles, published in 1964.

The ornithologist David Bassil Hunt will be remembered as "... the man who brought Scilly wildlife into the lives of thousands of people over a period of 20 years". He was based on the Isles of Scilly for many years, working as an international birding tour-guide. His autobiography, Confessions of a Scilly Birdman, was published in the year of his death.

== Bird sanctuaries ==
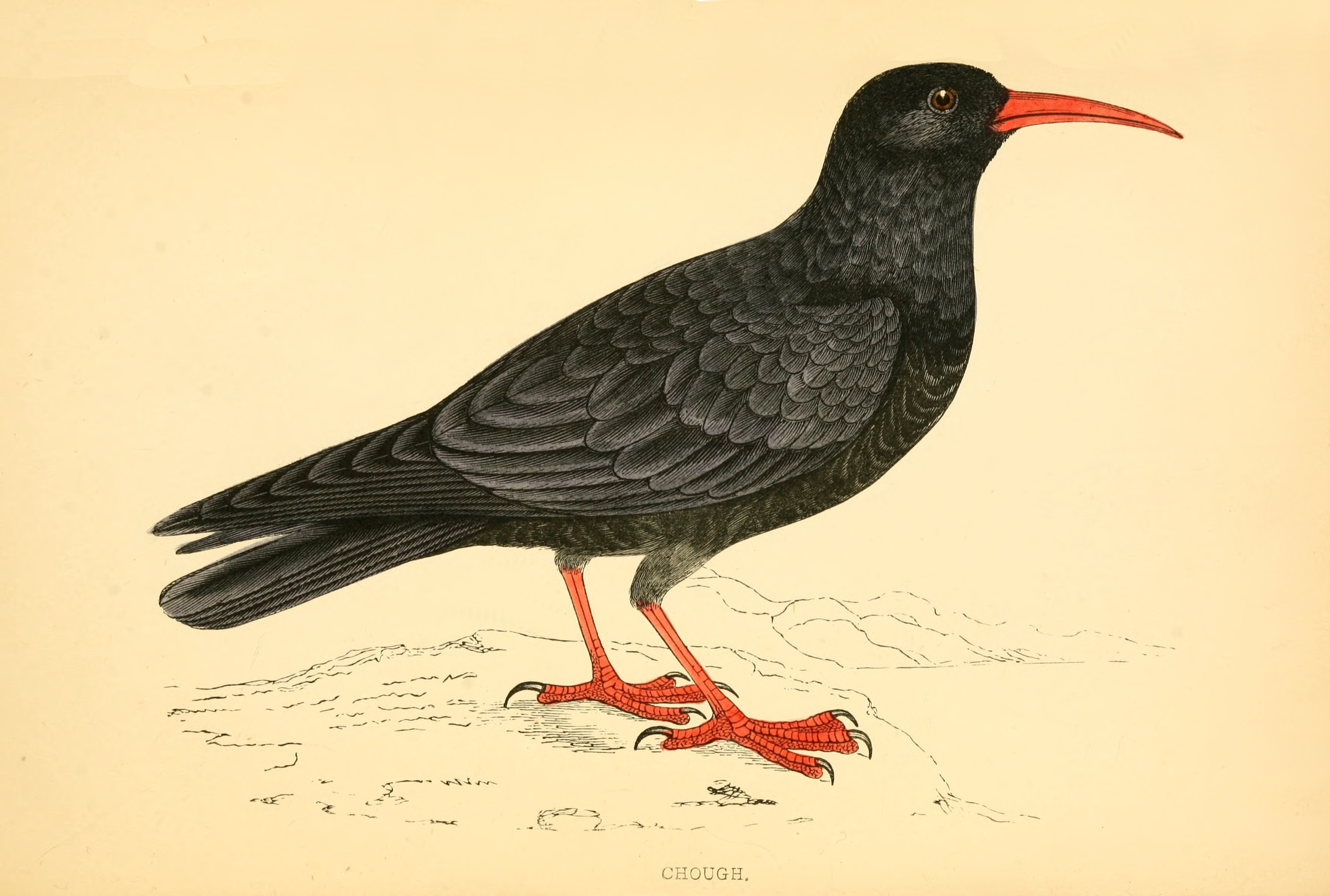
Pyrrhocorax pyrrhocorax: drawing by F. O. Morris, 1862

- The Cornish Birds of Prey Centre is a bird sanctuary near St Columb Major.
- Mousehole Wild Bird Hospital and Sanctuary is a wildlife hospital based near Mousehole. The hospital was founded in 1928 by Dorothy and Phyllis Yglesias and became famous following the Torrey Canyon disaster.
- The Screech Owl Sanctuary is a haven for sick and injured owls near St Columb Major. The sanctuary hosts hundreds of owls organized by species, and its work was recognised by an award from the BBC in 2002.
- The Cornwall Birdwatching and Preservation Society owns the Walmsley Sanctuary which covers over 20 hectares (49 acres) on the River Amble, a tributary of the River Camel, with 2 hides for use by its members. The sanctuary is nationally important for wintering waders and wildfowl. The sanctuary was purchased with a legacy from Dr. Robert Garrett Walmsley (d. 1939). The legacy was on condition that the society undertook "to provide and administer a Sanctuary for Migrating Waders within the Duchy of Cornwall". The land was purchased in 1939; it is 42 acres of land known as Lower Amble Marshes and is situated in the parish of St Kew.

== See also ==
- Cornish chicken
