= St Columb Major Town Hall =

Municipal building in St Columb Major, Cornwall, England

- Location within Cornwall
- 50.4352°N 4.9401°W
- Location: St Columb Major, Cornwall, England

Listed Building – Grade II*
- Official name: Town Hall
- Designated: 10 February 1967
- Reference no.: 1144107

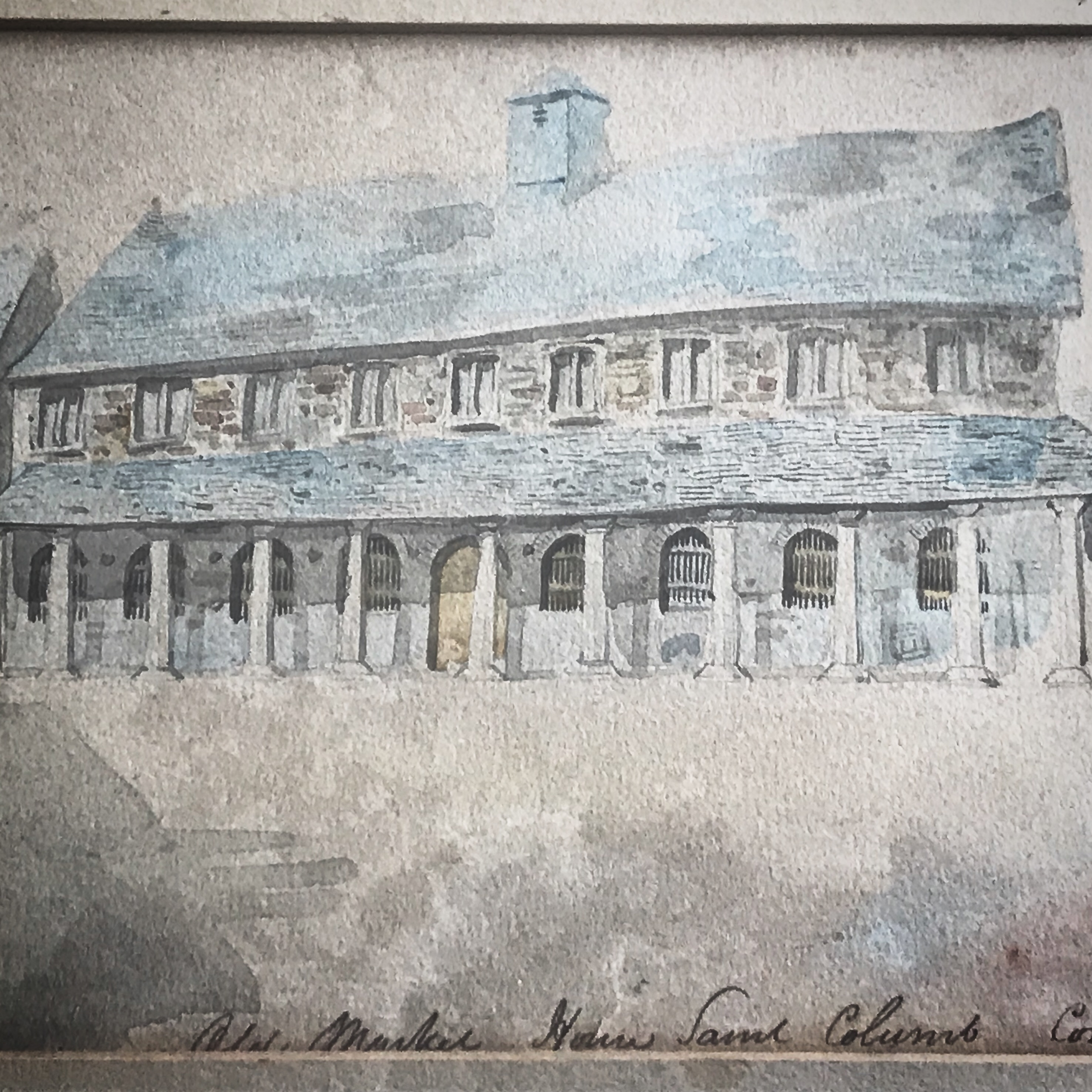
A watercolour painting by William Henry Brooke depicting the original market house before it was demolished

St Columb Major Town Hall is a historic building in the Market Place in St Columb Major, a town in Cornwall, in England. The building, which serves as the offices and meeting place of St Columb Major Town Council as well as a public library, is a Grade II* listed building.

== History ==
The current building was commissioned to replace an ancient market house, which consisted of a large room raised on arches. The current building was designed in the neoclassical style, built in rubble masonry with an ashlar stone front and sides, and was completed in 1848. It originally accommodated monthly meetings of the magistrates' court, the county court, and other public meetings on the first floor, while the ground floor housed the regular meat markets.

In 1913, a cinema known as "The Picture Palace" started showing silent films in the town hall; it became the "Town Hall Cinema" in the late 1920s and "Neath's Non-Flam Pictures" in the 1930s, before closing as a cinema in February 1945.

Since local government re-organisation in 1974, it has accommodated the offices of St Columb Major Town Council and been the venue for their meetings. The building also accommodates the local public library, which, since 2018, has been managed by the town council.

The annual Cornish hurling competition, which has been held on Shrove Tuesday each year for some 500 years, starts with the silver ball being thrown up in the Market Place close to the town hall, and the two teams then compete to take possession of the ball and place it in their own goal.

== Architecture ==
The design involves a symmetrical main frontage of five bays facing onto the Market Place. It is rusticated on the ground floor and features five round headed openings with voussoirs and keystones. These openings originally allowed unfettered access to the market hall; however, two of the openings have been infilled with doorways with fanlights and three have been infilled with windows with glazing bars. Above the ground floor openings there are a series of rectangular panels. The first floor is fenestrated by five round headed windows, also with voussoirs and keystones. At the east end, there is a blocked doorway flanked by a full height arch which is surmounted by a frieze, a date stone inscribed with the date MDCCCXLVIII (1848), a single-stage clock tower and a cupola. At the west end, there is a round headed doorway flanked by a pair of round headed windows. At roof level, there is a prominent cornice and a slate roof hidden behind a parapet. The building was grade II* listed in 1967.

== See also ==
- Grade II* listed buildings in Cornwall (Q–Z)
