= St Columb Major, St Mawgan and St Wenn (electoral division) =

Electoral division of Cornwall in the UK

- ward Cornwall Council
- Boundary of St Columb Major, St Mawgan and St Wenn in Cornwall from 2021.
- County: Cornwall

Current ward
- Created: 2021
- Councillor: Rowland O'Connor (Cornish Independent Nonaligned Group)
- Number of councillors: One

St Columb Major, St Mawgan and St Wenn is an electoral division of Cornwall in the United Kingdom which returns one member to sit on Cornwall Council. It was created at the 2021 local elections, being formed from the former division of St Columb Major. Since 2025, it has been represented by Rowland O'Connor, who originally stood as member of Reform UK but later joined the Cornish Independent Nonaligned Group.

== Councillors ==
Election	Member	Party
2021	Paul Wills	Independent
May 2025	Rowland O'Connor	Reform UK
October 2025	Rowland O'Connor	Independent

== Election results ==
=== 2021 election ===
2021 election: St Columb Major, St Mawgan and St Wenn
Party	Candidate	Votes	%	±%
Independent	Paul Wills	682	44.3	N/A
Conservative	Michelle Johns	532	34.5	N/A
Liberal Democrats	Pauline Avery	161	10.4	N/A
Labour	Scot Taylor	159	10.3	N/A
Majority		150	9.7	N/A
Rejected ballots		7	0.5	
Turnout		1,541		
Independent win (new seat)				

=== 2025 election ===
2025 election: St Columb Major, St Mawgan and St Wenn
Party	Candidate	Votes	%	±%
Reform	Rowland O'Connor	546	32.9	New
Liberal Democrats	Mathew Scott Appleton	489	29.5	+19.1
Independent	Paul Wills*	412	24.8	−19.5
Green	Sarah Elizabeth Thomson	213	12.8	New
Majority		57	3.4	−6.3
Rejected ballots		3	0.2	-0.3
Turnout		1660		
Reform gain from Independent				
