= St Columb Major Cemetery =

Sepulchral chapel in St. Columb Major, Cornwall, England, UK

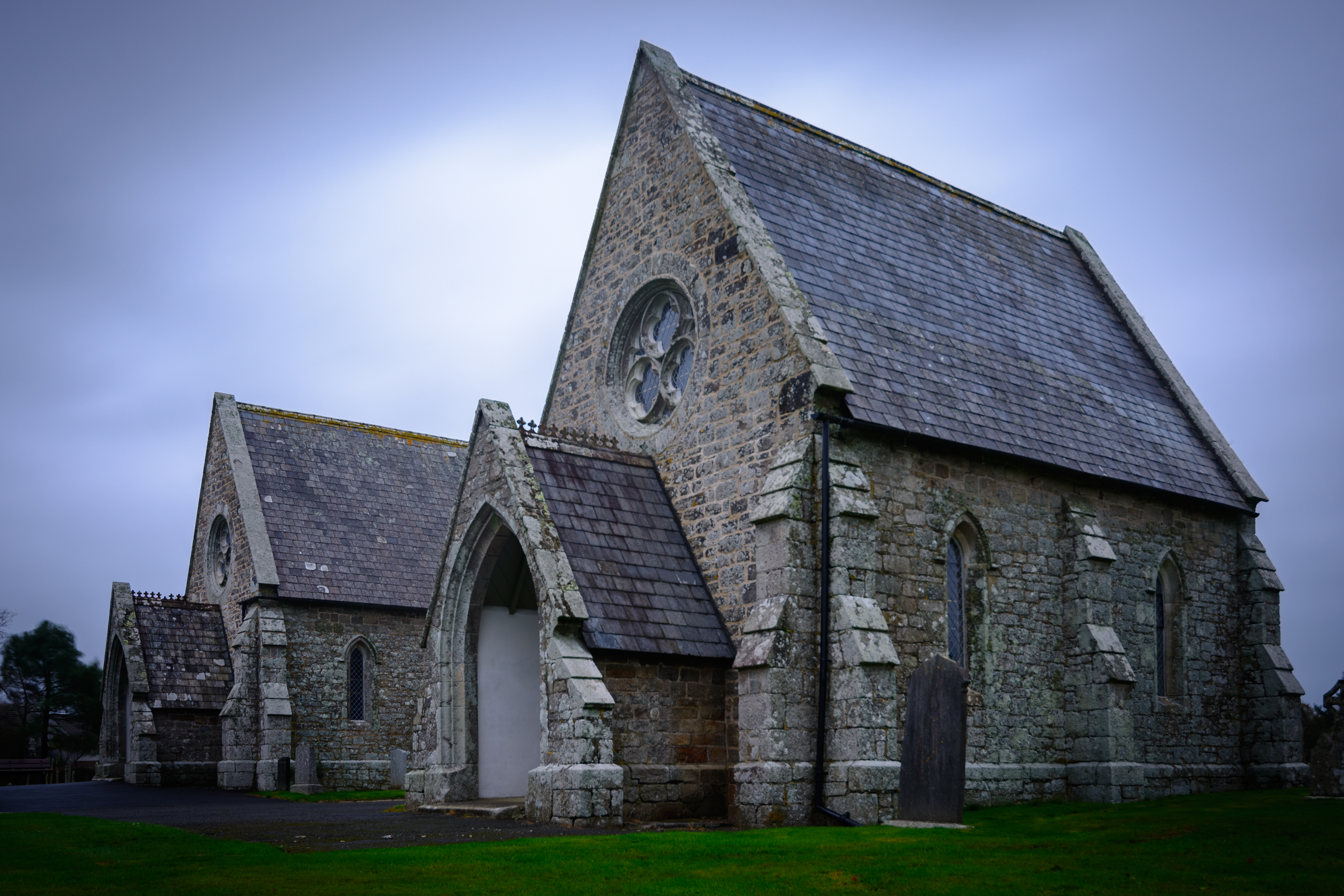
- Interactive map of St Columb Major Cemetery

Details
- Location: St Columb Major, Cornwall, England
- Country: United Kingdom
- Coordinates: 50.42725°N 4.94578°W
- Owned by: St Columb Major Town Council
- Find a Grave: 2564472

St Columb Major Cemetery is a burial ground located in St Columb Major, Cornwall, UK. It serves the local parish and surrounding area and remains in active use for burials.

== History ==
St Columb Cemetery was established in the 19th century to provide additional burial space for St Columb Major as the parish churchyard became full. It has since been extended in phases to meet ongoing local needs.

During the Second World War, the cemetery was used in connection with RAF St Eval, located approximately seven kilometres away. This association is reflected in the presence of grouped military burials within the cemetery.

== Features ==
The cemetery contains a pair of mortuary chapels, constructed circa 1856, which are designated as Grade II listed buildings. One chapel was historically used for Church of England burials and the other for Nonconformist denominations, including Methodists. The chapels are built in granite in a Gothic Revival style and form a significant architectural feature of the site.

== War graves ==
The cemetery contains 41 Commonwealth war graves, maintained by the Commonwealth War Graves Commission. Of these, 38 are Second World War burials, including one unidentified airman, many of whom are buried in a grouped section associated with RAF St Eval.

There are also two First World War burials, which are comparatively uncommon for the site.

In addition, the cemetery contains the grave of a German airman.

== Current use ==
St Columb Cemetery remains open for new burials and is maintained by St Columb Major Town Council.
