= Quoit, Cornwall =

Coordinates: 50.4208°N 4.9244°W

Quoit
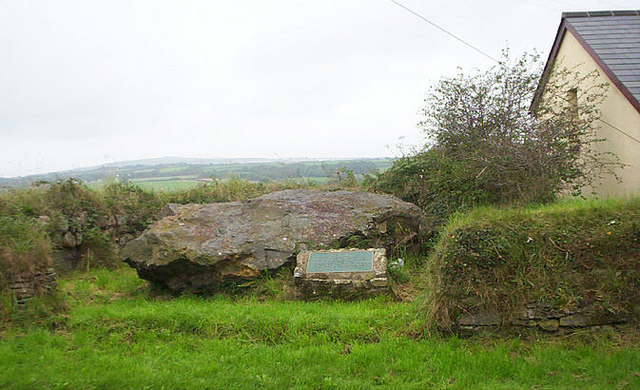
- Remains of Devil's Quoit

- Location within Cornwall
- Civil parish: St Columb
- Unitary authority: Cornwall
- Ceremonial county: Cornwall
- Region: South West
- Country: England
- Sovereign state: United Kingdom
- Post town: ST. COLUMB
- Postcode district: TR9
- Dialling code: 01637
- Police: Devon and Cornwall
- Fire: Cornwall
- Ambulance: South Western
- UK Parliament: St Austell and Newquay

Quoit is a settlement in mid Cornwall, United Kingdom. It is situated in the parish of St. Columb Major approximately one mile (2 km) southeast of the town of St Columb Major and 7 miles (12 km) east of Newquay. It lies between the A30 dual carriageway trunk road and the A39 road through St Columb Major.

== Devil's Quoit ==
The hamlet derives its name from a dolmen known as "Devil's Quoit" (or "Arthur's Quoit") at grid reference SW92326193. Although one support stone was removed in the 18th century, the dolmen was still standing in 1840. It partially collapsed between 1840 and 1850. By the 20th century, the stones had been split and either deliberately buried or incorporated in surrounding hedges.
