= Springfields Fun Park =

Theme park in Cornwall, England

Coordinates: 50.413°N 4.928°W

- Springfields Fun Park and Pony Centre
- Interactive map of Springfields Fun Park
- Type: Theme park
- Location: Cornwall, England, United Kingdom
- Website: https://www.springfieldfunpark.co.uk/

Springfields Fun Park is a small theme park in Cornwall, England, United Kingdom. It is situated just over one mile south of St Columb Major and advertises itself as Springfields Fun Park and Pony Centre.
