= Dick Twinney =

English illustrator and wildlife artist

Dick Twinney is an English illustrator and wildlife artist. Originally from Devon, he lives and works in Cornwall.

His work appears in the Cornish Guardian where he writes and illustrates the weekly article 'Wildlife Gallery'. He lives in St Columb Major where he has a gallery.

== Books as illustrator ==
- The Painted Seasons: Year in the Life of the Countryside ISBN 0-86350-192-3
- Night Animals; by Mark Carwardine. ISBN 0-944483-30-5
- The Brave Little Owl. Embossed Books ISBN 1-84164-048-4
