= Gluvian =

Hamlet in mid Cornwall, England

Coordinates: 50°26′36″N 4°56′12″W

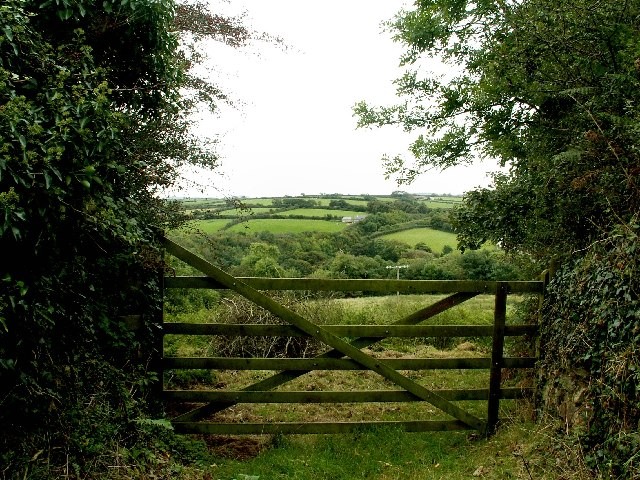
Farmland at Gluvian, Cornwall

Gluvian is a hamlet in mid Cornwall, England, United Kingdom. It is situated one mile (1.6 km) north of St Columb Major (where the 2011 census population was included) at grid reference SW 915 645.

Mayor William Mayow of Gluvian in the parish of St Columb was hanged outside a tavern in St Columb in 1549.
