= St Columb Major =

Town in Cornwall, England

St Columb Major: Cornish: Sen Kolom Veur
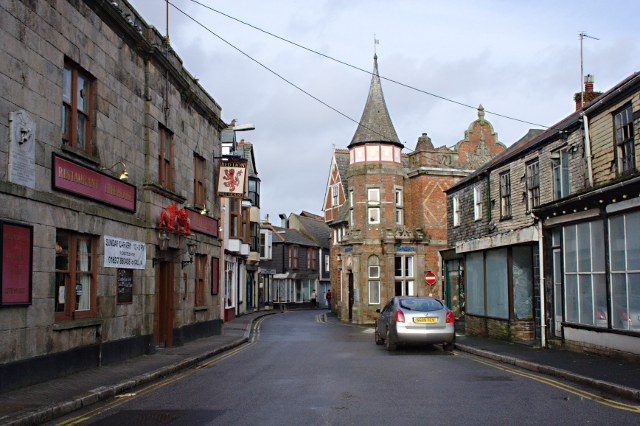
- Fore Street

- Location within Cornwall
- Population: 4,688 (Parish, 2021); 3,679 (Built up area, 2021)
- OS grid reference: SW912633
- Civil parish: St Columb Major
- Unitary authority: Cornwall
- Ceremonial county: Cornwall
- Region: South West
- Country: England
- Sovereign state: United Kingdom
- Post town: ST. COLUMB
- Postcode district: TR9
- Dialling code: 01637
- Police: Devon and Cornwall
- Fire: Cornwall
- Ambulance: South Western
- UK Parliament: North Cornwall

St Columb Major (Cornish: Sen Kolom Veur [sɛn kɔlɔm vœr]) is a town and civil parish in Cornwall, England, United Kingdom. Often referred to locally as St Columb, it is approximately seven miles (11 km) southwest of Wadebridge and six miles (10 km) east of Newquay. The town is named after Columba of Cornwall, also known as Columb, a 6th-century saint. The designation Major distinguishes the town from St Columb Minor, a village to the west, which now forms part of Newquay. As well as the town of St Columb Major itself, the parish also includes surrounding rural areas. At the 2021 census the parish had a population of 4,688 and the built up area had a population of 3,679.

Twice a year the town plays host to "hurling", a medieval game once common throughout Cornwall but now only played in St Columb and St Ives. (Note: It is also played irregularly and less frequently at Bodmin, but nowhere else.) It is played on Shrove Tuesday and again on the Saturday eleven days later. The game involves two teams of unlimited numbers (the 'townsmen' and the 'countrymen' of St Columb parish) who endeavour to carry a silver ball to goals set two miles (3 km) apart or across the parish boundary, making the parish, around 17.2 square miles (45 km^{2}) in area, the de facto largest sports ground in the world.

== History and antiquities ==
=== Bronze and Iron Ages ===
Archaeological monuments from the Bronze and Iron Ages within the area include Castle an Dinas, a substantial Iron Age hillfort;"A Gazetteer of Arthurian Topographic Folklore". Arthuriana. the Nine Maidens stone row, considered the longest extant alignment of standing stones in Cornwall;"Nine Maidens (Stone Row)". The Modern Antiquarian. and the Devil's Quoit—also referred to as King Arthur's Quoit—located in the hamlet of Quoit."Devil's Quoit (Dolmen)". The Modern Antiquarian.

=== Middle Ages and early modern period ===
There are four Cornish crosses in the parish: two are in the churchyard, one is at the hamlet of Black Cross and another (defaced) at Black Rock. (one of the crosses is illustrated below, under Church.)

In 1333 Edward III granted a market in St Columb Major to Sir John Arundell. This was as a reward for supplying troops to fight the Scottish at the Battle of Halidon Hill near Berwick-on-Tweed.

Following the Prayer Book Rebellion of 1549, William Mayow the Mayor of St Columb was hanged by Provost Marshal, Anthony Kingston outside a tavern in St Columb as a punishment leading an uprising in Cornwall. The link between the Cornish language and Catholicism was also exhibited in the activities of John Kennall, at St Columb, where he was still holding Mass as late as 1590.

In 1645 during the English Civil War, Sir Thomas Fairfax's troops were advancing from Bodmin towards Truro; on 7 March the army held a rendezvous, and halted one night, four miles (6 km) beyond Bodmin. The King's forces were quartered at this time near St Columb, where a smart skirmish took place between the Prince's regiment and a detachment of the Parliamentary army under Colonel Rich, in which the latter was victorious.

The population was 1,337 by 1841.

=== Twentieth century ===
Royal visits were made to St Columb in 1909, 1977 and 1983. On 9 June 1909 the town was visited by the Prince of Wales (George V) and his wife, the Princess of Wales (Mary of Teck). The visit was to open the Royal Cornwall Agricultural Show. The Prince gave 2 silver cups: one for the best bull and another for the best horse. In August 1977 The Queen and Prince Philip visited the town during their Silver Jubilee tour of Cornwall. On 27 May 1983: The town was visited by the Prince and Princess of Wales (Charles and Diana). The visit was to commemorate the 650th anniversary of the signing of the town charter by Edward III. A plaque commemorates this visit outside the former Conservative club in Union Square.

In 1992 Australian stuntman Matt Coulter aka The Kangaroo Kid set the record for the longest jump with a crash on a quad bike at Retallack Adventure Park, St Columb Major.

== Geography ==
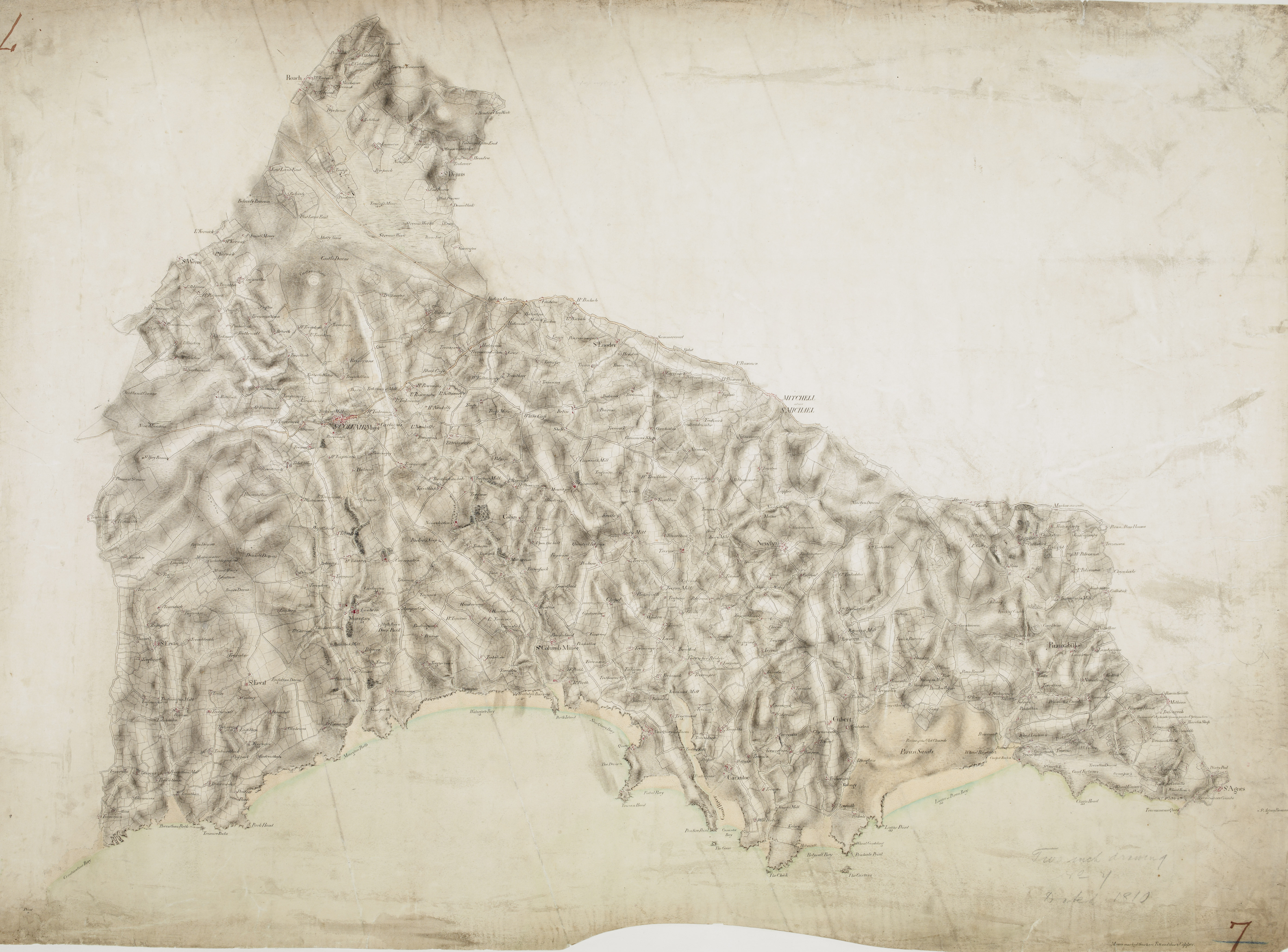
Map of St Columb Major and surrounding area, by Robert K. Dawson, 1810

St Columb Major is a parish located in mid-Cornwall, approximately 8 miles (13 km) inland from the north coast near Padstow Harbour.

The parish covers an area of 12,884 acres (5,214 ha; 20 sq mi; 52 km^{2}). Its highest point is Castle an Dinas, an Iron Age hill fort located approximately 2 miles (3 km) east of the town, rising to 709 feet (216 m) above sea level.

The landscape is primarily agricultural, consisting of a mix of arable and pastoral farmland interspersed with small areas of woodland. Moorland is present in the generally higher ground to the north and east, including parts of the Goss Moor in the southeast, Castle Downs to the east, and moorland adjoining Rosenannon Downs in the northeast.

To the west of the town lies the Vale of Lanherne, a scenic valley through which the River Menalhyl flows. This area, known for its natural beauty, links St Columb Major with St Mawgan churchtown.

=== Town ===
St Columb occupies a plateau at about 300 feet (91 m) elevation. The north part of the town (known as 'Bridge') descends into the Vale of Lanherne, having a minimum elevation of approximately 165 feet (50 m). It was originally a linear settlement built on the main road running north-east to south-west, but modern estates have since been built, extending the town to the south and east. In the older part of the settlement there is much high-density housing with relatively narrow streets, and a number of retail outlets and public houses; the more modern estates have housing which is generally lower in density. To the south there is an industrial estate.

=== Settlements ===
Besides the town, there are numerous villages and hamlets in the parish, including Talskiddy and Gluvian in the north, Ruthvoes (southeast), Trebudannon (south), Tregaswith (southwest), Tregatillian (east) and a large number of smaller farming settlements and isolated dwellings. There are also Halloon, Lanhizey, Rosedinnick, Tregamere, Trekenning, Tresaddern, Trevarron, Trevolgas and Trugo.

=== Rivers ===
A number of small rivers and streams flow through St Columb parish, most rising in the eastern part and flowing west. One of the sources of the River Fal lies just within the boundary on the Goss Moor; this flows southwest to the South Coast. The River Menalhyl, which flows through the north part of St Columb (Bridge), has three branches with a confluence at Gilbert's Water, just to the east of the town. The longest of these rises next to the Nine Maidens standing stones in the north part of the parish. The Menalhyl was historically important in the area, powering a number of mills along its course. A smaller river rises near Winnard's Perch (north of Talskiddy), later joining the Menalhyl near its mouth at Mawgan Porth. The other main river of the parish is the unnamed one (often called the River Porth) that rises to the east of Ruthvoes, and that in its latter course fills the Porth Reservoir and enters the sea at St Columb Porth. This is the river that, according to legend, was begun by the blood of the murdered Saint Columba running down the valley.

=== Protected areas ===
Borlasevath and Retallack Moor (SSSI), noted for its biological characteristics, series of thin lakes and streams is directly north of spa/lodges resort Retallack; which occupies some of the thinner end, the north of the parish.

=== Transport ===
The A39 main road runs north to south through the parish. Until the late 1970s it went through the town but a bypass now carries traffic east of St Columb. The A30 dual carriageway also runs through the southeastern part of the parish north of Goss Moor. A small part of the parish is occupied by a corner of Newquay Airport, which is Cornwall's principal civil airport.

The Par-Newquay railway line does not enter St Columb parish but forms part of its southern boundary. St Columb Road railway station opened in 1876 at the point where the railway crosses the main road towards St Columb. The station is some 2 miles (3 km) south of the centre of St Columb Major and is in the neighbouring parish of St Enoder. The separate settlement of St Columb Road subsequently grew up around the station.

== Architecture ==
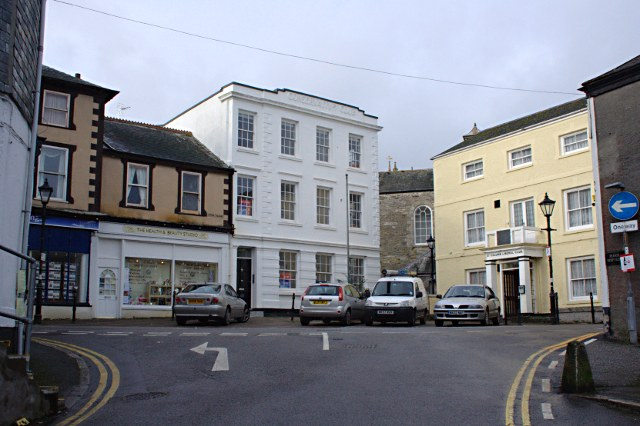
Union Square

The older part of the town follows a linear layout along Fair Street and Fore Street. Many houses on the narrow main street are slate hung. Cornish architect Silvanus Trevail designed the former Lloyds Bank and the school. Private houses by Trevail include Ashleigh House (1896) and Treventon House (1897). There are some good examples of architect William White's work including Bank House (circa 1857), Rosemellyn House (1871) Penmellyn House Old Rectory and alterations to Trewan Hall. The Retreat was formerly St Columb Workhouse and was designed by George Gilbert Scott. In recent years, the town has seen numerous new developments, including Jenner Parc and Arundell Parc. Other buildings of note include the former Barclays Bank, the Red Lion public house, Bond House, Hawkes shop and St Columb Major Town Hall. The oldest house in St Columb is the Glebe House.

== Church ==
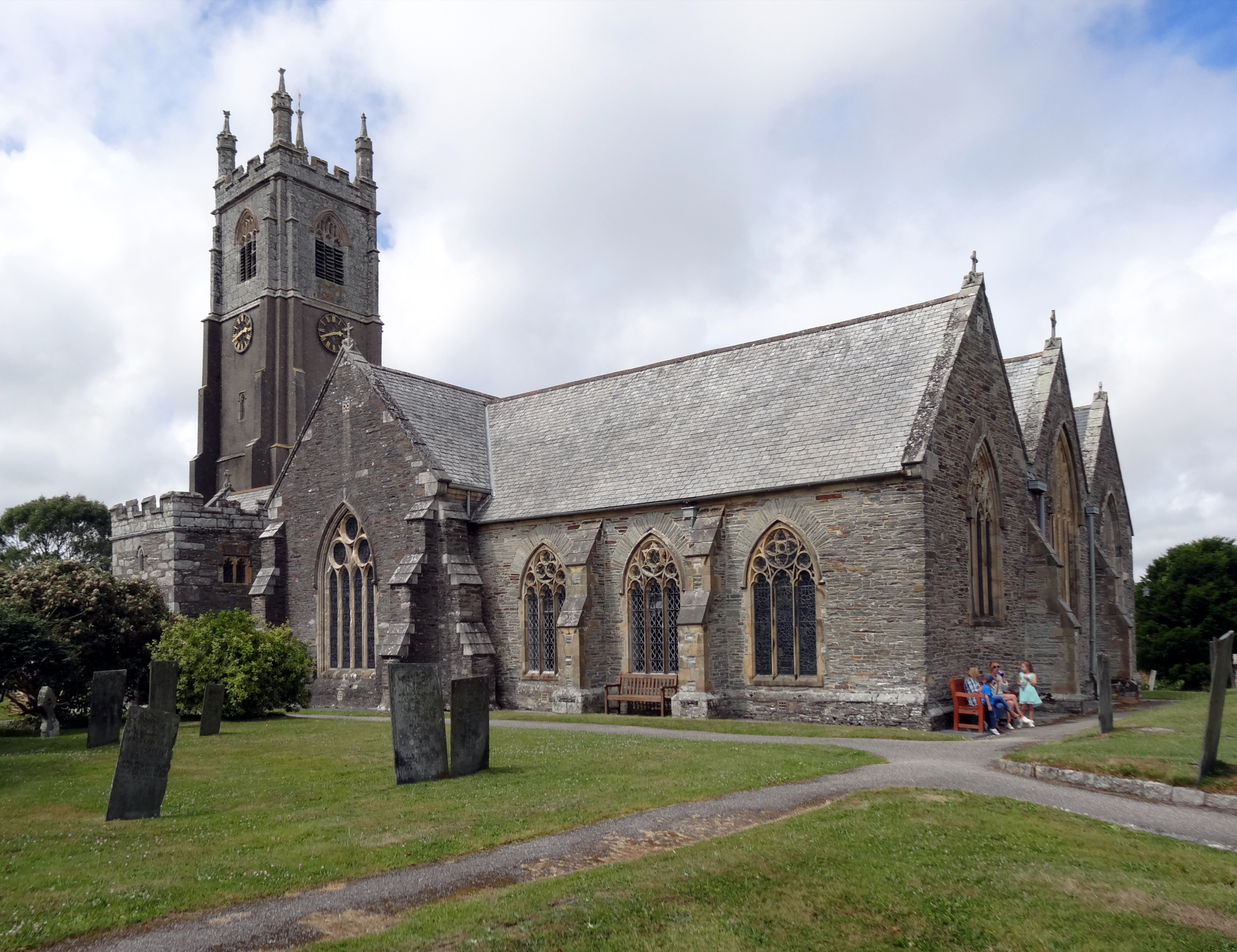
St Columba's Church

The church is dedicated to Columba, a local saint: her well is at Ruthvoes. For most of the Middle Ages the church belonged to the Arundells of Lanherne and was lavishly endowed. Within the church were two chantry chapels served by six priests altogether (five for the Arundell chantry). The tower is a fine example of a fifteenth-century building, consisting of four stages with battlements and pinnacles. It is 80 feet (24 m) high and contains eight bells re-hung in 1950. In 1920 the chiming clock was added as a memorial to the men of St Columb who died in the Great War. In 1860 plans were drawn up by William Butterfield, in hope of St Columb church becoming the cathedral of the future diocese of Cornwall, but the cathedral was built at Truro.

In the year 1676, the greatest part of the church was blown up with gunpowder by three youths of the town.

By the 19th century the parish churchyard at St Columb Major had reached capacity for new burials, and St Columb Major Cemetery was established to serve as an additional burial ground for the town.

The church is the venue for the "Classic Cornwall" music festival.

== St Columba's Holy Well ==
50.406°N 4.908°W The holy well dedicated to Saint Columba adjoins the hamlet of Ruthvoes, about two miles (3.2 km) from the town. According to legend, she was beheaded here. The hamlet is near to the A30 dual carriageway and the Par to Newquay railway line.

== Governance ==
There are two tiers of local government covering St Columb Major, at parish (town) and unitary authority level: St Columb Major Town Council and Cornwall Council. The town council is based St Columb Major Town Hall in the Market Place, which was completed in 1848.

St Columb Major was an ancient parish in the Pydarshire Hundred of Cornwall. In 1837 St Columb Major and several neighbouring parishes were grouped together as the St Columb Major poor law union to collectively deliver their functions under the poor laws. A workhouse was built to serve the union at the northern end of St Columb Major. When elected parish and district councils were established under the Local Government Act 1894, St Columb Major was given a parish council and included in the St Columb Major Rural District. In 1934 the rural district was abolished and the parish was transferred to the St Austell Rural District instead.

St Austell Rural District was abolished in 1974 under the Local Government Act 1972, when the area became part of the new borough of Restormel. As part of the 1974 reforms, parish councils were given the right to declare their parishes to be a town, allowing them to take the title of town council and giving the title of mayor to the council's chairperson. St Columb Major Parish Council exercised this right, becoming St Columb Major Town Council.

Restormel was abolished in 2009. Cornwall County Council then took on district-level functions, making it a unitary authority, and was renamed Cornwall Council.

== St Columb Town crest ==
The crest of St Columb with town motto

The town crest consists of a hand holding a silver hurling ball with the motto "Town and Country do your best". The design originally appeared on medals awarded to winners of the hurling game and were first awarded in the 1930s. Later the design was adopted by the town council as a symbol of civic pride. The emblem appears on the mayoral chains and it is used on the uniform of St Columb School. Roadsigns at each end of the town also bear the design.

== Cornish wrestling ==
Richard Parkyn

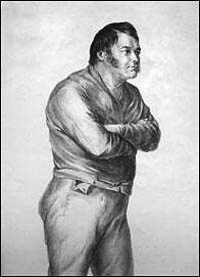
James Polkinghorne

St Columb has been a major centre for Cornish wrestling for centuries.

Places where tournaments for prizes have been held include the Red Lion Hotel, a field at Bospolvens, a field in New Road, the recreation ground and the St Columb School playing field.

Richard Parkyn (1772-1855), is perhaps the most famous champion Cornish wrestler. He was from St Columb Major and was known as "The Great Parkyn". He was dominant from 1795 through to 1811. He was so famous that the hamlet of Parkyn's Shop was named after him.

James Polkinghorne (1788–1851) was the landlord of the King's Arms pub and then the landlord of the Red Lion pub both in St Columb Major. He was one of the most renowned champion Corish wrestlers who had a number of famous contests against Devon fighters, including Flower, Jackman (1816) and Abraham Cann (1826), which drew very large crowds of spectators (c17,000). There is a large carved marble memorial of the Cann fight located on the front of the Red Lion pub.

See also Cornish wrestling at Talskiddy.

Currently there is a Cornish wrestling club, open to the public, which meets every Friday from 7pm to 9pm at the St Columba Centre.

== Literary associations ==
- St Columb features several times in the 1961 novel Castle Dor, by Daphne du Maurier (with Sir Arthur Quiller-Couch.) In particular it mentions the parish church, Castle An Dinas, The Red Lion Inn and Tresaddern Farm.
- The fictional character named Alfred John Trewhella (from St Columb) features in Kangaroo a novel by D. H. Lawrence, first published in 1923. It is set in Australia and is an account of a visit to New South Wales by an English writer named Richard Lovat Somers, and his German wife Harriet, in the early 1920s. This appears to be semi-autobiographical, based on a three-month visit to Australia by Lawrence and his wife Frieda, in 1922. The novel includes a chapter describing the couple's experiences in wartime Cornwall, vivid descriptions of the Australian landscape, and Richard Somers's sceptical reflections on fringe politics in Sydney.

== Notable residents ==
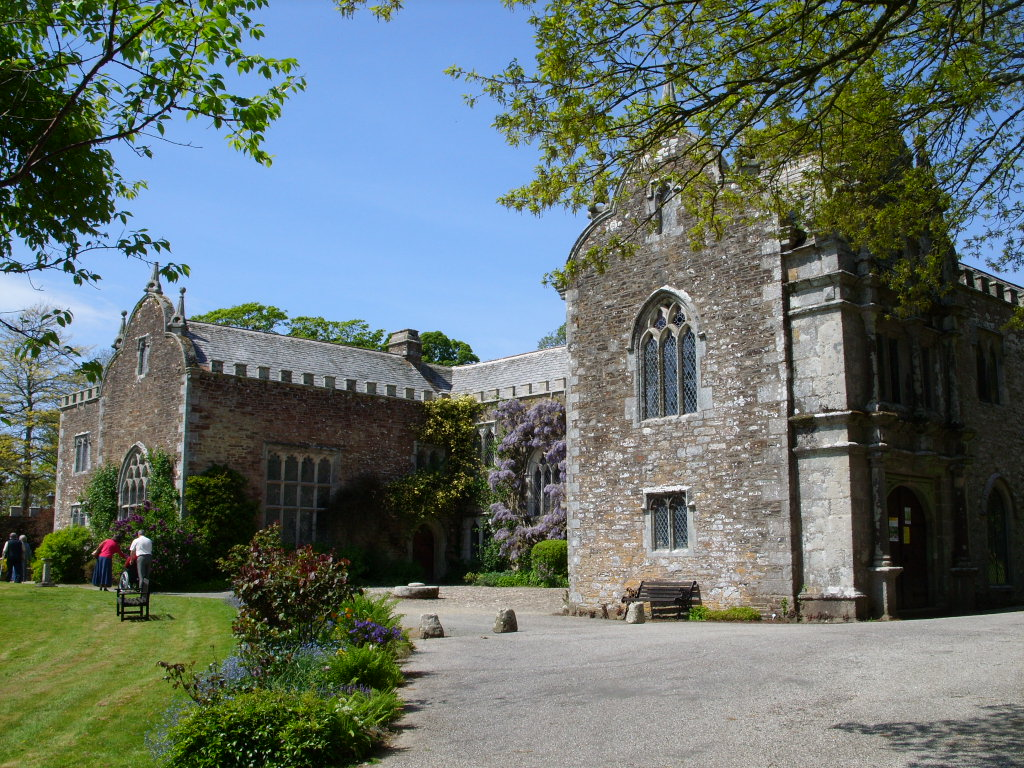
Trewan Hall, 2009

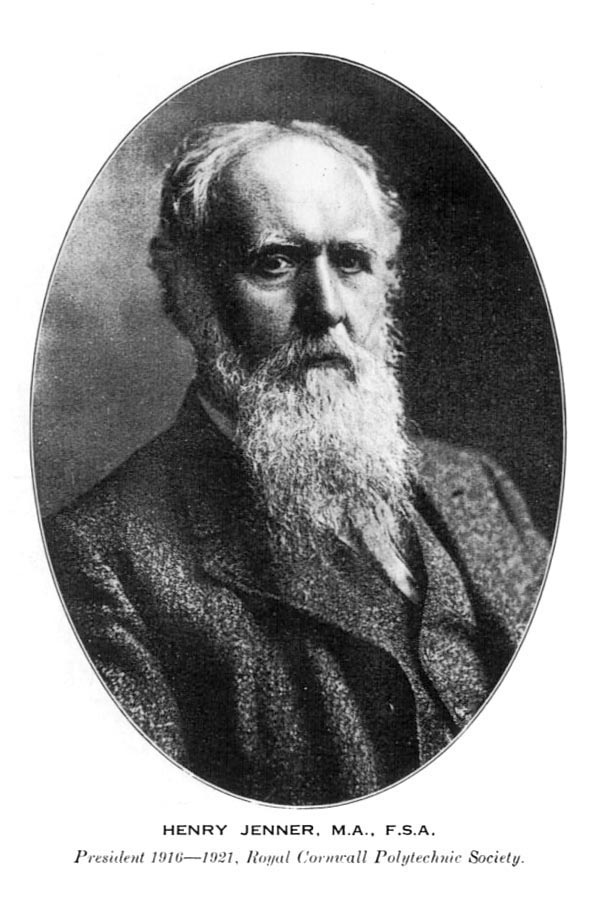
Henry Jenner

- John Kennall (1511–1592), Rector of St Columb, Cornish scholar
- Richard Bonython (1580–1650), magistrate and early settler and landowner in New England.
- Vivian family (from 1633), for over three centuries owners of Trewan Hall
- John King (1652–1732), churchman, Rector of Chelsea.
- James Paynter (1666 – ??), leader of the Jacobite uprising in Cornwall of 1715, declared the Old Pretender in St Columb town square.
- Ralph Allen (1693–1764), Post Master. As a teenager he worked at St Columb Post Office. He moved to Bath in 1710 where he became a clerk in the Bath Post Office, and at the age of 19, in 1712, he became the Post Master of Bath.
- Robert Hoblyn (1710–1756), politician, book collector and MP for city of Bristol in 1741 and 1747.
- Edward Hamley (1764-1834), clergyman and poet.
- William Hicks (1788–1874) Royal Navy Officer, wounded at the Battle of Trafalgar
- John Nichols Thom (1799–1838), the Cornish self-declared Messiah who lead one force in the Battle of Bossenden Wood.
- Henry Jenner (1848–1934), Celtic scholar, Cornish cultural activist, and the chief originator of the Cornish language revival.
- Matthew Smith (1879–1959), artist/painter, lived here in the autumn and winter of 1920
- Wilfred Theodore Blake (1894–1968), a pioneer aviator, author and traveller, he led the first attempt to fly round the world in 1922.
- Stephen Robert Nockolds (1909–1990), geochemist, petrologist and winner of the Murchison Medal.
- Cyril Bencraft Joly (1918–2000), inventor, author and Desert Rat Army veteran, lived locally

=== Sport ===
- Richard Parkyn (c. 1772-1855), a champion Cornish wrestler.
- Richard Bullock (1847–1921), gunman, his quick-shooting on the Deadwood stage gained him the nickname "Deadwood Dick" in the Wild West Cowboy era
- Percy Bennett (1869-1936), rugby union forward who played for Cardiff Harlequins and 4 games for Wales.
- Jack Crapp (1912–1981), England cricketer who played 452 First-class cricket games and 7 Test cricket matches for England.
- Ernest Smythe (1904–1975), cricketer and Indian Army officer, who lived and died in the town.

== Education ==
St Columb Major is served, at primary level, by St Columb Major ACE Academy - part of the Atlantic Centre of Excellence Multi Academy Trust.

== Amenities, large employers and tourist attractions ==
=== Main employers ===
- Cytiva formerly Pall Corporation – Filtration and separation technology. Currently employs 300 people at St Columb.
- Mole Valley Farmers – agricultural supplies and equipment. (Opened 1986)
- St Austell Breweries has a distribution centre here (opened 2009).
- Western Flat Roofing Co.

=== Nearby tourist attractions ===
- Cornish Birds of Prey Centre
- Camel Creek Adventure Park
- Screech owl sanctuary
- Springfields Fun Park
- Retallick Resort and Spa

== See also ==
- Cornish hurling, twice yearly hurling match within the town
- POW Camp 115, Whitecross, St. Columb Major
- Bulldog Class locomotive was named St. Columb
- List of topics related to Cornwall
- St. Columb Road
