= Tregaswith =

Coordinates: 50.42540°N 4.96635°W

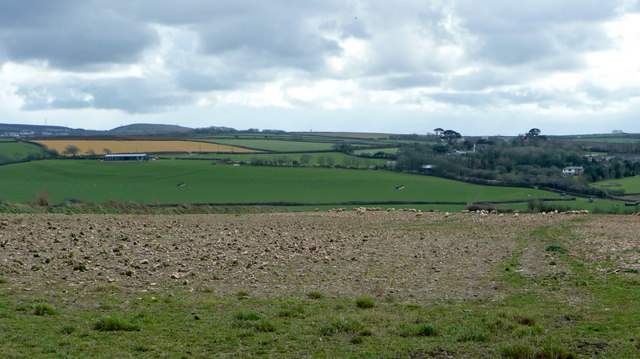
The view south of Tregaswith Farm

Tregaswith (grid reference SW894626) is a hamlet in the parish of St Columb Major, Cornwall. It is situated to the south-west of the town of St Columb, and just south of the A3059 main road between St Columb and Newquay. The hamlet is about 1 mile from RAF St Mawgan airfield.
