= Screech Owl Sanctuary =

Animal sanctuary in Cornwall, England

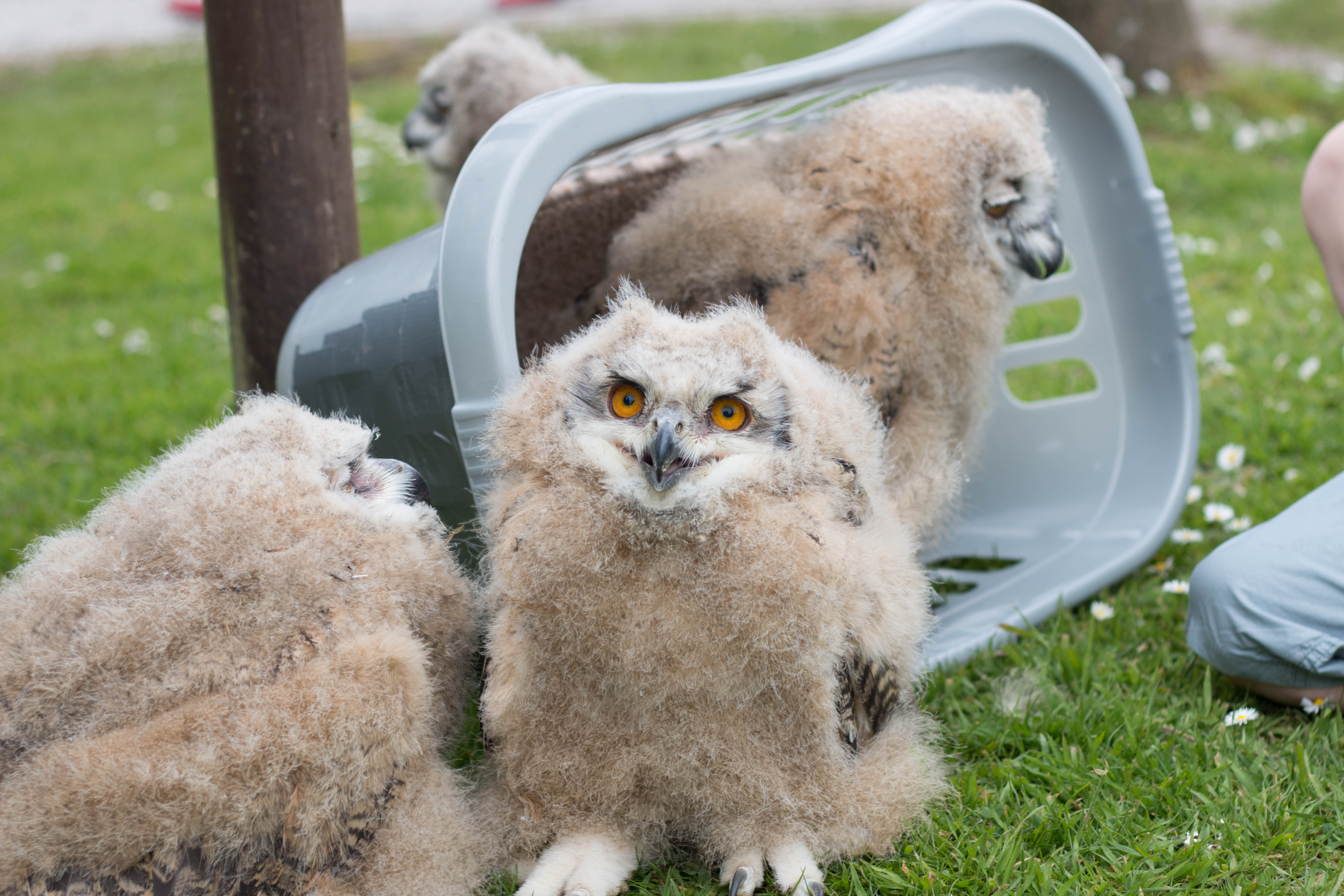
- Baby Siberian eagle-owls
- Interactive map of Screech Owl Sanctuary
- 50.407°N 4.898°W
- Date opened: 1990
- Location: St Columb Major, Cornwall, UK
- Website: Official website

The Screech Owl Sanctuary and Animal Park is a home for owls and other animals located near St Columb Major in Cornwall, England.

It was founded in 1990 by Carolyn Screech and shows owls from around the world.

== Gallery ==
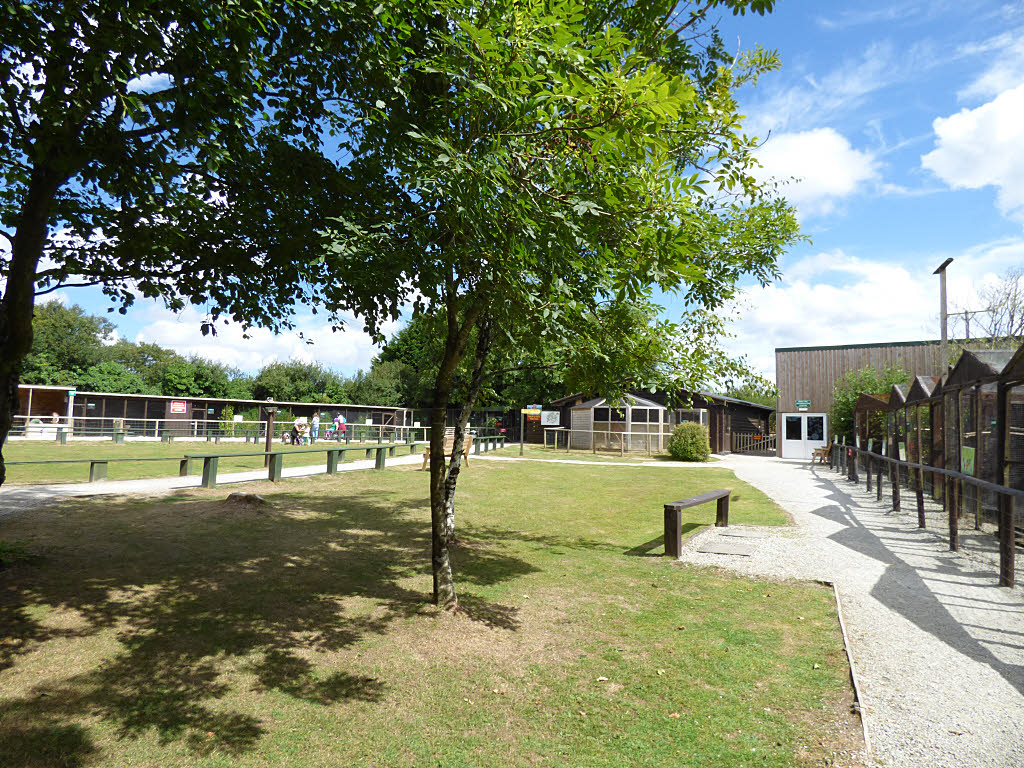
General view

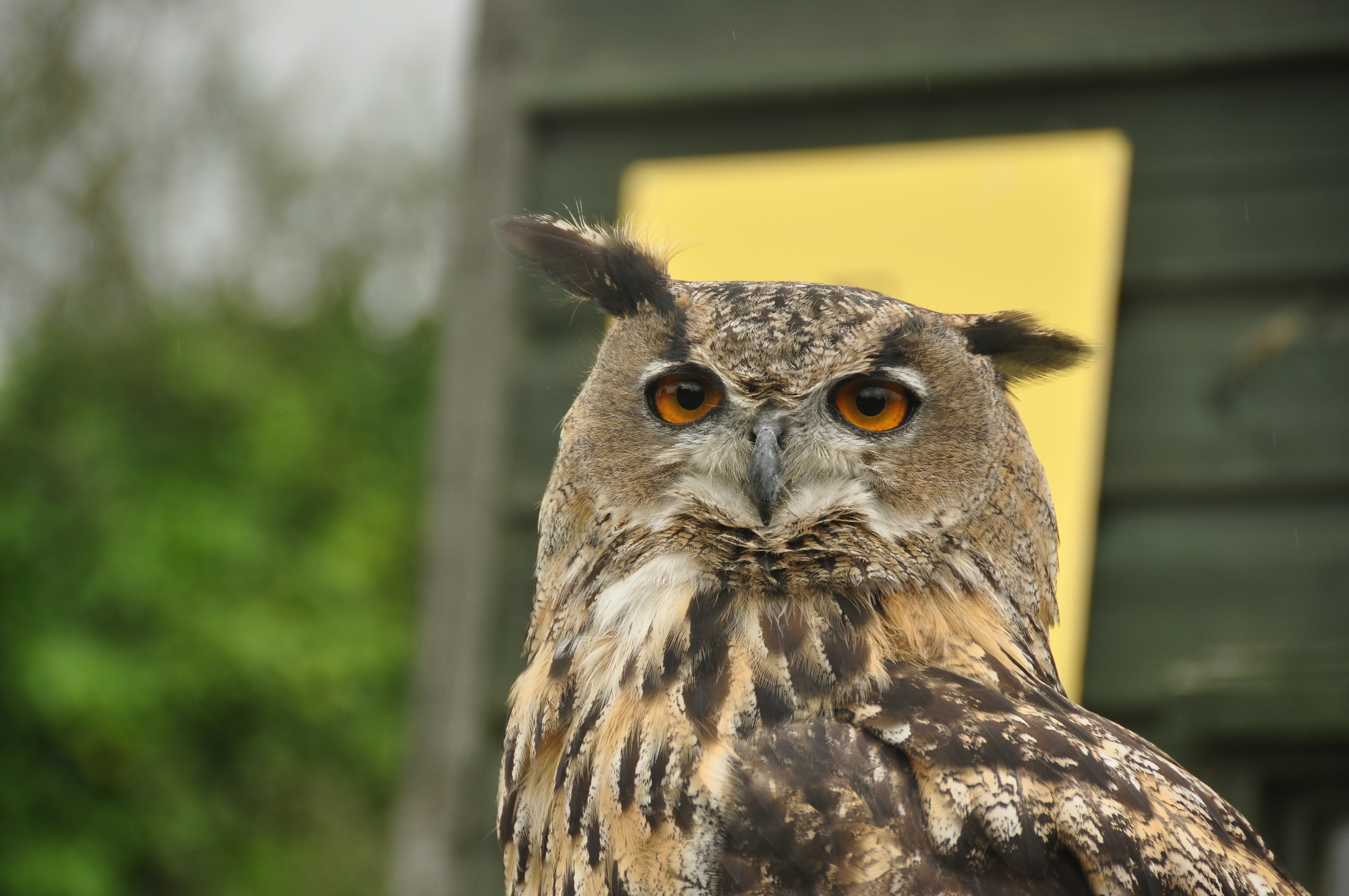
Owl

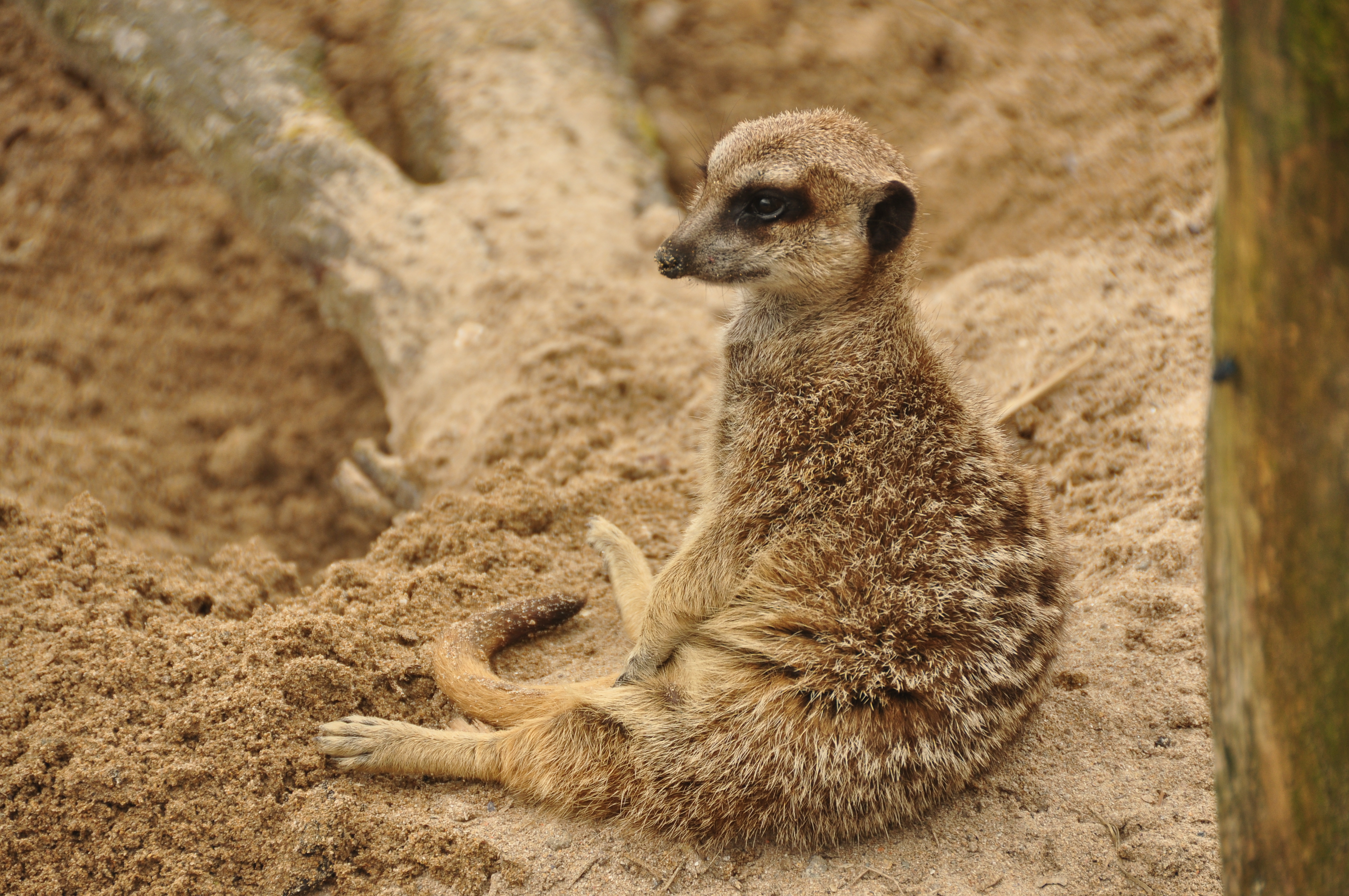
Meerkat

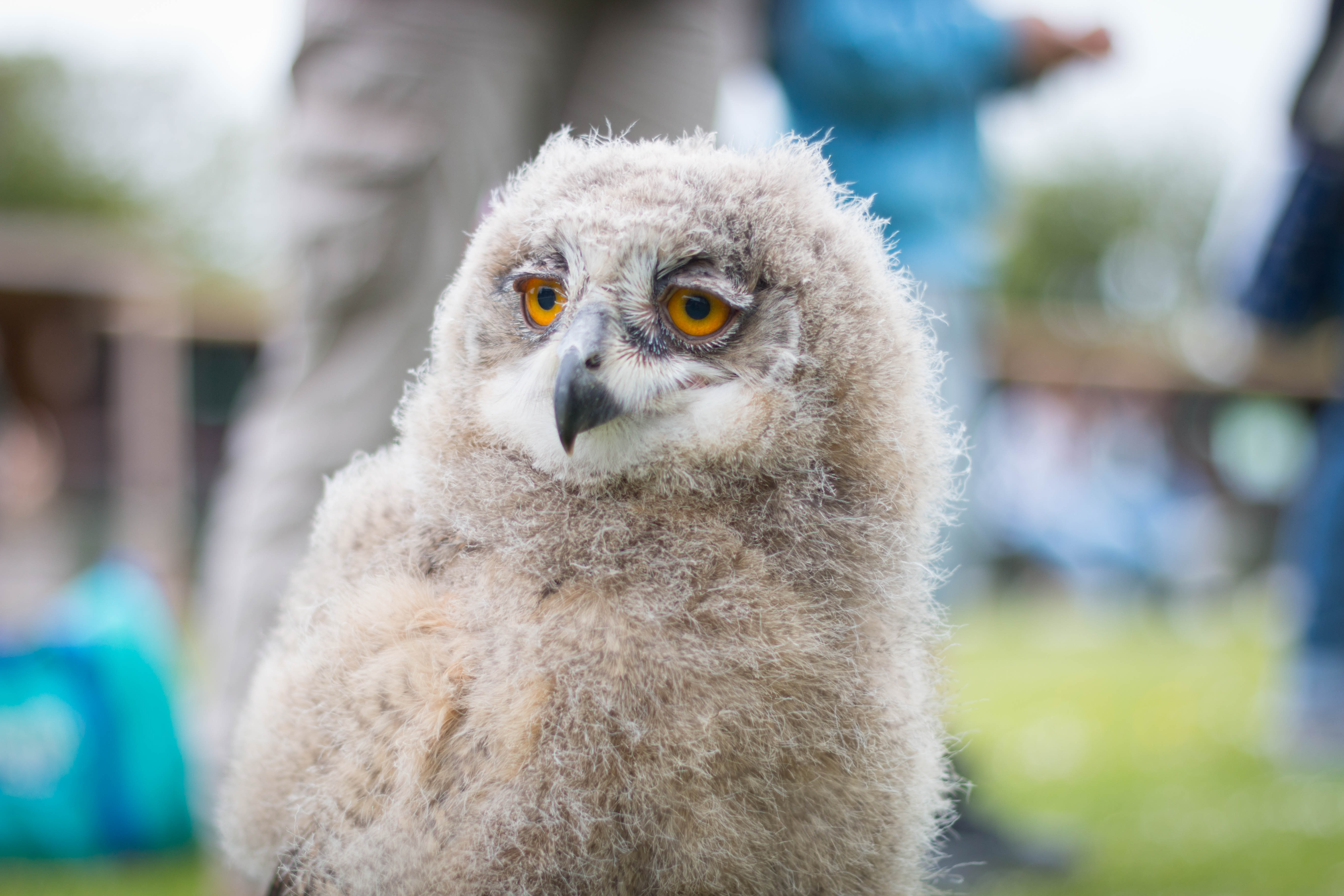
Eagle owl chick
