= William Mayow =

Mayor of St Columb Major executed after the Prayer Book Rebellion

William Mayow of Gluvian was the Mayor of St Columb Major, Cornwall, in the early 16th century. He is chiefly remembered for his execution in 1549 following the suppression of the Prayer Book Rebellion.

== Background ==
The Prayer Book Rebellion broke out in Devon and Cornwall in 1549, following the introduction of the Book of Common Prayer as part of the Protestant reforms of King Edward VI. Many Cornish people, who largely spoke the Cornish language and remained loyal to the traditional Catholic rites, viewed the English-language liturgy as an attack on their faith and identity.

After the rebellion was crushed by government forces, the Crown appointed Sir Anthony Kingston as Provost Marshal to punish those considered sympathetic to the rebels.

== Execution ==
According to local accounts, Mayow was seized and hanged outside a tavern in St Columb Major on Kingston's orders. His alleged offence was not a capital crime, but the reprisals carried out by Kingston were noted for their severity.

A Cornish tradition records that Mayow's wife, urged by friends to plead for his life, delayed too long preparing herself to meet the Marshal, taking time to dress “in her French hood” to appear more respectable. By the time she reached St Columb, her husband had already been executed.

Other Cornishmen hanged on Kingston's orders included Richard Bennett, vicar of St Veep, and Nicholas Boyer, mayor of Bodmin.

== Legacy ==
Mayow's death entered Cornish oral tradition as an example of the harsh reprisals inflicted on local leaders following the rebellion. Later historians, including Richard Carew and modern writers such as Philip Payton, have cited his story as emblematic of the Tudor government's brutal suppression of Cornish resistance.

== See also ==
- Prayer Book Rebellion
- Anthony Kingston
- St Columb Major
