= Ruthvoes =

Village in mid Cornwall, England

Coordinates: 50.40813°N 4.92239°W

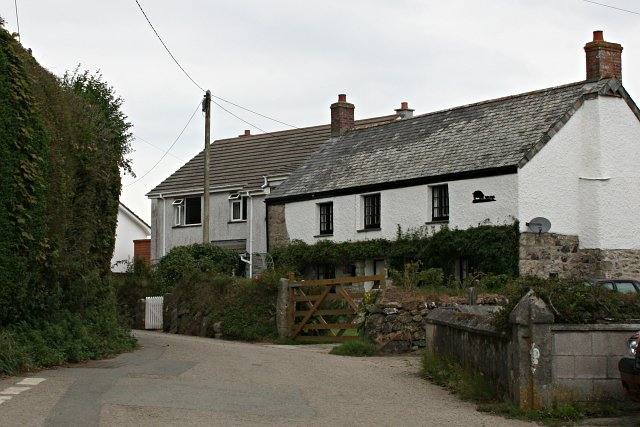
Cottages in Ruthvoes village

Ruthvoes (Cornish: Rudhfos) is a village in mid Cornwall, England, United Kingdom. It is in the parish of St Columb Major, about two miles (3 km) south of St Columb Major town and 6 1/2 miles (10.5 km) east of Newquay.

The village lies on the northwest edge of Goss Moor near the A30 dual carriageway trunk road. The Par to Newquay branch railway passes south of the settlement.

Ruthvoes is the location of the holy well of Saint Columba the virgin and, according to legend, is where she was beheaded.

== Notable people ==
Richard Bullock, miner, stockbroker; guard on the Deadwood stagecoach; born at Ruthvoes
