= Edward Hamley (poet) =

Edward Hamley (1764 (baptised) – 1834) was an English clergyman and poet.

== Life ==
He was the elder son of the Rev. Thomas Hamley of St. Columb, Cornwall, who was buried at Bodmin 11 June 1766, and was baptised at St. Columb Major 25 Oct. 1764. He matriculated from New College, Oxford, 6 November 1783, and took his Bachelor of Civil Law degree in 1791. He was elected a fellow of his college 5 November 1785, and then spent some time in Italy.

While residing in the Inner Temple, London, in 1795, he published a volume entitled Poems of Various Kinds, 1795. At this period he was in correspondence with Dr. Samuel Parr, by whom he was called "the learned Mr. Hamley of New College".

In 1795 he also printed anonymously Translations, chiefly from the Italian of Petrarch and Metastasio. In the same year he wrote seventeen sonnets, which were afterwards inserted in the Poetical Register and Repository of Fugitive Poetry, at intervals between 1805 and 1809. He became rector of Cusop, Herefordshire, in 1805, and of Stanton St. John, Oxfordshire, in 1806, which benefices he held to his death.

He died at Stanton 7 December 1834.
