= Mawgan Porth =

Beach and small settlement in north Cornwall, England

Coordinates: 50°28′N 5°02′W

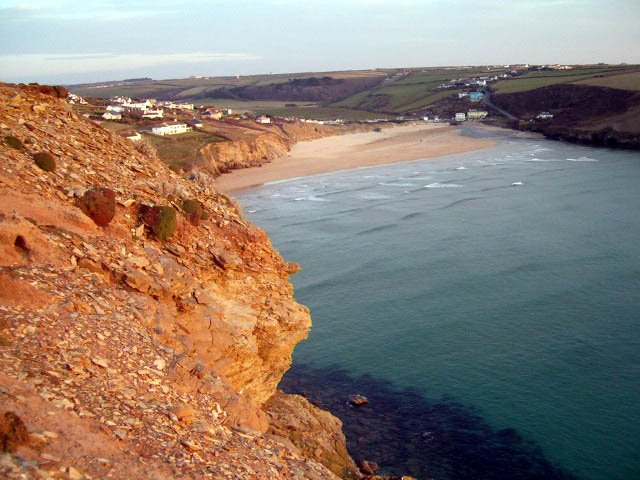
Mawgan Porth Beach (tide in)

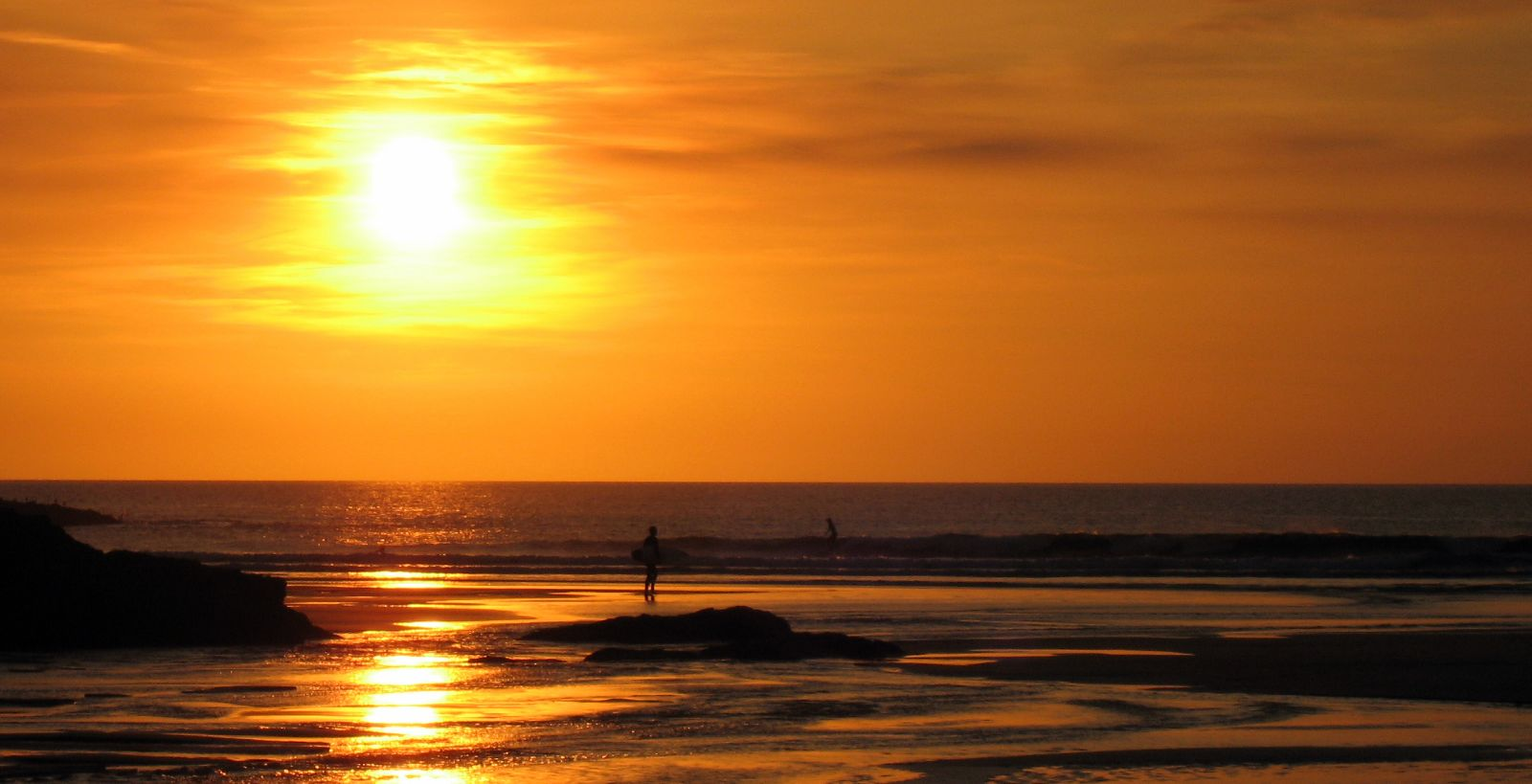
Surfers at Mawgan Porth at sunset

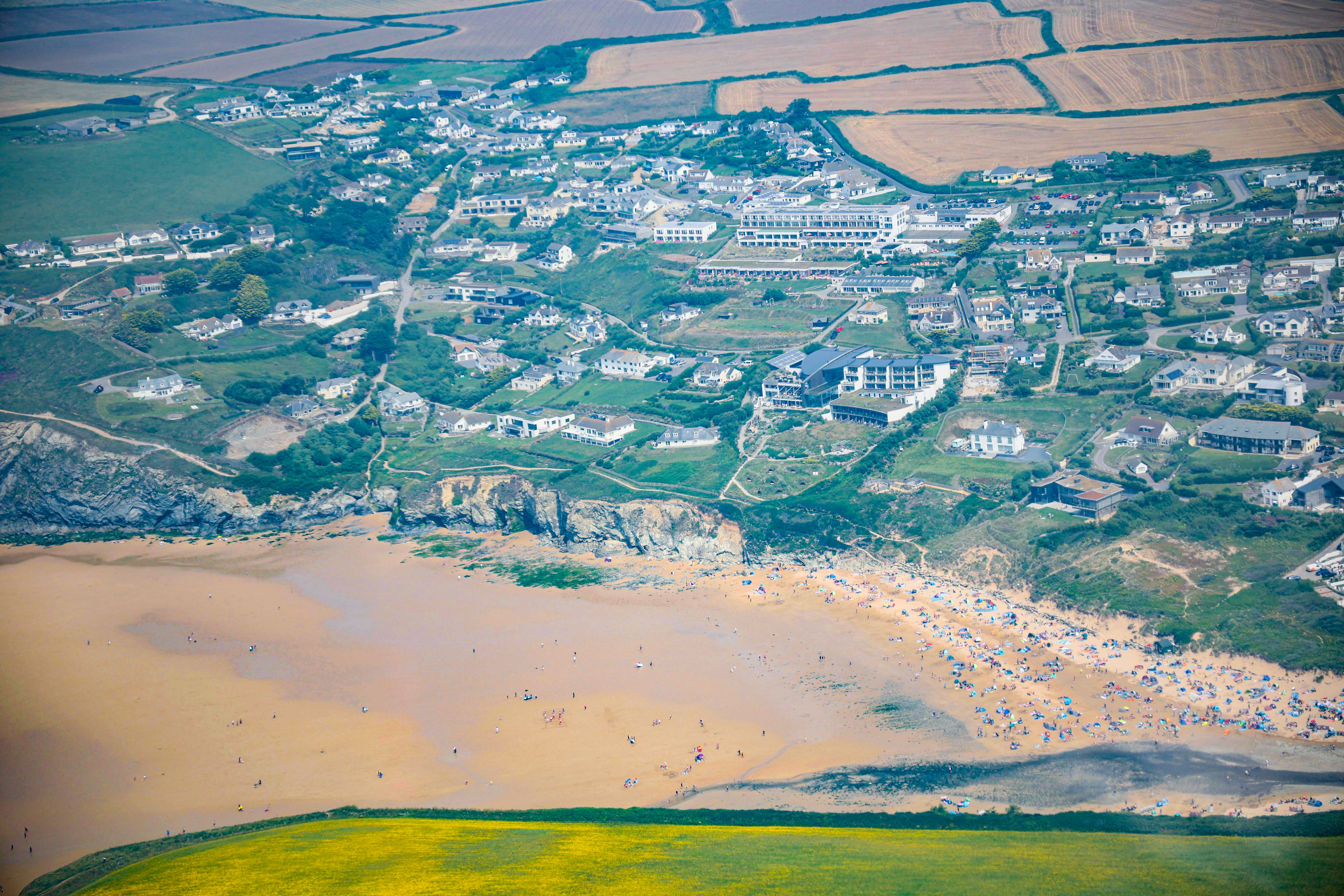
Mawgan Porth Beach

Mawgan Porth (Cornish: Porth Maugan, meaning "St. Mawgan's cove", or Porth Gluwyan, meaning "cove of the Gluvian River") is a beach and small settlement in north Cornwall, England. It is north of Watergate Bay, approximately four miles (6 km) north of Newquay, on the Atlantic Ocean coast.

Mawgan Porth is in the civil parish of Mawgan-in-Pydar, at the seaward end of the Vale of Lanherne (or Vale of Mawgan) where the River Menalhyl meets the sea. The hamlet consists of a pub, a general store, and several hotels, guest houses and caravan parks.

The sandy beach, backed by dunes with cliffs at each end, is quality-assessed and supervised by lifeguards during the summer. It is a popular surfing location. The South West Coast Path passes behind the beach and the area attracts holiday-makers.

There are a number of local holiday parks in Mawgan Porth. The oldest is Magic Cove Touring Park; Cosy Corner is nearest to the beach, and then Sun Haven Valley Holiday Park.

== History ==
In the years 1949–52, 1954 and 1974, archaeological excavations revealed a settlement comprising three groups of buildings ('courtyard houses') and a burial ground dating from around 850–1050. Finds included pottery and stone artefacts.

Mawgan Porth is recorded as Porthglyvyan in 1334, Cornish for cove of the little wooded valley river, and later as Porthmaugan in 1755, Cornish for cove of St Mawgan.

The German sculptor Faust Lang lived in Mawgan Porth from 1936 to 1949.
