= Trebudannon =

Hamlet in Cornwall, England

Coordinates: 50.412°N 4.963°W

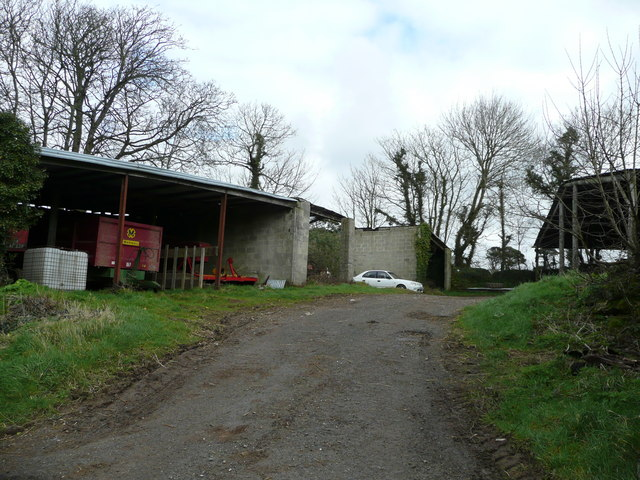
Farm buildings at Trebudannon

Trebudannon (Cornish: Trebydannan, meaning Bydannan's farmstead) is a hamlet situated one mile south-southwest of St. Columb Major in mid Cornwall, England, United Kingdom.

Point to point horse racing meets are staged twice a year in Trebudannon and Murtaya sports cars are constructed on a farm nearby.
