= Nine Maidens stone row =

Neolithic stone row in Cornwall, England

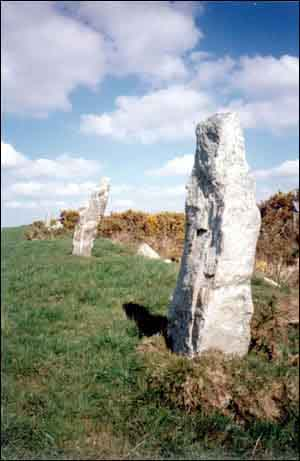
- Nine Maidens stone row

- Location within Cornwall
- 50°28′18″N 4°54′34″W
- Type: Stone row
- Periods: Neolithic / Bronze Age
- Location: St Columb Major, Cornwall

Scheduled monument
- Official name: The Nine Maidens stone alignment, The Fiddler standing stone and two Bronze Age round barrows
- Designated: 26 November 1928
- Reference no.: 1021223

Listed Building – Grade I
- Official name: Nine Maidens
- Designated: 10 February 1967
- Reference no.: 1144121

Nine Maidens stone row is an ancient monument in the parish of St Columb Major, Cornwall, England. The Nine Maidens (grid reference SW936675) are also known in Cornish as Naw-voz, or Naw-whoors meaning "the nine sisters". This late neolithic stone row is 2 miles (3.2 km) north of St Columb Major.

== Site description ==
The row comprises nine stone megaliths and is situated in a field alongside the A39 between St Columb Major and Wadebridge. The row is approximately 108 metres (354 ft) long, with stones varying in height from 0.8 metres (2.6 ft) (a stump) to 2.1 metres (6.9 ft). The northernmost stone is recumbent and broken. The stones are irregularly spaced and aligned in a north easterly direction. They are aligned towards a stone known as the Fiddler, which lies on the moorland approximately 800 metres away.

== Myth and legend ==
The local myth about the creation of the stones suggests that nine maidens were turned into stone as punishment for dancing on a Sunday. The Fiddler, a megalith some distance north of the row, is said to be the petrified remains of the musician who played for the dancers. These petrifaction legends are often associated with stone circles, and is reflected in the folk names of some of the nearby sites, for example The Hurlers and The Pipers on Bodmin Moor.

The stone row was first noted by historian Richard Carew in 1605. He said:-

"Wade bridge delivereth you into waste ground, where 9 long and great stones called The sisters stand in a ranke together, and seem to have been so pitched, for continuing the memory of somewhat, whose notice is yet envied us by time."

The stones were the inspiration for the Celtic opera Iernin by British composer George Lloyd. The opera, first performed in 1934 at the Pavilion in Penzance, tells the story of one of the Maidens who comes back to life as a fairy.
