= Talskiddy =

Village in Cornwall, England

Coordinates: 50°27′N 4°57′W

Talskiddy (Cornish: Talskeusi) is a small rural village about two miles north of St Columb Major in Cornwall, England, United Kingdom. Originally a manorial settlement belonging to the Earldom of Cornwall, the place prospered in the 19th century as a centre of the wool-combing industry.

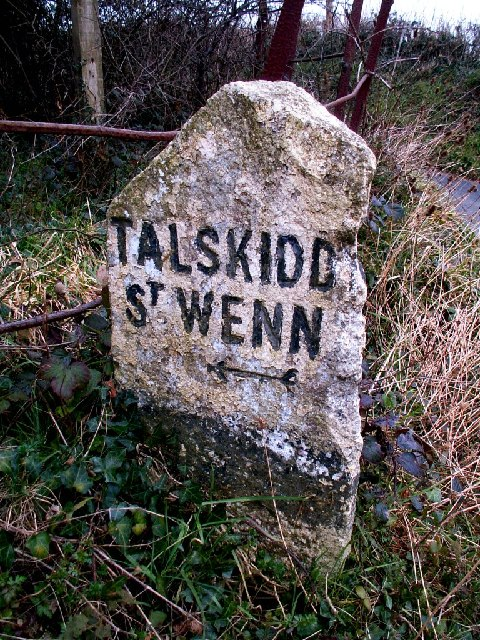
Granite guidestone between St Wenn and Talskiddy

== History ==
Talskiddy was once an ancient manor belonging to the Duchy of Cornwall. Previous to the formation of the Duchy, it was one of 17 manors belonging to the Earl of Cornwall. It is recorded that Richard, Earl of Cornwall purchased three Cornish acres at Talskiddy. These seventeen 'ancient manors' were known collectively as the Antiqua maneria. The manorial custom of "Free Bench" was practised here. It was once a centre for the woolcombing industry. Many of the older houses in the village are built of cob.

== Etymology ==
The meaning of the name is believed to be brow of the river Skeusi, from tal the Cornish word for brow, and Skeusi, the Cornish name of a river.

== Amenities ==
Talskiddy is probably one of the smallest villages in Cornwall, the only facilities being one red telephone box and a Victorian postbox. It is one of only a few villages in Cornwall that has a village green. It also has a duck pond, known by the residents as "the harbour". There was once a "kiddlywink" or beer shop in the village. Two woolcombing sheds remain, now converted to dwellings. Close by are the farming settlements of Rosedinnick, Pennatillie and Pencrennis. The nearest main roads are the A39 (Atlantic highway) which provides good links to North Cornwall, and the provides good A30 links to the rest of Cornwall.

== In literature ==
Daniel Defoe wrote a book about a man from Talskiddy called Dickory Cronke: The Dumb Philosopher: or, Great Britain's Wonder (1719). It is not clear whether Cronke was a real character, or the work of Defoe's imagination.

A true life character who lived at Talskiddy was George Hawke. He spent his early life working as a wool stapler for the Allanson family. He was a very determined man indeed. He was born in St Eval Parish on 2 October 1802 at his father's farm near Bedruthan. Following losses in an economic recession, George decided to emigrate to Australia. His words were recorded in a letter at age 70 years to a nephew back in Cornwall. The letter was later reproduced in full in Yvonne McBurney's book, The Road to Byng.

== Cornish wrestling ==
John Capell (1859-1932), from Talskiddy, was heavyweight Cornish wrestling champion of Cornwall in 1890 and 1898 and Champion of the West of England in 1890.
