= Tregatillian =

Hamlet in Cornwall, England

Coordinates: 50.430°N 4.925°W

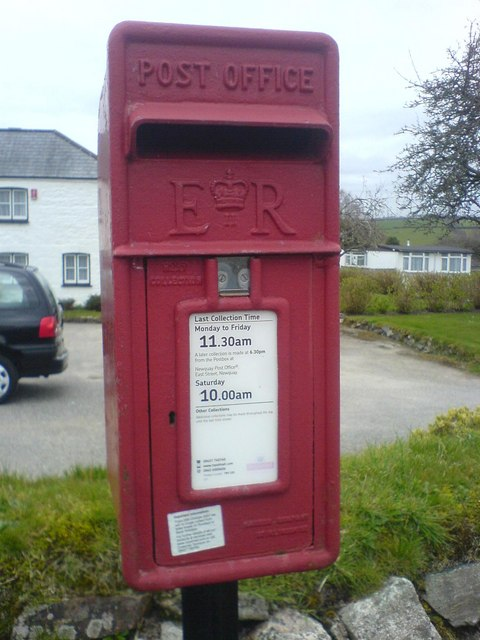
Tregatillian post box

Tregatillian is a hamlet immediately east of St. Columb Major in Cornwall, England, United Kingdom. The area is currently the site of a few traditional Cornish houses and a large residential mobile home site, Tregatillian Homes Park.

== Notable residents ==
Author Cyril Bencraft Joly once lived in the village.
