= Mary Kelly (playwright) =

British playwright and pageant maker

Mary Elfreda Kelly OBE (25 March 1888 – 5 November 1951) was a British playwright, pageant maker and founder of the Village Drama Society in 1919. Her family home was Kelly House in the village of Kelly, Devon.

== Early life ==
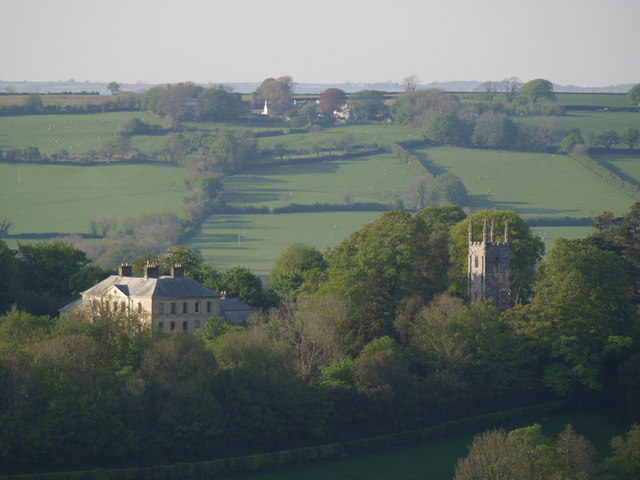
Kelly House and church, Kelly, Devon. Home of Mary Kelly

Mary Kelly was born at Salcombe vicarage in Devon on 25 March 1888 to the Reverend Maitland Kelly and his second wife Elfreda Blanche Carey. She was educated at home by a governess and at school at The Halsteads in East Sheen, London. During World War 1 she worked as a cook in a VAD hospital in Exeter and as a clerk in the War Office. After the war she returned home to Kelly House.

== Career ==
Theatrical performances were part of life at Kelly House and Kelly founded the Village Drama Society in January 1919 after seeing how much enjoyment the productions of the Kelly Players brought to those who took part; these productions included people from all parts of society regardless of their class or age, such as farm labourers.

Kelly was aware of the social changes occurring during the first decades of the twentieth century. In her book Village Theatre she charted the social change in villages as a result of mechanisation, the growth of materialism in the nineteenth century and from the war. These changes included the reduced power and wealth of the gentry, the waning of the influence of the church, the growth of the Women's Institutes (WI) improved education, the advent of radio and cinema, better bus services, and awareness of health and housing. Kelly was also aware that during the war men had travelled and become acquainted with theatre companies such as Lena Ashwell's touring company. With her enthusiasm for rural drama she traced the origins, history and state of village and rural theatre and entertainment in Britain and Europe citing the Oberammergau Passion Play as a genuine piece of community drama.

After the formation of the Kelly Drama Society other Village Drama Societies started to form and Kelly was called upon to advise them. Using the church newspapers to advertise the Society she was overwhelmed with the response from all over the country. By her own admission she knew nothing of the theatre or of running an organisation. With the writer Sir Arthur Quiller-Couch as the Society's first president Kelly set up a costume supply and plays for villages to use. With the Women's Institutes growing in importance in the post-war years, promoting education and greater social equality, Kelly used WI meetings to speak on and promote village drama.

The Village Drama Society moved its headquarters from Kelly House to Camberwell in London in 1924. When the Society amalgamated with the British Drama League in 1932 the League maintained Kelly as secretary of its Village Drama Section. She also became drama advisor for the Devon County Committee for Drama and Director of Drama at the University College of the South West, Exeter for its rural extension scheme.

Kelly wrote religious plays for the Kelly Drama Society, beginning with Joseph which was performed on Ascension Day in 1919. She continued to write plays for Ascension for about seven or eight years. The actors were able to maintain their Devon dialect. In 1926 she wrote and directed a historical pageant in Selborne based on Gilbert White's Natural History and Antiquities of Selborne. It was performed in the grounds of White's old home, The Wakes. The pageant was staged at The Wakes again in 1938. Other pageants followed at Rillington (1927), Bradstone (1929), Launceston (1931), Bude, and Exeter Cathedral ('The Pitifull Queene', 1932).

Her play The Mother was a described as "a sharply class-conscious two act drama that parallels the death of a young child with the futile losses of war".

When war broke out in 1939 Kelly moved to Exeter. In 1949 she emigrated to join a friend in South Africa where she did drama work with Europeans and Africans. She died on 5 November 1951 in Natal.

Kelly is recognised as an important figure in the history of British amateur drama.

== Honours and awards ==
Kelly received an OBE for her services to the British Drama League in 1949.

== Publications ==
- Antiquities of Selborne (1926)
- The Pageant of Bradstone (1929)
- The Simple Sketch: a Play for Women's Institutes (1930)
- Crossroads: a dramatic exercise (1931)
- On English Costume (1934)
- The Pump: a dramatic exercise (1934)
- The Mother: a play for women in one act (1936)
- How to make a Pageant (1936)
- Village Theatre (1939)
- Group Play-Making (1948)
