= Starvation =

Caloric intake below what is needed to maintain an organism's life

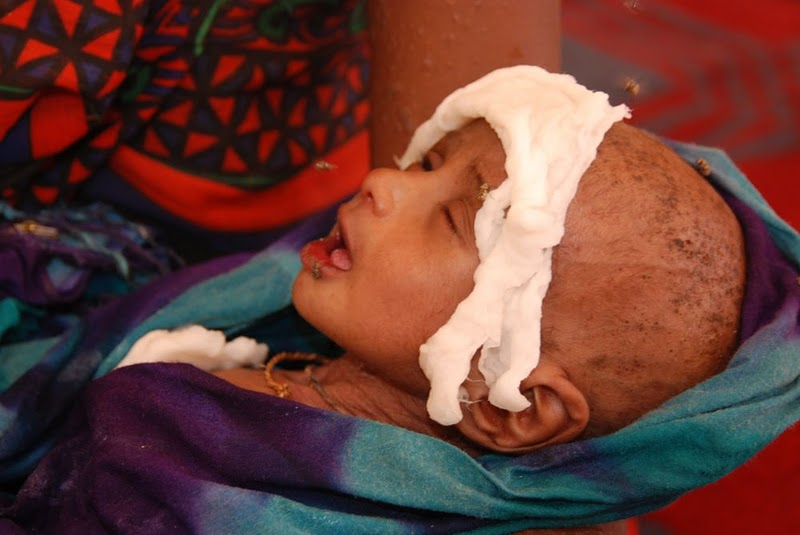
- A starved child in Somalia
- Specialty: Intensive care medicine
- Symptoms: Feeling weak or tired, lack of energy, loss of consciousness
- Complications: Anemia, low blood sugar, dangerously low blood pressure, organ failure
- Causes: Malnutrition
- Diagnostic method: Based on symptoms
- Treatment: Intensive care

Starvation is a severe deficiency in caloric energy intake, below the level needed to maintain an organism's life. It is the most extreme form of malnutrition. In humans, prolonged starvation can cause permanent organ damage and eventually, death. The term inanition refers to the symptoms and effects of starvation. Starvation may have a natural cause or be man-made. Deliberately inflicting starvation upon a population is a crime according to international criminal law and may also be used as a means of torture or execution.

According to the World Health Organization (WHO), hunger is the single gravest threat to the world's public health. The WHO also states that malnutrition is by far the biggest contributor to child mortality, present in half of all cases. Undernutrition is a contributory factor in the death of 3.1 million children under five every year. Recent studies demonstrate that global hunger levels have stabilized; however, despite some progress in specific areas such as stunting and exclusive breastfeeding, an alarming number of people still face food insecurity and malnutrition. In fact, the world has been set back 15 years, with levels of undernourishment similar to those in 2008-2009, with between 713 and 757 million people undernourished in 2023, and over 152 million more than in 2019 when the mid-range was 733 million.

The bloated stomach represents a form of malnutrition called kwashiorkor. The exact pathogenesis of kwashiorkor is not clear, as initially it was thought to relate to diets high in carbohydrates (e.g. maize) but low in protein. While many patients have low albumin, this is thought to be a consequence of the condition. Possible causes such as aflatoxin poisoning, oxidative stress, immune dysregulation, and altered gut microbiota have been suggested. Treatment can help mitigate symptoms such as the pictured weight loss and muscle wasting. However, prevention is of utmost importance.

Without any food, humans usually die in around 2 months. There was a case when someone survived over a year (382 days) under medical supervision. Lean people can usually survive with a loss of up to 18% of their body mass; obese people can tolerate more, possibly over 20%. Females may survive longer than males due to their higher body fat content at the same BMI.

== Signs and symptoms ==
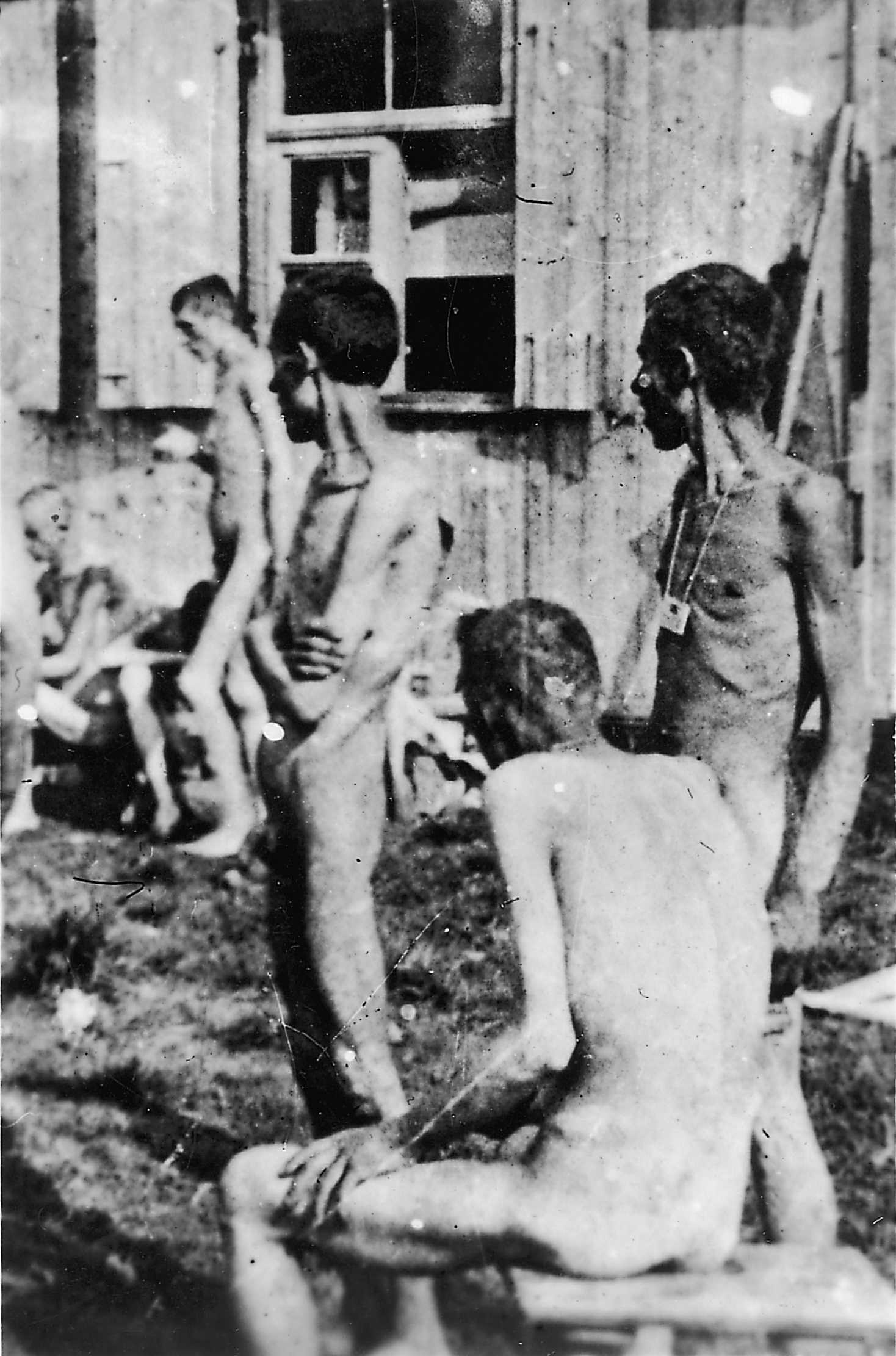
Buchenwald inmates, 16 April 1945 when camp was liberated

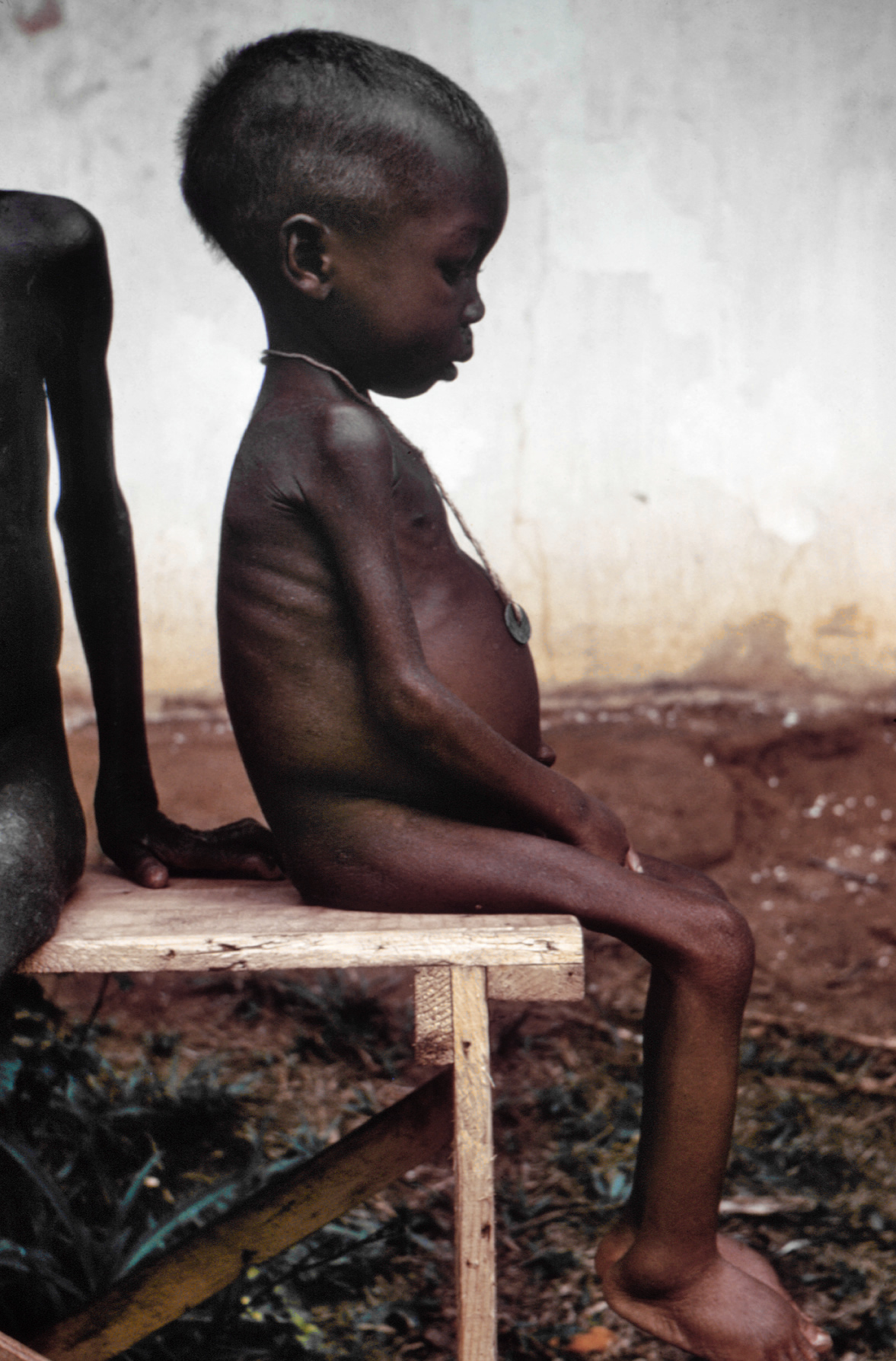
A girl during the Nigerian Civil War of the late 1960s, shown suffering the effects of severe hunger and malnutrition

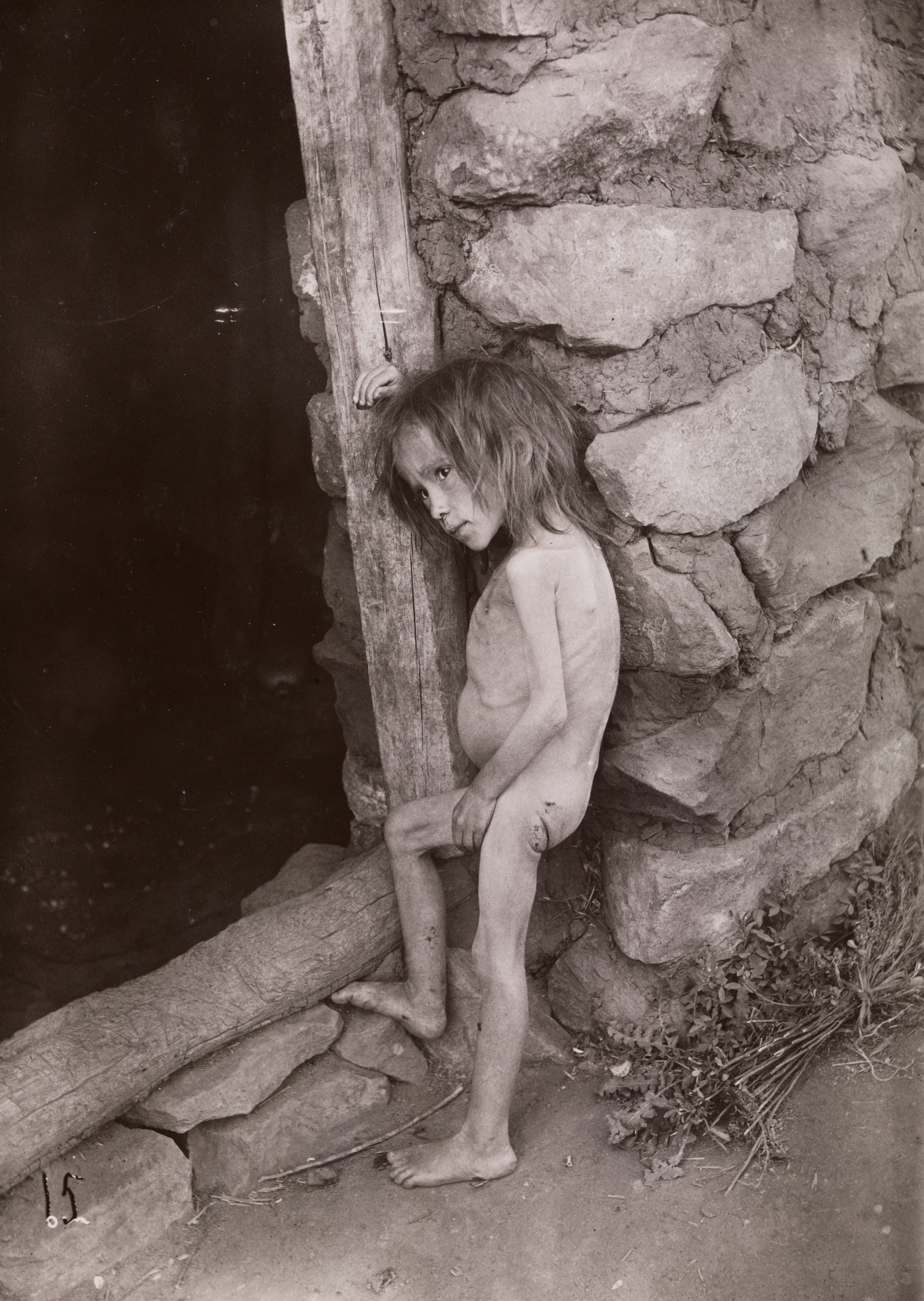
Starving Russian girl during the Russian famine of 1921–1922

The following are some of the symptoms of starvation:

=== Changes in behaviour or mental status ===
The beginning stages of starvation impact mental status and behaviours. These symptoms show up as irritable and/or unstable mood, fatigue, trouble concentrating, and preoccupation with food thoughts. People with those symptoms tend to be easily distracted and have no energy. Psychological effects are profound, including depression, anxiety, and a decrease in cognitive functions.

=== Physical signs ===
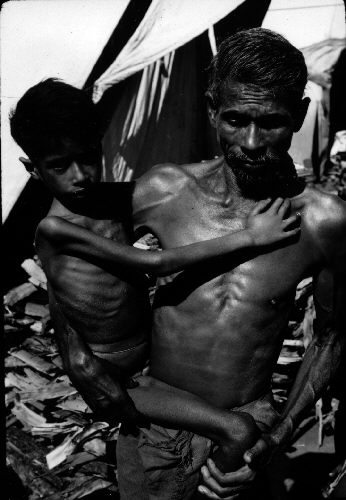
Photo from 1972 of an emaciated child and a man in India with marasmus

As starvation progresses, the physical symptoms set in. The timing of these symptoms depends on age, size, and overall health. It usually takes days to weeks, and includes weakness, fast heart rate, shallow breaths that are slowed, thirst, and constipation. There may also be diarrhea in some cases. The eyes begin to sink in and glass over. The muscles begin to become smaller and muscle wasting sets in. Tiredness and dizziness also commonly occur, especially from any physical task. The skin is often overly pale. One prominent sign in children is a swollen belly. Skin loosens and turns pale in color, and there may be swelling of the feet and ankles.

=== Weakened immune system ===
Symptoms of starvation may also appear as a weakened immune system, slow wound healing, and poor response to infection. Rashes may develop on the skin. The body directs any nutrients available to keeping organs functioning.

=== Other symptoms ===
Other effects of starvation may include:

- Anemia
- Gallstones
- Hypotension
- Stomach disease
- Cardiovascular and respiratory diseases
- Irregular or absent menstrual periods in women
- Kidney disease or failure
- Starvation Induced Hepatitis and/or reduced liver function causes:
- Electrolyte imbalance
- Emaciation
- Oliguria

=== Stages of starvation ===
The symptoms of starvation show up in three stages. Phase one and two can show up in anyone that skips meals, diets, and goes through fasting. Phase three is more severe, can be fatal, and results from long-term starvation.

Phase one: When meals are skipped, the body begins to maintain blood sugar levels by degrading glycogen in the liver and breaking down stored fat and protein. The liver can provide glucose for the first few hours. After that, the body begins to break down fat and protein. The body uses fatty acids as an energy source for muscles but lowers the amount of glucose sent to the brain. Another chemical that comes from fatty acids is glycerol. It can be used as glucose for energy but eventually runs out.

Phase two: Phase two can last for weeks at a time. In this phase, the body mainly uses stored fat for energy. The breakdown occurs in the liver and turns fat into ketones. After fasting for one week, the brain will use these ketones and any available glucose. Using ketones lowers the need for glucose, and the body slows the breakdown of proteins.

Phase three: By this point, the fat stores are gone, and the body begins to turn to stored protein for energy. This means it needs to break down muscle tissues full of protein; the muscles break down very quickly. Protein is essential for cells to work correctly, and when it runs out, the cells can no longer function.

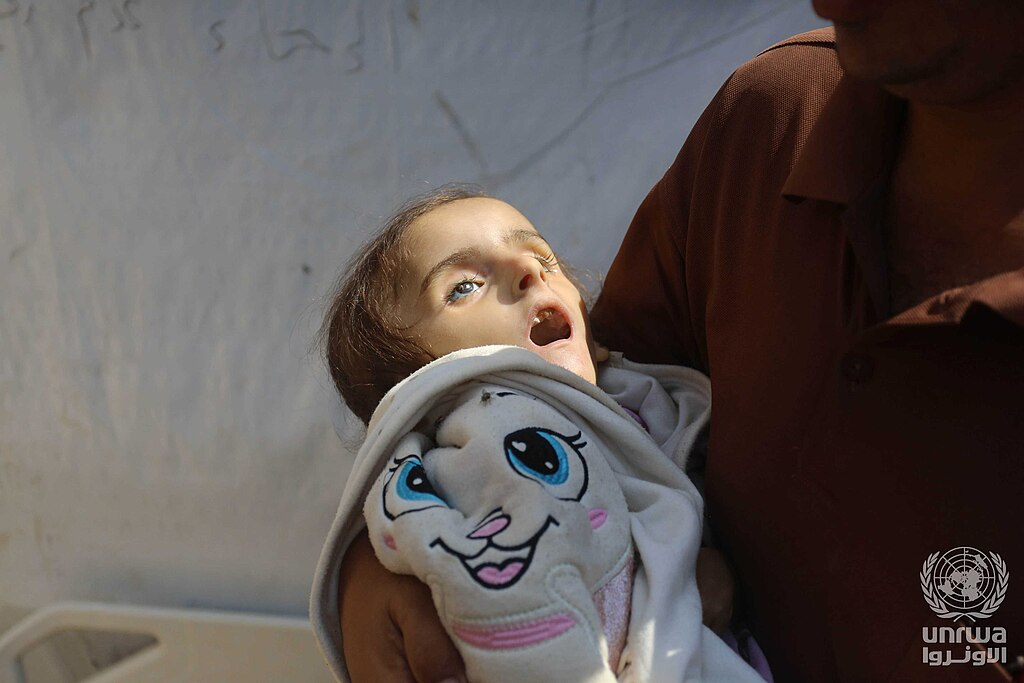
Four year old Palestinian girl starved to death, during Gaza Famine

The cause of death due to starvation is usually an infection or the result of tissue breakdown. This is due to the body becoming unable to produce enough energy to fight off bacteria and viruses. The final stage of starvation includes signals like hair color loss, skin flaking, swelling in the extremities, and a bloated belly. Even though they may feel hunger, people in the final stage of starvation usually cannot eat enough food to recover without significant medical intervention.

== Causes ==
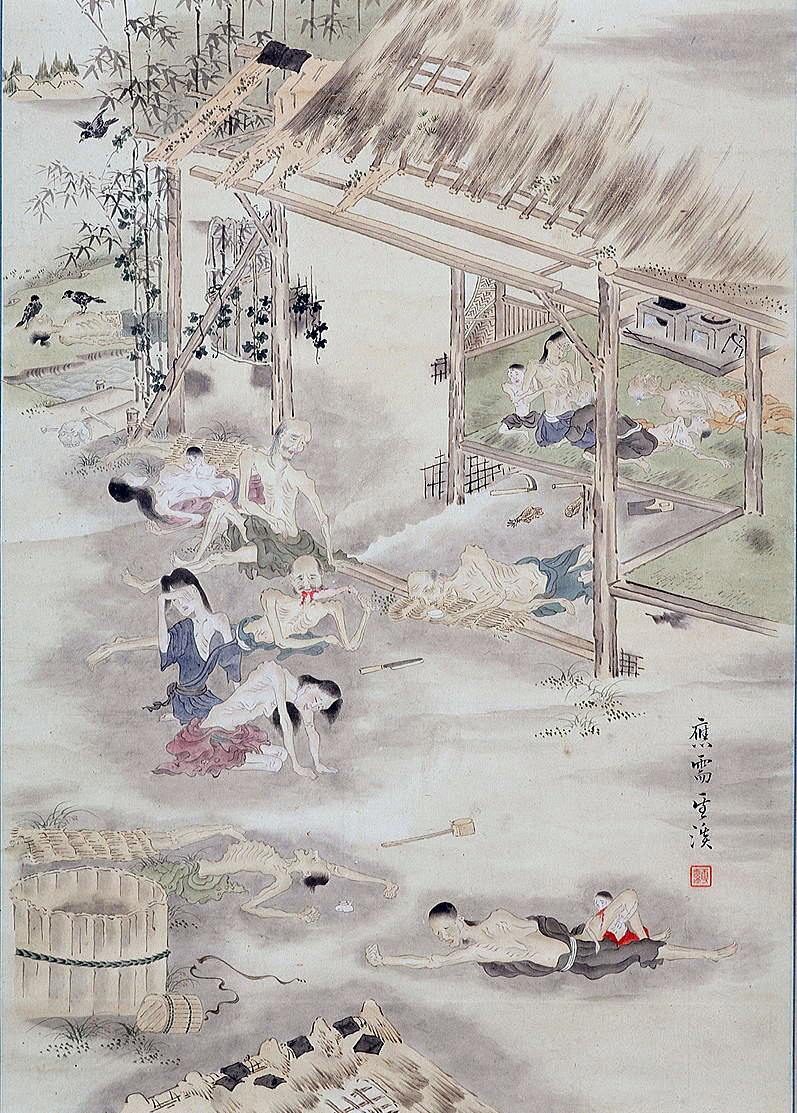
Starving peasants during the Great Tenmei famine in 18th century Japan

Starvation occurs when the body expends more energy than it takes in for an extended period of time. This imbalance can arise from one or more medical conditions or circumstantial situations, which can include:

Medical reasons

- Anorexia nervosa
- Bulimia nervosa
- Eating disorder, not otherwise specified
- Esophageal achalasia
- Celiac disease
- Coma
- Major depressive disorder
- Diabetes mellitus
- Digestive disease
- Constant vomiting

Circumstantial causes

- Child, elder, or dependent abuse
- Famine for any reason, such as political strife and war
- Hunger striking
- Excessive fasting
- Poverty
- Torture

== Biochemistry ==
With a typical high-carbohydrate diet, the human body relies on free blood glucose as its primary energy source. Glucose can be obtained directly from dietary sugars and by the breakdown of other carbohydrates. In the absence of dietary sugars and carbohydrates, glucose is obtained from the breakdown of stored glycogen. Glycogen is a readily-accessible storage form of glucose, stored in notable quantities in the liver and skeletal muscle.

After the exhaustion of the glycogen reserve, and for the next two to three days, fatty acids become the principal metabolic fuel. At first, the brain continues to use glucose. If a non-brain tissue is using fatty acids as its metabolic fuel, the use of glucose in the same tissue is switched off. Thus, when fatty acids are being broken down for energy, all of the remaining glucose is made available for use by the brain.

After two or three days of fasting, the liver begins to synthesize ketone bodies from precursors obtained from fatty acid breakdown. The brain uses these ketone bodies as fuel, thus cutting its requirement for glucose. After fasting for three days, the brain gets 30% of its energy from ketone bodies. After four days, this may increase to 70% or more. Thus, the production of ketone bodies cuts the brain's glucose requirement from 80 g per day to 30 g per day, about 35% of normal, with 65% derived from ketone bodies. But of the brain's remaining 30 g requirement, 20 g per day can be produced by the liver from glycerol (itself a product of fat breakdown). This still leaves a deficit of about 10 g of glucose per day that must be supplied from another source; this other source will be the body's own proteins.

After exhaustion of fat stores, the cells in the body begin to break down protein. This releases alanine and lactate produced from pyruvate, which can be converted into glucose by the liver. Since much of human muscle mass is protein, this phenomenon is responsible for the wasting away of muscle mass seen in starvation. However, the body is able to choose which cells will break down protein and which will not. About 2–3 g of protein has to be broken down to synthesize 1 g of glucose; about 20–30 g of protein is broken down each day to make 10 g of glucose to keep the brain alive. However, this number may decrease the longer the fasting period is continued, in order to conserve protein.

Starvation ensues when the fat reserves are completely exhausted and protein is the only fuel source available to the body. Thus, after periods of starvation, the loss of body protein affects the function of important organs, and death results, even if there are still fat reserves left. In a leaner person, the fat reserves are depleted faster, and the protein, sooner, therefore death occurs sooner. Ultimately, the cause of death is in general cardiac arrhythmia or cardiac arrest, brought on by tissue degradation and electrolyte imbalances. Conditions like metabolic acidosis may also kill starving people.

== Prevention ==
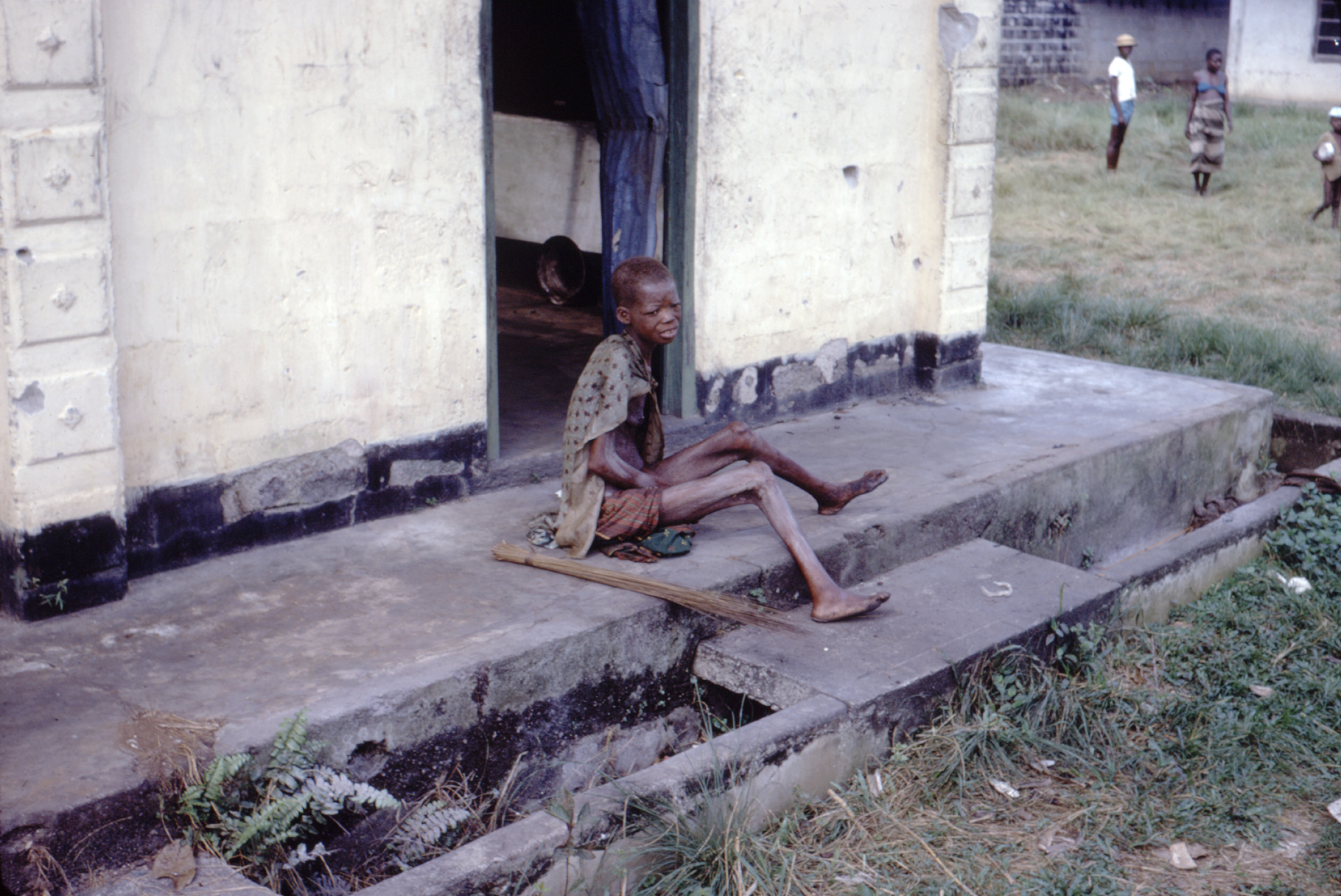
Starving woman during the blockade of Biafra, an event that contributed significantly to the criminalization of starvation

Starvation can be caused by factors beyond the control of the individual. The Rome Declaration on World Food Security outlines several policies aimed at increasing food security and, consequently, preventing starvation. These include:

- Poverty reduction
- Prevention of wars and political instability
- Food aid
- Agricultural sustainability
- Reduction of economic inequality

Supporting farmers in areas of food insecurity through such measures as free or subsidized fertilizers and seeds increases food harvest and reduces food prices.

Starvation is commonly used as a method of warfare, however, it has been outlawed and is now a crime. Notable incidents in history include the blockade of Germany, blockade of Biafra, and the ongoing blockade of Gaza.

== Treatment ==
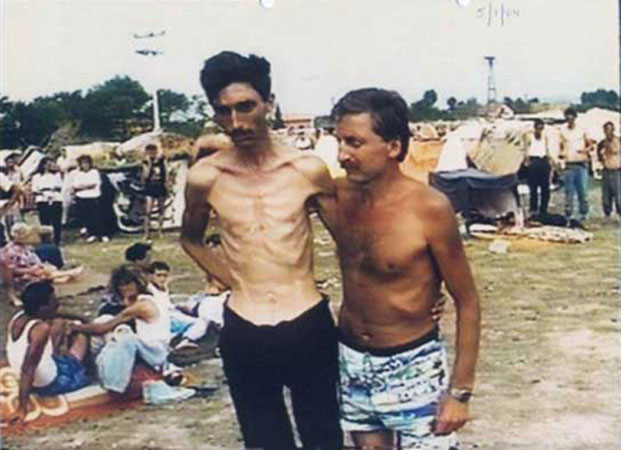
A starving man being assisted at Trnopolje camp in Bosnia.

Patients that suffer from starvation can be treated, but this must be done cautiously to avoid refeeding syndrome. Rest and warmth must be provided and maintained. Food can be given gradually in small quantities. The quantity of food can be increased over time. Proteins may be administered intravenously to raise the level of serum proteins. For worse situations, hospice care and opioid medications can be used.

=== Organizations ===
Many organizations have been highly effective at reducing starvation in different regions. Aid agencies give direct assistance to individuals, while political organizations pressure political leaders to enact more macro-scale policies that will reduce famine and provide aid.

== Statistics ==
Percentage of population suffering from hunger, World Food Programme, 2020: < 2.5% < 5.0% 5.0–14.9% 15.0–24.9% 25.0–34.9% > 35.0% No data

According to estimates by the Food and Agriculture Organization, between 720 and 811 million people were affected by hunger globally in 2020. This was a decrease from estimated 925 million in 2010 and roughly 1 billion in 2009. In 2007, 923 million people were reported as being undernourished, an increase of 80 million since 1990–92. An estimated 820 million people did not have enough to eat in 2018, up from 811 million in the previous year, which is the third year of increase in a row.

As the definitions of starving and malnourished people are different, the number of starving people is different from that of malnourished. Generally, far fewer people are starving than are malnourished.

The proportion of malnourished and starving people in the world has been more or less continually decreasing for at least several centuries. This is due to an increasing supply of food and to overall gains in economic efficiency. In 40 years, the proportion of malnourished people in the developing world has been more than halved. The proportion of starving people has decreased even faster.

Year	1970	1980	1990	2004	2007	2009
Proportion of undernourished people in the less-developed world	37 %	28 %	20 %	16 %	17 %	16 %

== Capital punishment ==
Historically, starvation has been used as a death sentence. From the beginning of civilization to the Middle Ages, people were immured, and died for want of food.

In ancient Greco-Roman societies, starvation was sometimes used to dispose of guilty upper-class citizens, especially erring female members of patrician families. In the year 31, Livilla, the niece and daughter-in-law of Tiberius, was discreetly starved to death by her mother for her adulterous relationship with Sejanus and for her complicity in the murder of her own husband, Drusus the Younger.

Another daughter-in-law of Tiberius, named Agrippina the Elder (a granddaughter of Augustus and the mother of Caligula), also died of starvation, in 33 AD; however, it is unclear if her starvation was self-inflicted.

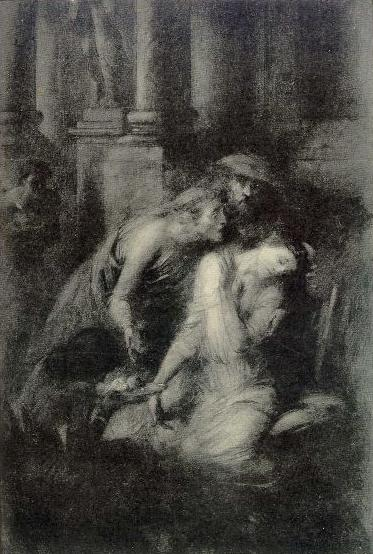
The starving Livilla refusing food. From a drawing by André Castagne.

A son and daughter of Agrippina were also executed by starvation for political reasons; Drusus Caesar, her second son, was put in prison in 33 AD, and starved to death by orders of Tiberius (he managed to stay alive for nine days by chewing the stuffing of his bed); Agrippina's youngest daughter, Julia Livilla, was exiled on an island in 41 by her uncle, Emperor Claudius, and her death by starvation was arranged by the empress Messalina.

It is also possible that Vestal Virgins were starved when found guilty of breaking their vows of celibacy.

Ugolino della Gherardesca, his sons, and other members of his family were immured in the Muda, a tower of Pisa, and starved to death in the thirteenth century. Dante, his contemporary, wrote about Gherardesca in his masterpiece The Divine Comedy.

In Sweden in 1317, King Birger of Sweden imprisoned his two brothers for a coup they had staged several years earlier (Nyköping Banquet). According to legend they died of starvation a few weeks later, since their brother had thrown the prison key in the castle moat.

In Cornwall in the UK in 1671, John Trehenban from St Columb Major was condemned to be starved to death in a cage at Castle An Dinas for the murder of two girls.

The Makah, a Native American tribe inhabiting the Pacific Northwest near the modern border of Canada and the United States, practiced death by starvation as a punishment for slaves.

== See also ==
- 2007–2008 world food price crisis
- Anorexia mirabilis
- Cachexia
- Global Hunger Index
- Starvation mode
- Famine scales
- Hunger strike
- List of famines
- List of people who died of starvation
- Marasmus
- Protein poisoning
