= Mary Kelly =

Mary Kelly may refer to:

- Mary Jane Kelly (1863–1888), widely believed to be the fifth and final victim of Jack the Ripper
- Mary Kelly (writer) (1927–2017), Scottish writer
- Mary Kelly (artist) (born 1941), American artist and writer
- Mary Kelly (gymnast) (1907–1986), British Olympic gymnast
- Mary Kelly (journalist) (1926–2005?), American journalist
- Mary Kelly (politician) (born 1952), Irish Labour Party politician, member of the 20th Seanad
- Mary Beth Kelly, justice on the Michigan Supreme Court
- Mary Eva Kelly (1826–1910), Irish poet and writer
- Mary Louise Kelly (born 1971), National Public Radio's senior Pentagon correspondent
- Mary Kelly (playwright) (1888–1951), British playwright, pageant maker and founder of the Village Drama Society
- Mary Jane Kelly (band), an Australian hardcore band
