= Castle Dor =

1961 novel by Daphne du Maurier

- First edition (UK)
- Author: Daphne du Maurier, Arthur Quiller-Couch
- Language: English
- Genre: Historical novel
- Publisher: J. M. Dent (UK); Doubleday (US)
- Publication date: 1961
- Publication place: United Kingdom
- Media type: Print (Hardback)

Castle Dor is a 1961 historical novel by Daphne du Maurier and Sir Arthur Quiller-Couch, set in 19th century Cornwall.

== Plot introduction ==
Castle Dor began life as the unfinished last novel by Sir Arthur Quiller-Couch, the celebrated 'Q', and was passed by his daughter to Daphne du Maurier. The story is based around the legend of Tristan and Iseult, but set in 19th century Cornwall. The main characters are a Breton onion seller, called Amyot Trestane, and the newly-wed Linnet Lewarne.

== Real placenames mentioned ==
- Castle Dore - ancient earthworks near Fowey
- Castle An Dinas ancient earthworks near St Columb Major
- Indian Queens village in St Enoder parish.
- Fowey - renamed Troy
- Tresaddern - A farm near St Columb Major
