= Village Drama Society =

British theatre organisation

The Village Drama Society was founded in 1919 by Mary Kelly in the village of Kelly in Devon, England. Its purpose was to promote the production of plays in villages, develop the arts in country areas, encourage playwrighting and offer the opportunity for historical and literary study.

== History ==
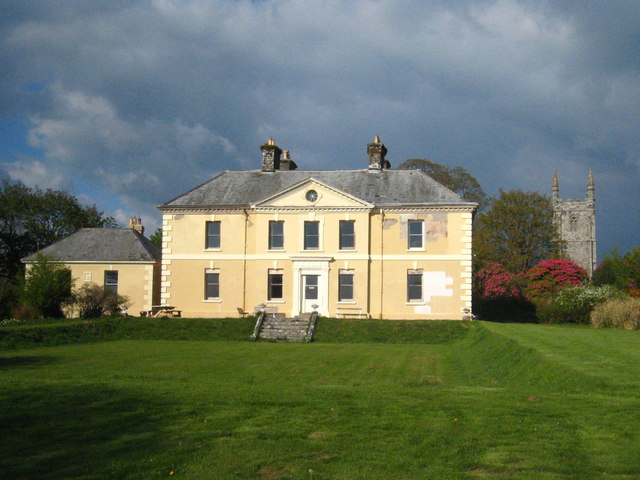
Kelly House, Kelly, Devon where Mary Kelly founded the Village Drama Society

Mary Kelly founded the Society after seeing how drama performed by the Kelly Players in the village of Kelly brought enjoyment to those who took part. The Society initially had its headquarters at the family home, Kelly House, though by 1924 it had moved to London. Its first president was the writer and literary critic Sir Arthur Quiller-Couch. He was succeeded by the playwright and poet Gordon Bottomley.

By 1921 the Society had 40 branches in England and Wales. Kelly travelled the country promoting the Society to Women's Institutes. It continued to grow rapidly. In 1925 it had 146 branches and by the following year this had increased to 210 branches of which nine were county groups of Women's Institutes and thirteen were junior groups. In 1930 there were 400 branches with 150 affiliated to the British Drama League.

In 1926, the Society ran a two week long summer school in Bath directed by the actress Gwen Lally. The programme included training in rehearsals, theatre production, playwrighting, lectures and performances. A second summer school in 1927, also directed by Gwen Lally, was held at the New Earswick model garden village near York and productions of classical, Shakesperian and modern plays were mounted. Two summer schools were planned in 1928, the first in Cheltenham. In 1930 the Society visited the Oberammergau Passion Play instead of holding the annual summer school.

In 1931 to 1932 the Society amalgamated with the British Drama League. The Society's activities were to be carried out by a Village Drama Section of the League, with Mary Kelly as its secretary. The League carried on the work begun by Mary Kelly who had done much to preserve dialect in Britain and ensure flourishing rural drama.

== Operations ==
The Society was run as a voluntary organisation, paid no salaries or rents in its first six years of operation and received money from donations and a grant from the Carnegie Trust for costuming. In 1928 the committee appealed in The Times for capital to buy a suitable building for the Society and for subscriptions and donations.

The Society fostered drama in several ways. It published lists of plays which it recommended for village productions; these included secular, religious and children's plays. Trainers were available to help villages who needed help to mount a production. A costume cupboard stocked a wide variety of costumes from nativity to Eastern and period costumes.

Local dramatists were encouraged to write plays with the purpose of promoting the many characters, traditions, speech and dialects of Britain. A playwrighting competition was also instituted. In the ninth competition in 1932 there were four classes of plays: a one act "thriller" for men; a translation of a European language play; one act plays for a few characters; and full-length plays.
