= Veronica Volkersz =

British World War II aviator (1917–2000)

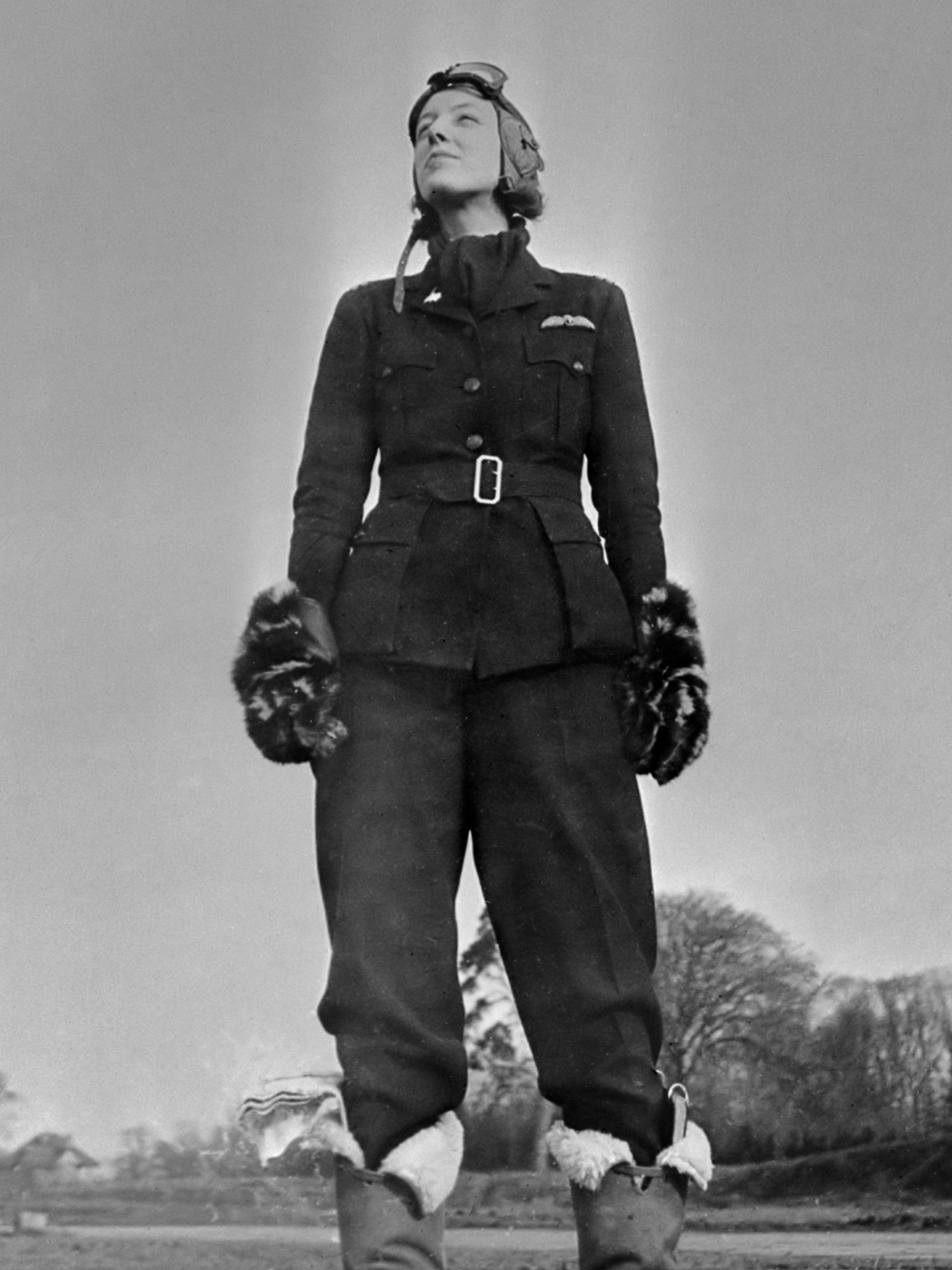
- Volkersz c. 1940–1945
- Born: Veronica May Innes; 17 April 1917; Chesterton, Cambridge, England
- Died: 13 December 2000 (aged 83); Cambridge, England
- Occupation: Aviator
- Spouse: Gerard Volkersz (m. 1944)

Veronica May Volkersz (née Innes; 1917–2000) was a British aviator and beauty queen. She flew for the RAF's Air Transport Auxiliary in the Second World War and was the first British woman to fly an operational jet fighter when she ferried a Meteor from the Gloster factory to RAF Moreton Valence on 15 September 1945.

== Early life ==
Veronica May Innes was born in Chesterton, Cambridge, on 17 April 1917. Her father was G. V. d'A. Innes – a professional soldier who rose to the rank of Major. When he served with the Royal Scots Fusiliers in India, she spent several summers in the Himalayan city of Srinigar, which she much preferred to her boarding school life in England.

In 1934, she participated in a grand pageant at Runnymede which was organised by Gwen Lally to celebrate English democracy, Magna Carta and to raise money for charity. This lasted for eight days and she was the Queen of Beauty on four of those days, taking the role of the Fair Maid of Kent.

She was an enthusiastic horse rider and car driver, going hunting and racing an open-topped Aston Martin sports car. She discovered aviation at Brooklands in 1938 and then learnt to fly with the Civil Air Guard, going solo at Cambridge airfield on 13 February 1939. This then caused headlines in the local press, "Beauty Queen Joins Civil Air Guard".

== Second World War ==
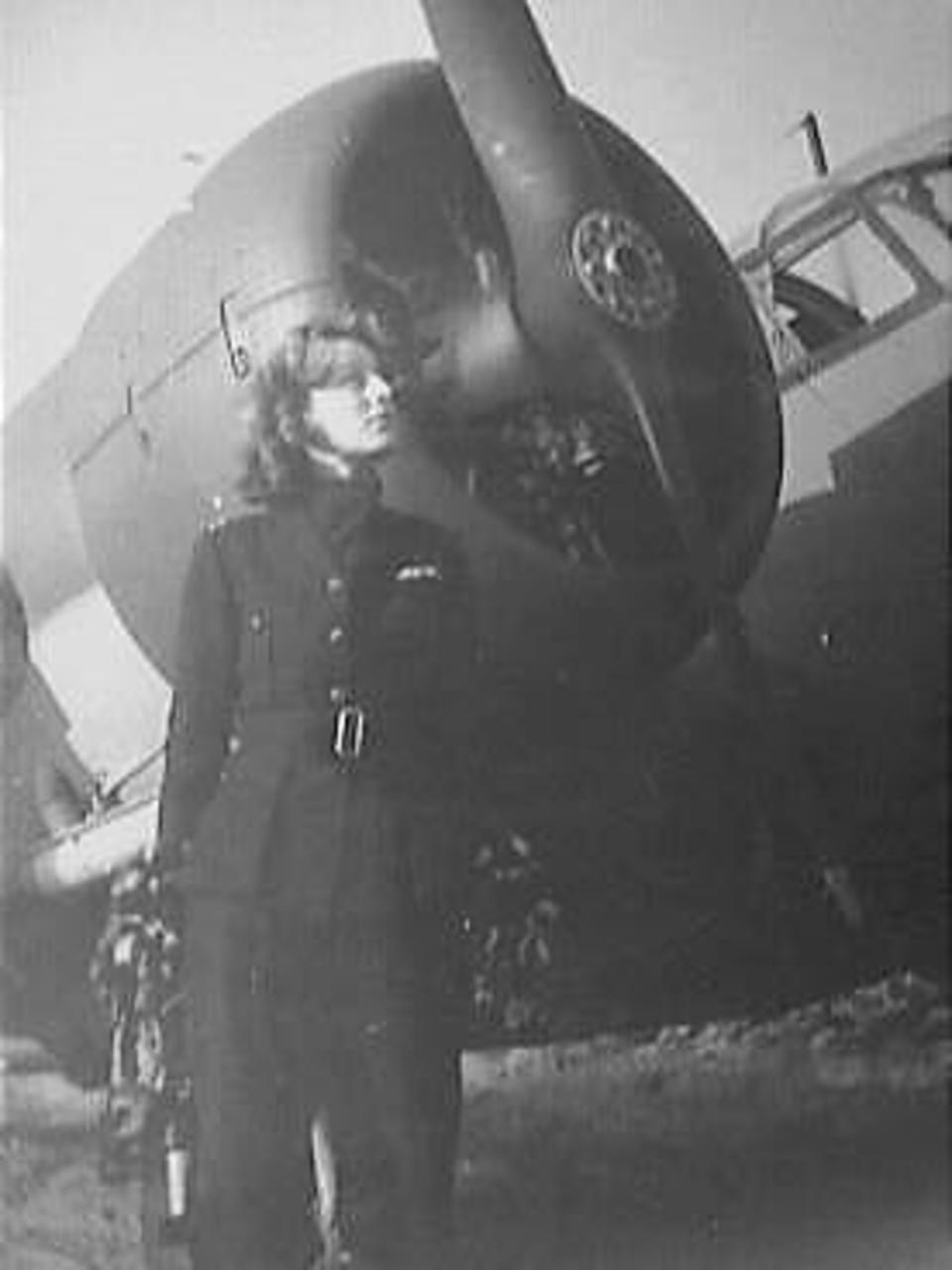
Volkersz in 1943

In the summer of 1939, she encountered preparations for war while flying out of Woodley Aerodrome on her first solo cross-country flight. These were barrage balloons which were being tested at RAF Cardington. She avoided these but then wind and mist caused her to become lost. She landed at a small airfield which proved to be RAF Wyton. She was then able to get her bearings and followed a railway line to the destination of Cambridge.

The Air Transport Auxiliary (ATA) was formed in 1939 and eight women were first allowed to fly for this at the start of 1940. Veronica was driving ambulances for the Voluntary Aid Detachment while living in London with her father who was then working for MI5. She wrote to ATA as soon as she saw the coverage in the press but was not accepted immediately as she had not logged enough flying hours. She persisted and was given a trial at Hatfield Aerodrome in 1940. She performed well but was still not accepted until March 1941, when she started training at Hatfield with other new recruits such as Honor Pitman. After a month of training, she passed a flying test at the ATA HQ of White Waltham and was commissioned as a second officer.

She had been flying Tiger Moths but then converted to more powerful aircraft. This started with the Hawker Audax in which she found that she needed a cushion to reach the controls. She then mastered the Hawker Hind, the North American Harvard and the Fairey Battle light bomber. Finally, she completed the conversion course by flying the Hawker Hurricane – "it's like an Audax with about five hundred times more guts", she told a fellow trainee.

She ferried Hurricanes while still new to the type. In late 1941, she was ferrying a Hurricane to Squires Gate Airport when fog caused a near miss with another aircraft. The evasive manoeuvre put the Hurricane into a dive and it was so difficult to pull out in time that the aircraft brought down the airfield's telegraph wires. New Hurricanes were generally quite difficult with especially stiff undercarriages and unreliable brakes. In the cold January 1942, she was ferrying a Hurricane to Ratcliffe Aerodrome when the windscreen iced up. She had to open the canopy to the icy blizzard to make out the runway and so managed to land it. But while taxiing, the wind caught the plane and flipped it forward onto its nose. She survived but the Accidents Committee found this to be her fault.

In April 1942, she converted to fly light twin-engined planes, starting with the comparatively sedate Airspeed Oxford. Conversion to heavy twins like the Wellington then followed but she didn't like these. "It's like flying around in a pair of railway carriages", she complained, "No finesse required whatsoever." She needed four cushions to fly the Wellington, and had to lie almost flat on her back.

In October 1942, she was posted to Hamble. She then appeared in a film about the ATA shot by the Crown Film Unit at Pinewood Studios. In 1943, she did the Class 4 Plus conversion, which allowed her to fly the Hudson and Mosquito. She was then allowed to fly the powerful Typhoon too. She enjoyed this type, cruising at 300 mph, and delivered about a hundred of them.

In March 1944, she was promoted to Flight Captain. At the end of the war, she was assigned to an invasion pool of pilots at White Waltham. She was still ferrying new aircraft and was the first woman to fly an operational jet fighter – a Gloster Meteor which she took to RAF Moreton Valence. The jets were simpler to operate than a variable-pitch propeller but intense when at the full throttle of 16,500 rpm – "an almighty kick in the pants".

== Personal life ==
In June 1942, she became engaged to Gerard Volkersz – a flying officer in the Royal Netherlands Naval Air Service, who served in the Fleet Air Arm after the fall of the Netherlands. They married at Chelsea Register Office and, in 1947, she gave birth to a son but he was stillborn. Her marriage then broke up and she did not remarry. Instead, she pursued a career in aviation, working as a freelance pilot. One contract in 1948 was to fly Tempest fighters from Langley to Pakistan – a distance of about five thousand miles.
