= Castle Dore =

Iron Age hillfort in Cornwall, UK

- Kastel Dor (Cornish)
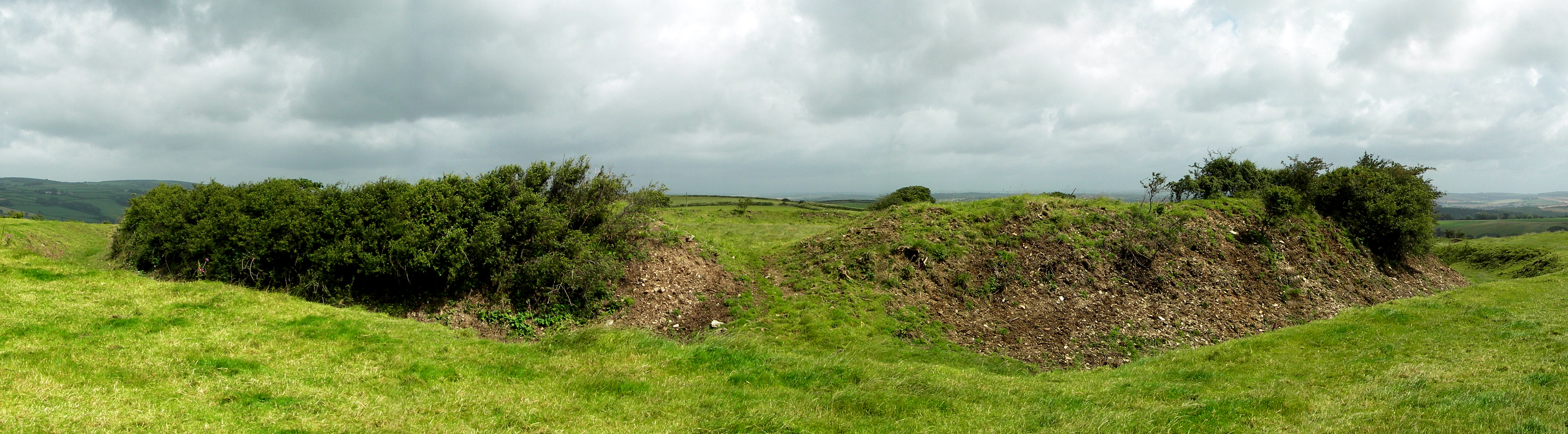
- Panorama of Castle Dore
- Interactive map of Castle Dore
- 50.36246°N 4.66852°W
- Location: Cornwall, United Kingdom

Site notes
- Area: ~4,900 square metres (53,000 sq ft)

Scheduled monument
- Official name: Small multivallate hillfort called Castle Dore
- Designated: 13 December 1929
- Reference no.: 1006691

Castle Dore (or Castle Dôr) (Cornish: Kastel Dor, meaning earth castle) is an Iron Age hill fort (ringfort) near Golant in Cornwall, in the United Kingdom located at grid reference SX103548. It was probably occupied from the 5th or 4th centuries BC until the 1st century BC. It consists of two ditches surrounding a circular area 79 metres (259 ft) in diameter. Excavated in the 1930s, it is one of the most intensively investigated Iron Age hillforts in Cornwall.

== Description and history ==
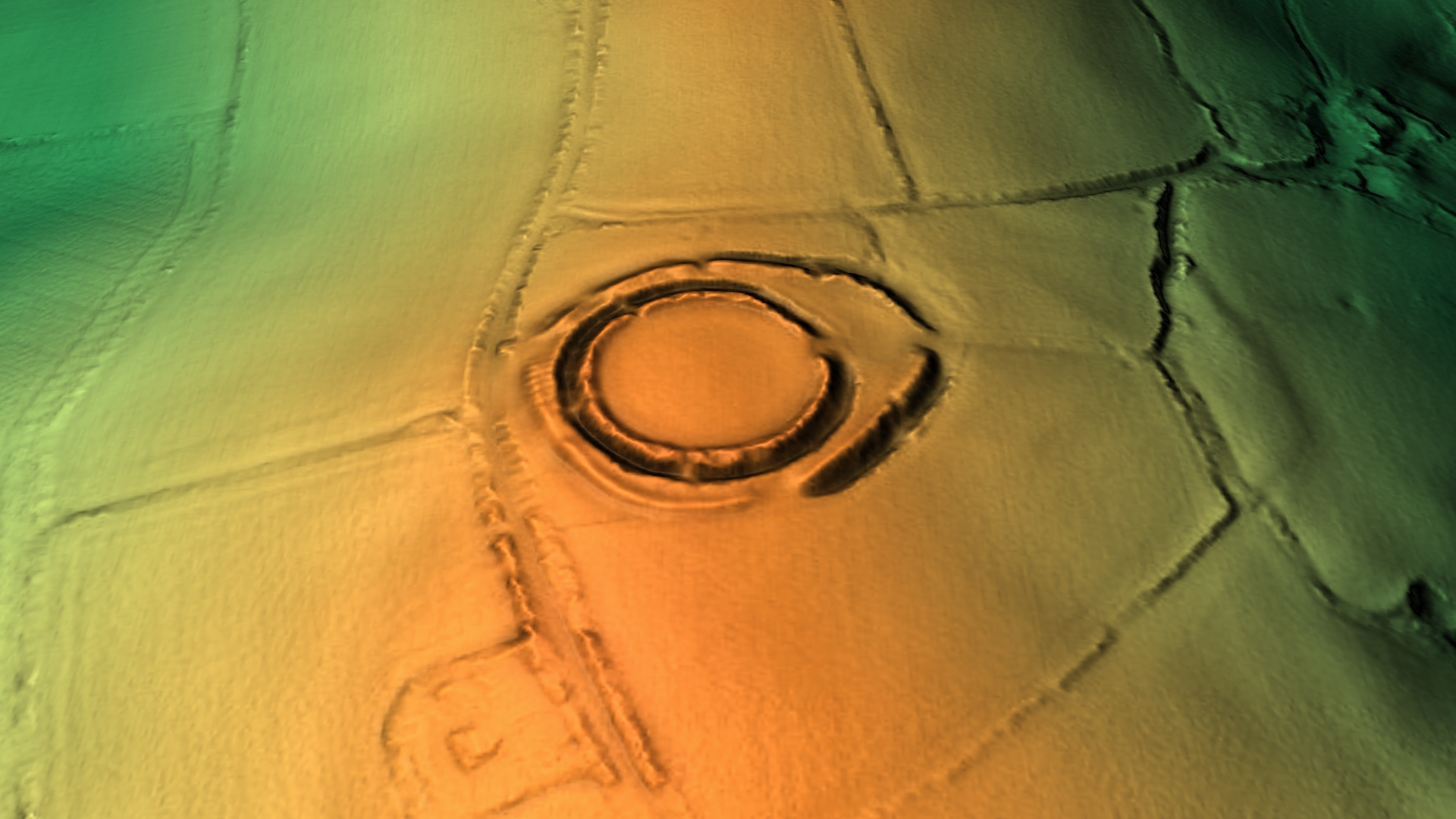
3D view of the digital terrain model

The perimeter of Castle Dore consists of two ditches (bivallate). The inner ditch is circular, measuring 79 metres (259 ft) in diameter internally, and the outer ditch arced round it from the north to the south-east before widening in the north east to form an entrance. The ramparts (earth banks just inside the ditch) were raised later in the fort's history – from 1.8 to 2.5 metres (5 ft 11 in to 8 ft 2 in) – the layout remained mostly the same aside from the entrance which was made more complex.

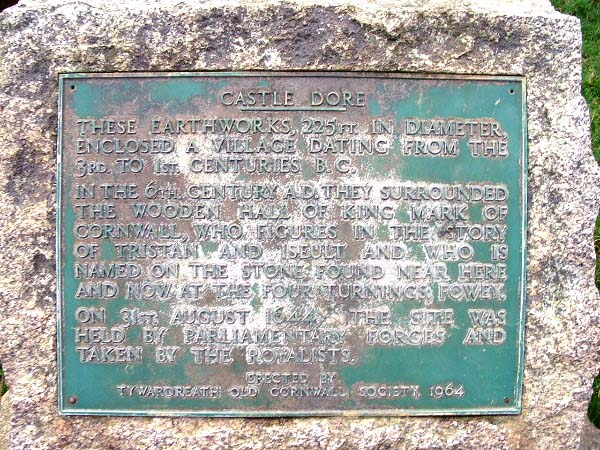
A plaque at Castle Dore, summarising the old interpretation of the site

Archaeologist Ralegh Radford led excavations at Castle Dore in 1936 and '37. Five decades later, the work still represented the most intensive investigation of a hillfort in Cornwall. At the time of Radford's work, archaeologists tended to concentrate on the defences in the course of examining hillforts; Radford, however, investigated the interior and found postholes belonging to huts of at least two distinct phases of occupation.

Radford's initial interpretation was that the fort had been reoccupied in the 5th and 6th centuries AD; however, later reinterpretation based on a greater understanding of post-Roman archaeology concluded that the occupation at Castle Dore was restricted to the Iron Age. The use of radiocarbon dating at other sites lead to greater understanding of the contexts within which Iron Age pottery was found. The dating of the first phase of activity at Castle Dore was revised from the 2nd century BC to the 5th or 4th centuries BC.

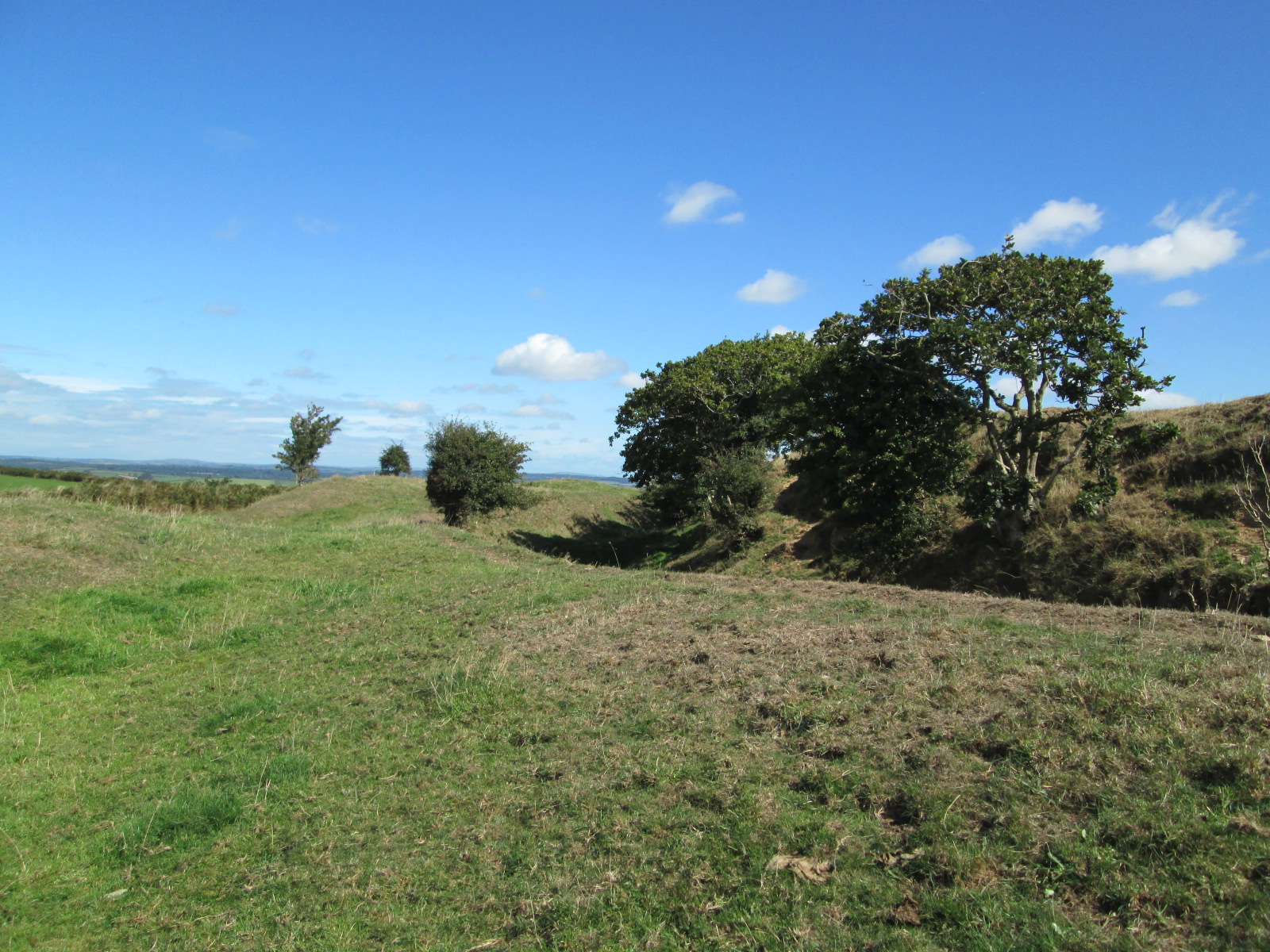
Viewed from the west

During the English Civil War, the final defeat of Essex's army was witnessed at the site. On 31 August 1644, whilst attempting a retreat from Lostwithiel to Fowey, Essex was forced to draw up his baggage train and remaining guns within the fort. Just before nightfall one regiment disbanded in disorder signalling impending surrender or death. By morning it was clear that his demoralised soldiers could not be trusted and Essex chose to flee.

== Legend ==
In tradition Castle Dore is the seat of the legendary Dark Age King Mark and is featured as such in the 2006 film Tristan & Isolde. This association derives from an inscribed 6th century granite pillar found near the Castle and known as the Tristan Stone. (This pillar was removed and re-erected about 2 miles away.)

== See also ==
- Castle Dor, a 1942 historical novel by Daphne du Maurier (1961)
- Castle an Dinas, St. Columb Major
- Prideaux Castle
