= Mabel Quiller-Couch =

English editor and compiler

Florence Mabel Quiller-Couch (17 June 1865 – November 1924) was an English editor, compiler and children's writer.

== Biography ==
Mabel Quiller-Couch was born in Bodmin, Cornwall to physician Thomas Quiller-Couch and his wife, Mary (née Ford). She was the second child and eldest daughter of five children. Her elder brother was the critic Arthur Quiller-Couch. After a disappointment in love, she lived with her younger sister Lilian Mary, also a writer, in Hampstead.

Of her 26 publications, one was jointly written and one jointly edited with her sister. Quiller-Couch was the author of a number of novels and the compiler of an anthology of writings about the University of Oxford up to 1850.

== Selected works ==
- (With Lilian Quiller-Couch) Ancient and Holy Wells of Cornwall. London: Chas. J. Clark, 1894 (Based on a manuscript work by Thomas Quiller-Couch; reissued: Liskeard, Cornwall: Tamara, 1994)
- One Good Seed Sown: or, Old Jasper's Protege 1 vol. London: Sunday School Union, 1896.
- Kitty Trenire. London: Thomas Nelson, 1909 (Juvenile novel; Reissued: Hertford: Cityscape, 2001)
- A Book of Children's Verse; arranged by Mabel and Lilian Quiller-Couch; illus. by M. Etheldreda Gray. London: Henry Frowde; Hodder & Stoughton, 1911
  - (Edited with Lilian Quiller-Couch) The Treasure Book of Children's Verse. New York, G. H. Doran, 1911 (there are also later reissues of both the British and American editions)
- Cornwall's Wonderland. London: J. M. Dent, 1914 (Contents: How Corineus fought the chief of the giants.--The giant of St. Michael's Mount.--The legend of the Tamar, the Tavy, and the Taw.--The strange story of Cherry Honey.--The fairies on the Gump.--The fairy ointment.--The exciting adventure of John Sturtridge.--The true story of Anne and the fairies.--Barker and the Buccas.--Lutey and the mermaid.--The wicked spectre.--The story of the lovers' cove.--The silver table.--Cruel Coppinger, the Dane.--Madge Figgy, the wrecker.--How Madge Figgy got her pig.--The story of Sir Tristram and La Belle Isoult.)
- A Cottage Rose, 1920
