= Arthur Quiller-Couch =

British writer and literary critic (1863–1944)

Sir Arthur Quiller-Couch
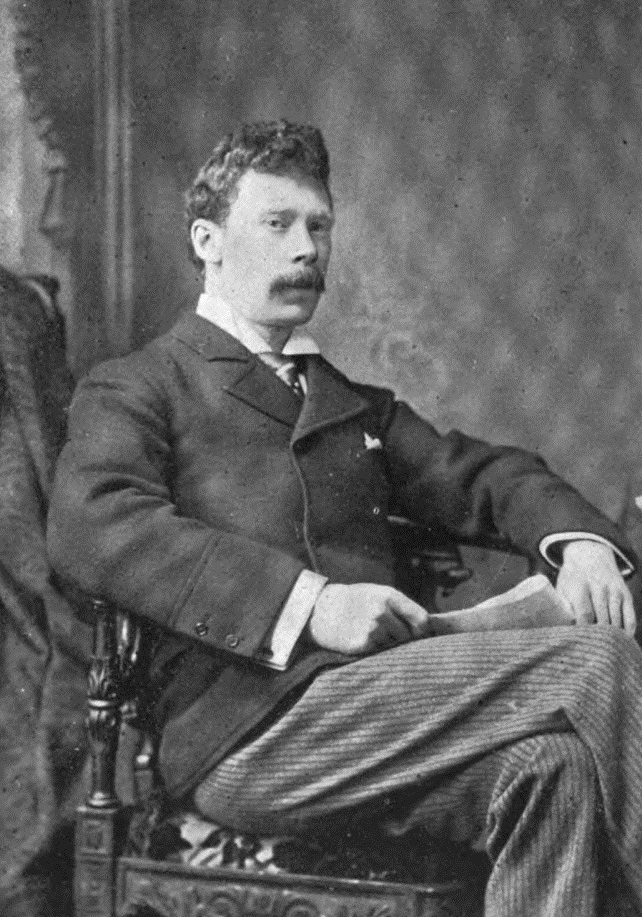
- Born: Arthur Thomas Quiller Couch; 21 November 1863; Bodmin, Cornwall
- Died: 12 May 1944 (aged 80); Cornwall, England
- Education: Newton Abbot Proprietary College; Clifton College; Trinity College, Oxford
- Occupations: Poet; novelist; critic
- Writing career
- Pen name: Q
- Language: English
- Notable work: The Oxford Book of English Verse
- Notable awards: Knight Bachelor (1910); Bard of Gorseth Kernow (1928)

Sir Arthur Thomas Quiller-Couch (/ˌkwɪlərˈkuːtʃ/; 21 November 1863 – 12 May 1944) was a British writer and literary critic who published using the pseudonym Q. Although a prolific novelist, he is remembered mainly for the monumental publication The Oxford Book of English Verse 1250–1900 (later extended to 1918) and for his literary criticism. He influenced many who never met him, including American writer Helene Hanff, author of 84, Charing Cross Road and its sequel, Q's Legacy.

== Early life ==
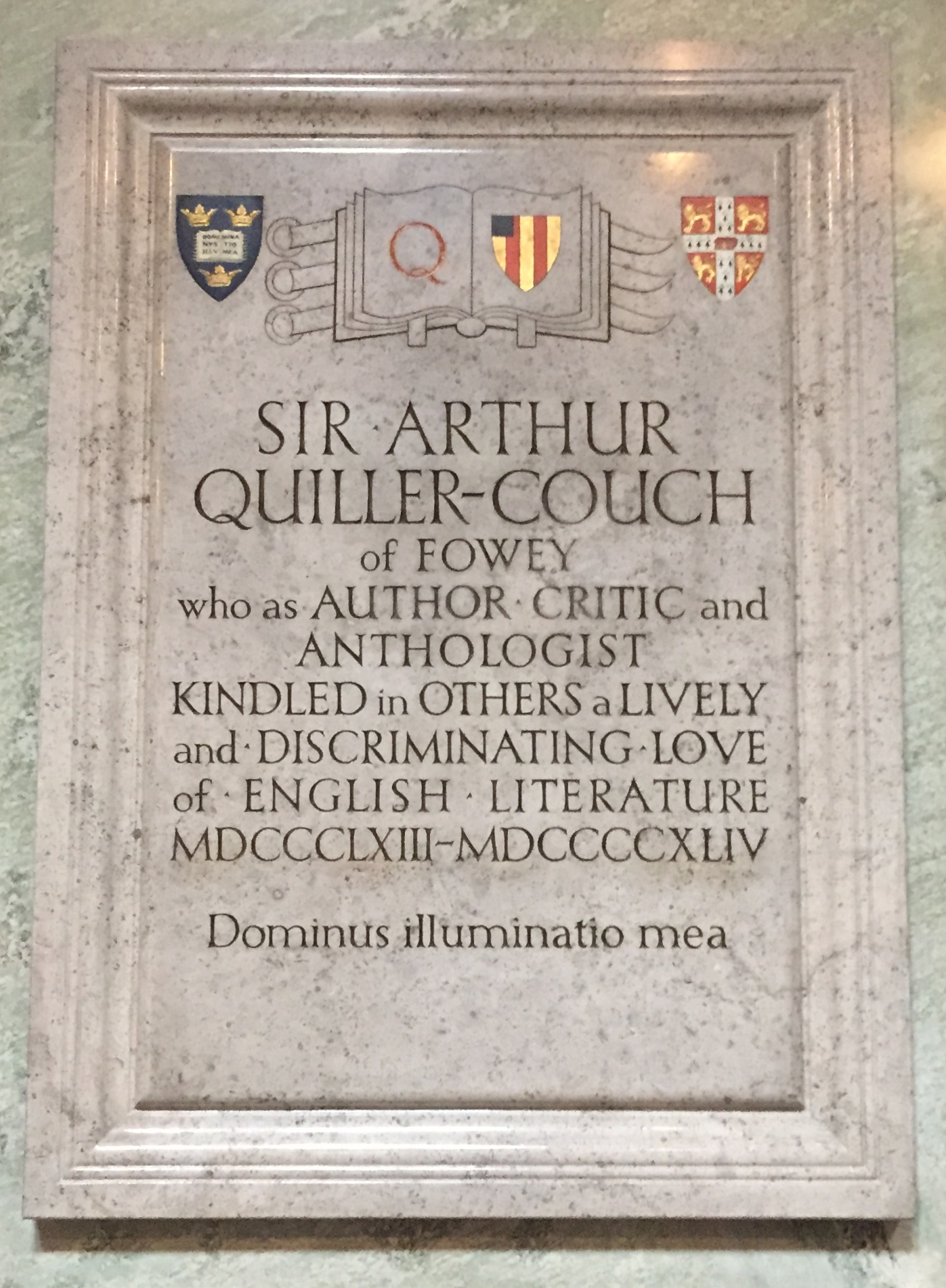
Memorial in Truro Cathedral

Arthur Quiller-Couch was born in the town of Bodmin, Cornwall. He was the son of Dr Thomas Quiller Couch (d. 1884), who was a noted physician, folklorist and historian who married Mary Ford and lived at 63, Fore Street, Bodmin, until his death in 1884. Thomas was the product of the union of two ancient local families, the Quiller family and the Couch family. Arthur was the third in a line of intellectuals from the Couch family. His grandfather, Jonathan Couch, was a naturalist, physician, historian, classicist, apothecary, and illustrator (particularly of fish). His younger sisters Florence Mabel and Lilian M. were also writers and folklorists.

Arthur Quiller-Couch had two children. His son, Bevil Brian Quiller-Couch, was a war hero and poet, whose romantic letters to his fiancée, the poet May Wedderburn Cannan, were published in Tears of War. Kenneth Grahame inscribed a first edition of his The Wind in the Willows to Arthur's daughter, Foy Felicia, attributing Quiller-Couch as the inspiration for the character Ratty.

Quiller-Couch was educated at Newton Abbot Proprietary College between the late 1870's and early 1880's. Thereafter, he also attended Clifton College, and Trinity College, Oxford, where he took a First in Classical Moderations (1884) and a Second in Greats (1886). From 1886, Quiller-Couch worked for a brief time as a Classics lecturer at Trinity. Thereafter, having gained some journalistic experience in London, mainly as a contributor to The Speaker, he resettled at Fowey in Cornwall during 1891.

In Cornwall he was an active political worker for the Liberal Party. He was knighted in 1910, and in 1928 was made a Bard of the Cornish cultural society Gorseth Kernow, adopting the Bardic name Marghak Cough ('Red Knight'). He was Commodore of the Royal Fowey Yacht Club from 1911 until his death. He was president of the Village Drama Society which was based at Kelly House in Devon.

Quiller-Couch died at home in May 1944 aged 80, after being injured by a jeep near his home in Cornwall in the preceding March during his daily walk to the Royal Fowey Yacht Club.

== World War I ==
On 27 March 1915, Quiller-Couch and Colonel Dudley Acland Mills (a retired officer) formed the Duke of Cornwall's Light Infantry 10th Battalion; on 24 October 1915, the Battalion was taken over by the War Office, which allowed Quiller-Couch to return to his academic post at Cambridge.

His son Bevil died of Spanish flu in 1919.

== Literary and academic career ==
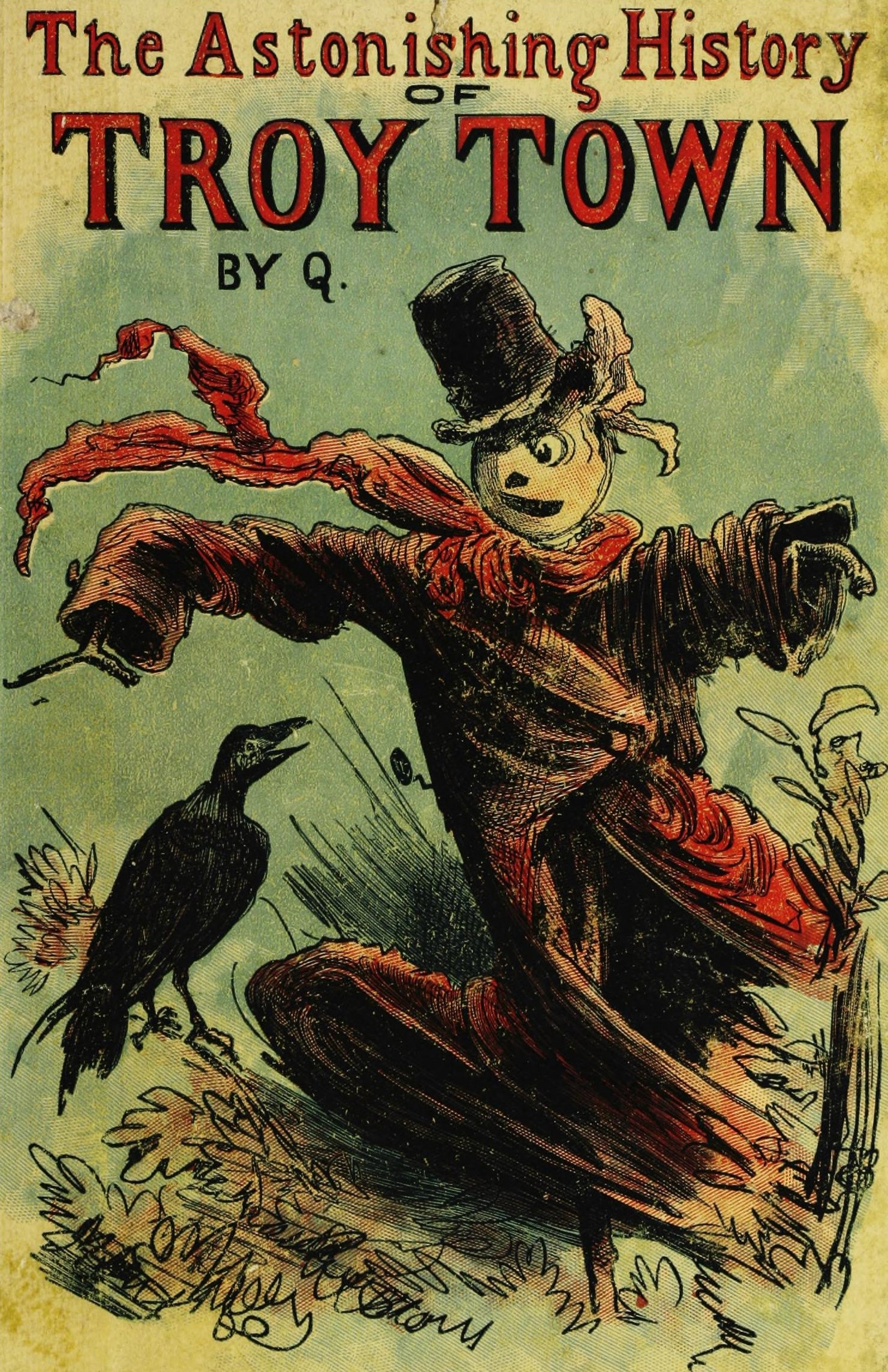
The Astonishing History of Troy Town

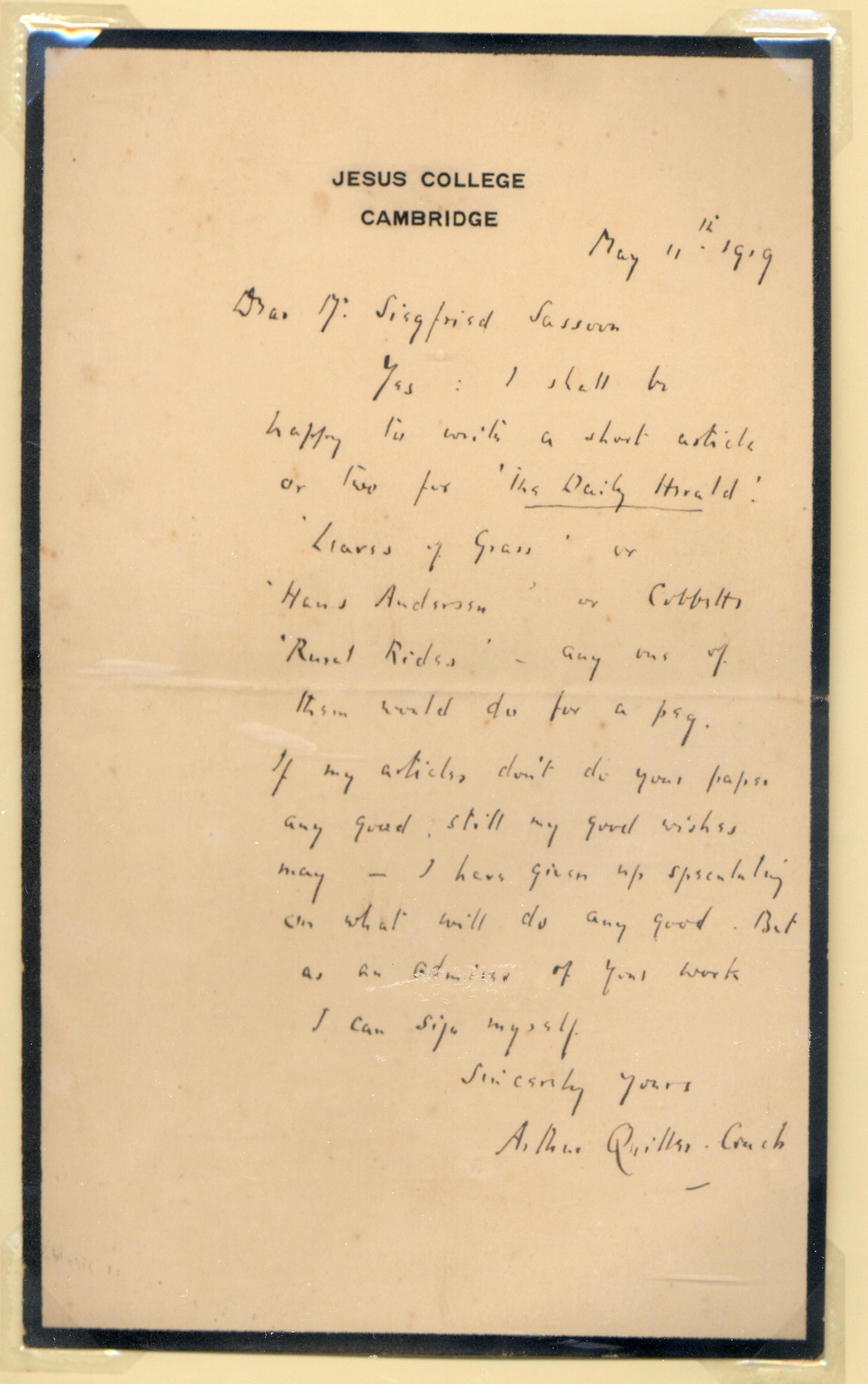
A handwritten letter from Quiller-Couch to Siegfried Sassoon, about the possibility of Quiller-Couch writing for The Daily Herald

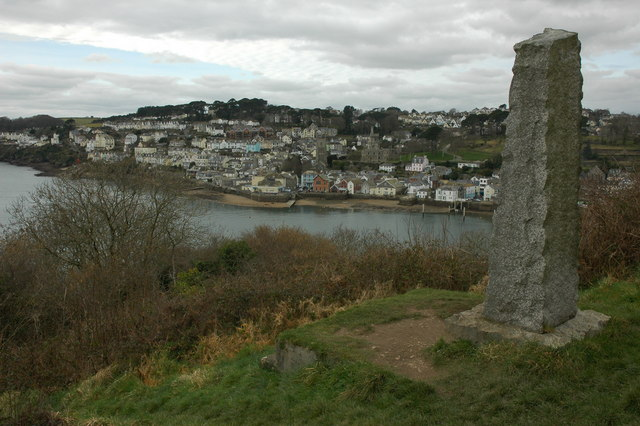
Sir Arthur T. Quiller-Couch Monument, Fowey

In 1887, while he was attending Oxford, he published Dead Man's Rock, a romance in the style of Robert Louis Stevenson's Treasure Island, and later The Astonishing History of Troy Town (1888), a comic novel set in a fictionalised version of his home town of Fowey, and The Splendid Spur (1889). Quiller-Couch was well known for his story "The Rollcall of the Reef", based on the wreck of HMS Primrose during 1809 on the Cornish coast. He published during 1896 a series of critical articles, Adventures in Criticism, and in 1898 he published a completion of Robert Louis Stevenson's unfinished novel, St. Ives.

From his Oxford time he was known as a writer of excellent verse. With the exception of the parodies entitled Green Bays (1893), his poetical work is contained in Poems and Ballads (1896). In 1895 he published an anthology from the 16th- and 17th-century English lyricists, The Golden Pomp, followed in 1900 by the Oxford Book of English Verse, 1250–1900. Later editions of this extended the period of concern to 1918 and it remained the leading general anthology of English verse until Helen Gardner's New Oxford Book of English Verse appeared in 1972.

In 1910 he published The Sleeping Beauty and other Fairy Tales from the Old French. He was the author of a number of popular novels with Cornish settings (collected edition as 'Tales and Romances', 30 vols. 1928–29).

He was appointed King Edward VII Professor of English Literature in the University of Cambridge in 1912 and retained the chair for the rest of his life. Simultaneously, he was elected to a Fellowship of Jesus College, which he also held until his death. His inaugural lectures as professor of English literature were published as the book On the Art of Writing. His rooms were on staircase C, First Court, and known as the 'Q-bicle'. He supervised the beginnings of the English Faculty there — an academic diplomat in a fractious community. He is sometimes regarded as the epitome of the school of English literary criticism later modified by his pupil F. R. Leavis.

Alistair Cooke was a student of Quiller-Couch and Nick Clarke's semi-official biography of Cooke features Quiller-Couch prominently, noting that he was regarded by the Cambridge establishment as "rather eccentric" even by the university's standards.

Quiller-Couch was a noted literary critic, publishing editions of some of Shakespeare's plays (in the New Shakespeare, published by Cambridge University Press, with Dover Wilson) and several critical works, including Studies in Literature (1918) and On the Art of Reading (1920). He edited a companion to his verse anthology: The Oxford Book of English Prose, which was published in 1923. He left his autobiography, Memories and Opinions, unfinished; it was nevertheless published in 1945.

== Legacy ==
His Book of English Verse is often quoted by John Mortimer's fictional character Horace Rumpole.

Castle Dor, a re-telling of the Tristan and Iseult myth in modern circumstances, was left unfinished at Quiller-Couch's death and was completed many years later by Daphne du Maurier. As she wrote in the Sunday Telegraph in April 1962, she began the job with considerable trepidation, at the request of Quiller-Couch's daughter and "in memory of happy evenings long ago when 'Q' was host at Sunday supper".

He features as a main character, played by Leo McKern, in the 1992 BBC television feature The Last Romantics. The story focuses on his relationship with his protégé, F. R. Leavis, and the students.

His Cambridge inaugural lecture series, published as On the Art of Writing, is the source of the popular writers' adage "murder your darlings":

If you here require a practical rule of me, I will present you with this: 'Whenever you feel an impulse to perpetrate a piece of exceptionally fine writing, obey it—whole-heartedly—and delete it before sending your manuscript to press. Murder your darlings.'

Quiller-Couch may have adapted the phrase from his acquaintance George Meredith's 1859 novel The Ordeal of Richard Feverel, which he is known to have read. The novel contains the line "Killing one's darling child is a painful imposition", describing a boy being forced to burn a manuscript of his poetry by his controlling father.

== Works ==
=== Fiction ===
- Dead Man's Rock (1887)
- The Astonishing History of Troy Town (1888)
- The Splendid Spur (1889)
- The Blue Pavilions (1891)
- I Saw Three Ships and Other Winter's Tales (1892)
- The Delectable Duchy: Stories, Studies and Sketches (1893)
- Wandering Heath: Stories, Studies, and Sketches (1895)
- Ia, A Love Story (1896)
- St Ives (1898), completing an unfinished novel by Robert Louis Stevenson.
- Noughts and Crosses: Stories, Studies and Sketches (1898)
- The Ship of Stars (1899)
- A Fowey Garland (1899)
- Old Fires and Profitable Ghosts (1900)
- The Laird's Luck and Other Fireside Tales (1901)
- The Westcotes (1902)
- The White Wolf and Other Fireside Tales (1902)
- Hetty Wesley (1903) (This was based on the life of the poet Mehetabel Wesley Wright.)
- The Adventures of Harry Revel (1903)
- Fort Amity (1904)
- The Shining Ferry (1905)
- Shakespeare's Christmas and Other Stories (1905)
- The Mayor of Troy (1906)
- Sir John Constantine (1906)
- Merry Garden and Other Stories (1907)
- Poison Island (1907)
- Major Vigoureux (1907)
- True Tilda (1909)
- Corporal Sam and Other Stories (1910)
- Lady Good-for-Nothing: A Man's Portrait of a Woman (1910)
- Brother Copas (1911)
- Hocken and Hunken: A Tale of Troy (1912)
- My Best Book (1912)
- News from the Duchy (1913)
- Nicky-Nan, Reservist (1915)
- Mortallone and Aunt Trinidad: Tales of the Spanish Main (1917)
- Foe-Farrell: A Romance (1918)
- Castle Dor (1962) This novel was left unfinished at his death, and completed by Daphne Du Maurier.

A collected edition of Q's fiction appeared as Tales and Romances (30 volumes, 1928–29).

=== Verse ===
- Green Bays, Verses and Parodies (1893)
- Poems and Ballads (1896)
- The Vigil of Venus and Other Poems (1912)

=== Criticism and anthologies ===
- The Golden Pomp, a procession of English lyrics from Surrey to Shirley (1895)
- Adventures in Criticism (1896; 2nd edition, 1924)
- Oxford Book of English Verse, 1250–1900 (1900)
- From a Cornish Window (1906)
- English Sonnets (Published in 1897, reprinted in 1910)
- The Sleeping Beauty and other Fairy Tales from the Old French (1910)
- The Oxford Book of Ballads (1911)
- In Powder and Crinoline: Old Fairy Tales Retold (1913)
- On the Art of Writing (1916)
- Notes on Shakespeare's Workmanship (1917)
- Studies in Literature: First Series (1918)
- Shakespeare's Workmanship (1918)
- On the Art of Reading (1920)
- The Oxford Book of Victorian Verse (1922)
- Studies in Literature: Second Series (1922)
- Oxford Book of English Prose (1923)
- Studies in Literature: Third Series (1929)
- The Poet As Citizen and Other papers (Macmillan, 1935)
- Cambridge Lectures (1943; 2nd ed. 1944)

=== Autobiography ===
- Memories and Opinions (unfinished, published 1945)

== Sources ==
- Brittain, Frederick, Arthur Quiller-Couch, a Biographical Study of Q (Cambridge: University Press, 1947)
- Quiller-Couch, A. T., Memories and Opinions (Unfinished; it was nevertheless published in 1945 though only the years up to 1887 are covered.)
- Rowse, A. L., Quiller-Couch: a Portrait of "Q" (1988)
