= Gwen Lally =

English actor and pageant master

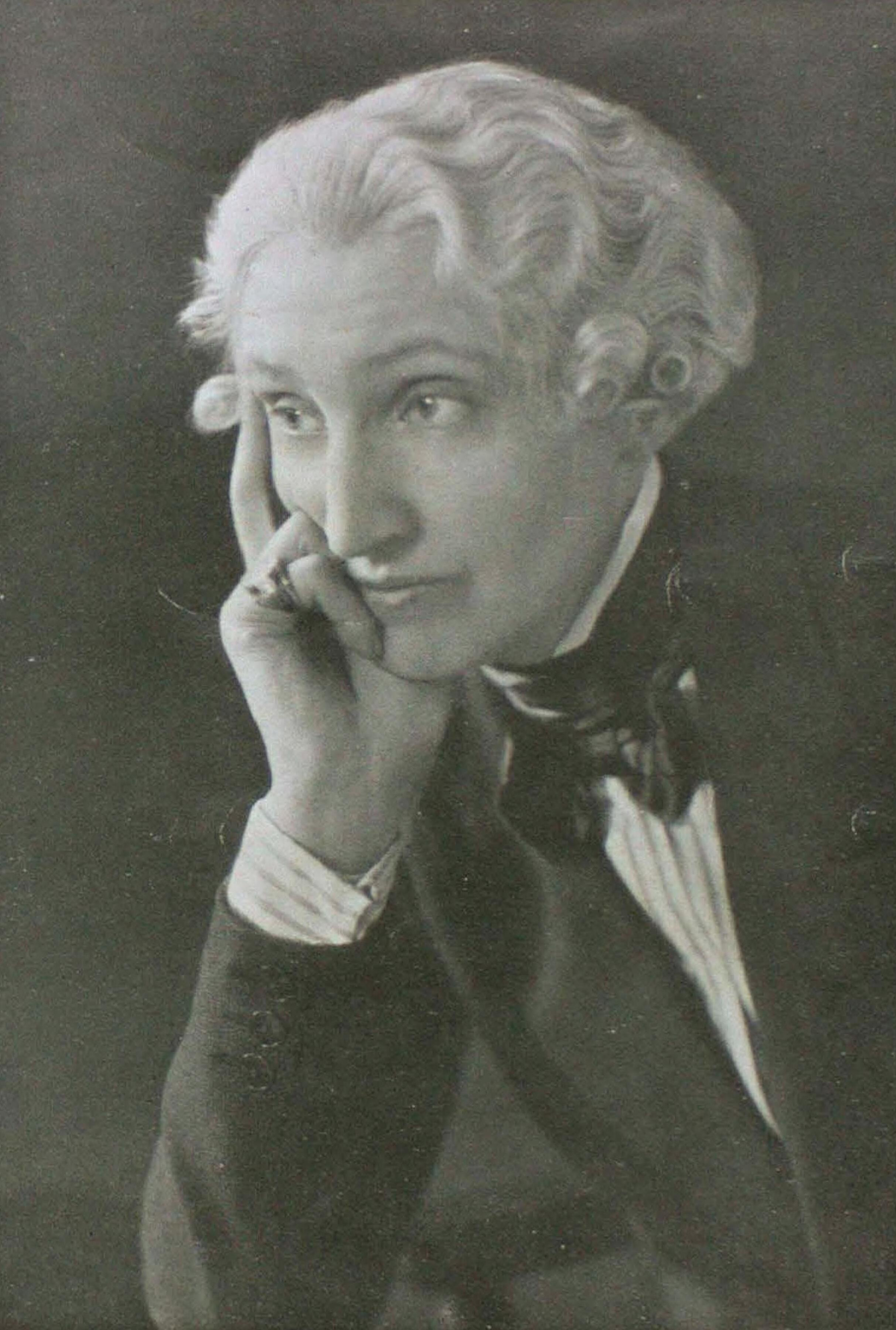
- Gwen Lally
- Born: March 1, 1882; Fulham, London
- Died: April 14, 1963 (aged 81); Tunbridge Wells, Kent
- Occupations: Actor and pageant master

Gwen Lally OBE (born Gwendolin Rosalie Lally Tollandal Speck, 1 March 1882 – 14 April 1963) was an English pageant master, actor, theatre producer, playwright and lecturer. Lally regularly defied gender conventions and often chose to wear 'masculine' clothing that was typical of the era, such as trousers and a top hat. As the first woman pageant maker she produced many historical pageants for smaller towns and organisations as well as major city pageants which involved casts of thousands.

== Early life ==
Lally was born at 20 Perham Road, Fulham, London, to 'gentleman' Jocelyn Henry Speck and Rosalie Hughes Dalrymple. She was the eldest of three children. As a child she had a passion for Shakespeare and acting, and became an actress despite parental opposition.

She grew up on the Oxfordshire/Warwickshire border where her father, who had taken holy orders, was curate at Banbury (1887-1890) and vicar of Wroxton (1892-1907). There, she frequently contributed to church and village entertainments. In 1901, she performed as Olivia in Twelfth Night along with Frank Stevens (later pageant master Frank Lascelles) at a fete in Banbury in aid of Banbury National Schools. In 1907 she acted in the Oxford Historical Pageant, directed by Frank Lascelles.

== Career ==
In 1906, Lally began her career at His Majesty’s Theatre, London, under the management of Sir Herbert Beerbohm Tree. She also worked in touring theatre and music halls, and at the Old Vic. Lally only ever appeared on stage as a female once, in Dinner Together in 1914, and even then her character was a ‘male impersonator'. She claimed "the distinction of being the only actress who has never worn skirts on the stage". However, in 1907 she appeared in the Oxford Historical Pageant in the role of Queen Eleanor.

As a director and producer she worked at repertory theatres in Leeds, where she had her own repertory company at the Little Theatre, and Westcliff on Sea. She encouraged town and village drama movements, lecturing on drama and critiquing student productions at Village Drama Society schools. In 1926 she directed the Village Drama Society's summer school in Bath and in York in 1927. She was also an adjudicator at the Yorkshire Women's Institute Drama Competitions. In 1924 she produced a performance of Shakespeare's Henry VIII with an all woman cast of about 100 members of the Westerham, Brasted and Crookham Hill Women's Institutes in Kent.

Lally wrote two plays, acting in both of them: Pierrot Philanders (1917) and The Great Moment (1918).

Lally is best known as a pageant maker, and the first woman to succeed in this work. Other well known pageant masters were Louis N. Parker and Frank Lascelles. The pageant master was responsible for the production and coordination of casts of performers and musicians who were often volunteers. Lally produced many pageants including:

- Pageant of Kent, Lullingstone Castle, Kent (1924)
- Shere Pageant, Surrey (1925)
- Women's Institute village pageant, Rillington, near Malton, North Yorkshire (1927)
- Westcroft Park, Woking, Surrey (1928)
- Pageant of Ashdown Forest, Kent (1929). A.A. Milne wrote the finale and his son Christopher Robin was a child performer.
- The Spirit of Warwickshire, Warwick Castle (1930)
- Tewkesbury Pageant (1931)
- Battle Abbey Pageant, Sussex (1932)
- Runnymede Pageant (1934), which featured future Air Transport Auxiliary pilot Veronica Volkersz
- Pageant of England, Langley Park, Bucks. (1935)
- Pageant of Birmingham: the centenary of the granting of the City of Birmingham's Charter of Incorporation in which 8000 people took part (1938)
- Pageant of Dudley (1951)
- Malvern Pageant, Worcestershire (1951)
- Pageant of Poole, Dorset (1952): involved 1500 performers

Gwen Lally was known for "her powerful personality and striking figure". In her opinion, pageant making brought together people of all classes and types and promoted friendships between enemies. As a pioneer in the field of pageant making she was appointed an Officer of the Order of the British Empire in the 1954 New Year Honours. She died on 14 April 1963 in Tunbridge Wells, Kent.

Egham Museum in Surrey holds some of the Runnymeade Pageant costumes in their collections.
