= Castle an Dinas, St Columb Major =

Iron Age hillfort in Cornwall, England

Castle an Dinas
- Kastel an Dinas (Cornish)
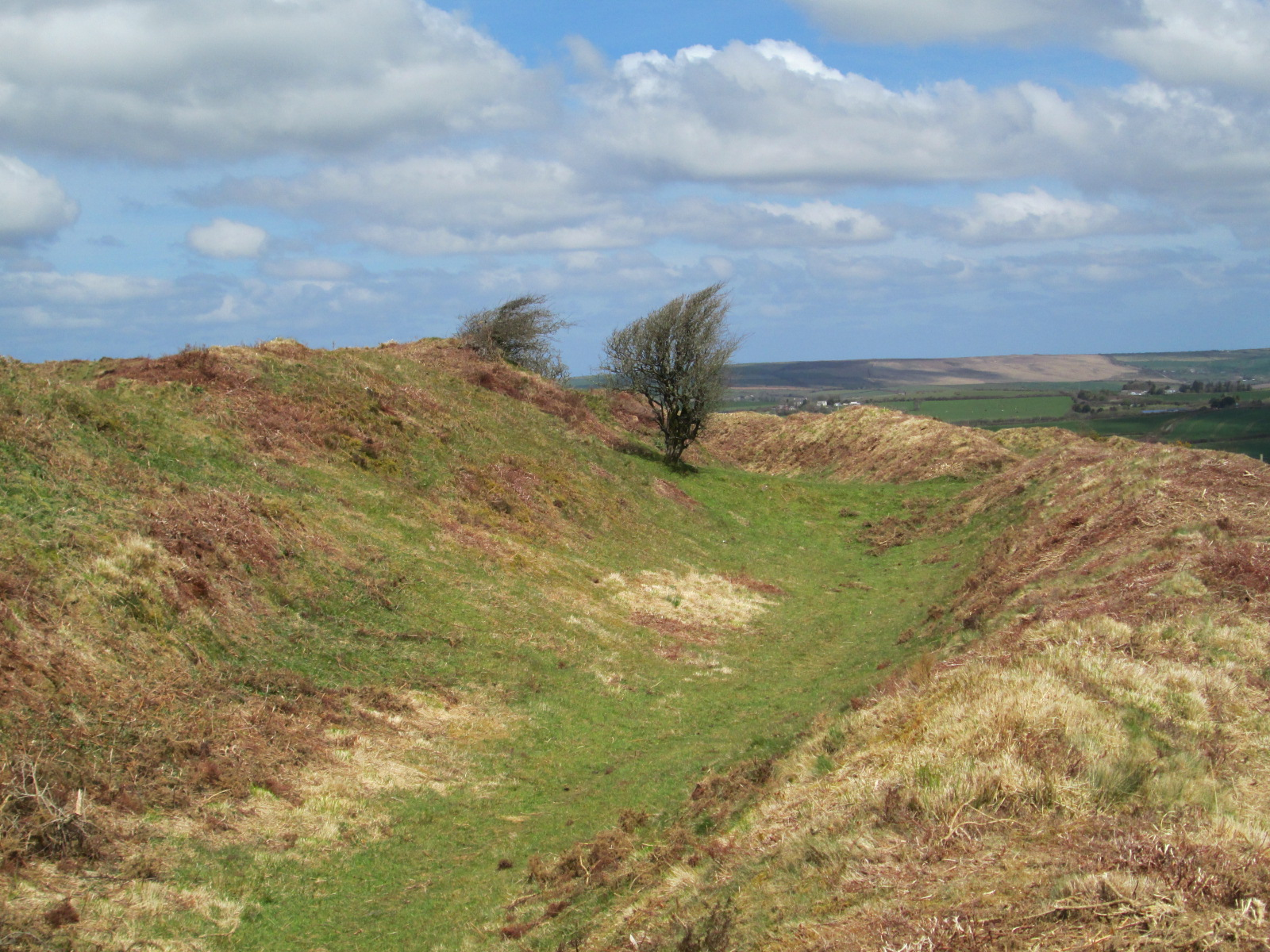
- Defensive ramparts of Castle an Dinas
- Interactive map of Castle an Dinas
- 50.42541°N 4.89453°W
- OS grid reference: SW945624

Site notes
- Elevation: 216 meters (709 ft)

Scheduled monument
- Official name: Large multivallate hillfort with two bowl barrows known as Castle-an-Dinas, 335m north of Tresaddern Bungalow
- Designated: 26 November 1928
- Reference no.: 1006713

Castle an Dinas (Cornish: Kastel an Dinas, meaning castle of the hillfort) is an Iron Age hillfort at the summit of Castle Downs near St Columb Major in Cornwall, UK (grid reference SW945624) and is considered one of the most important hillforts in the southwest of Britain. It dates from around the 3rd to 2nd century BCE and consists of three ditch and rampart concentric rings, 708 feet (216 m) above sea level. During the early 1960s it was excavated by a team led by Dr Bernard Wailes of the University of Pennsylvania during two seasons of excavation.

== Arthurian legend ==
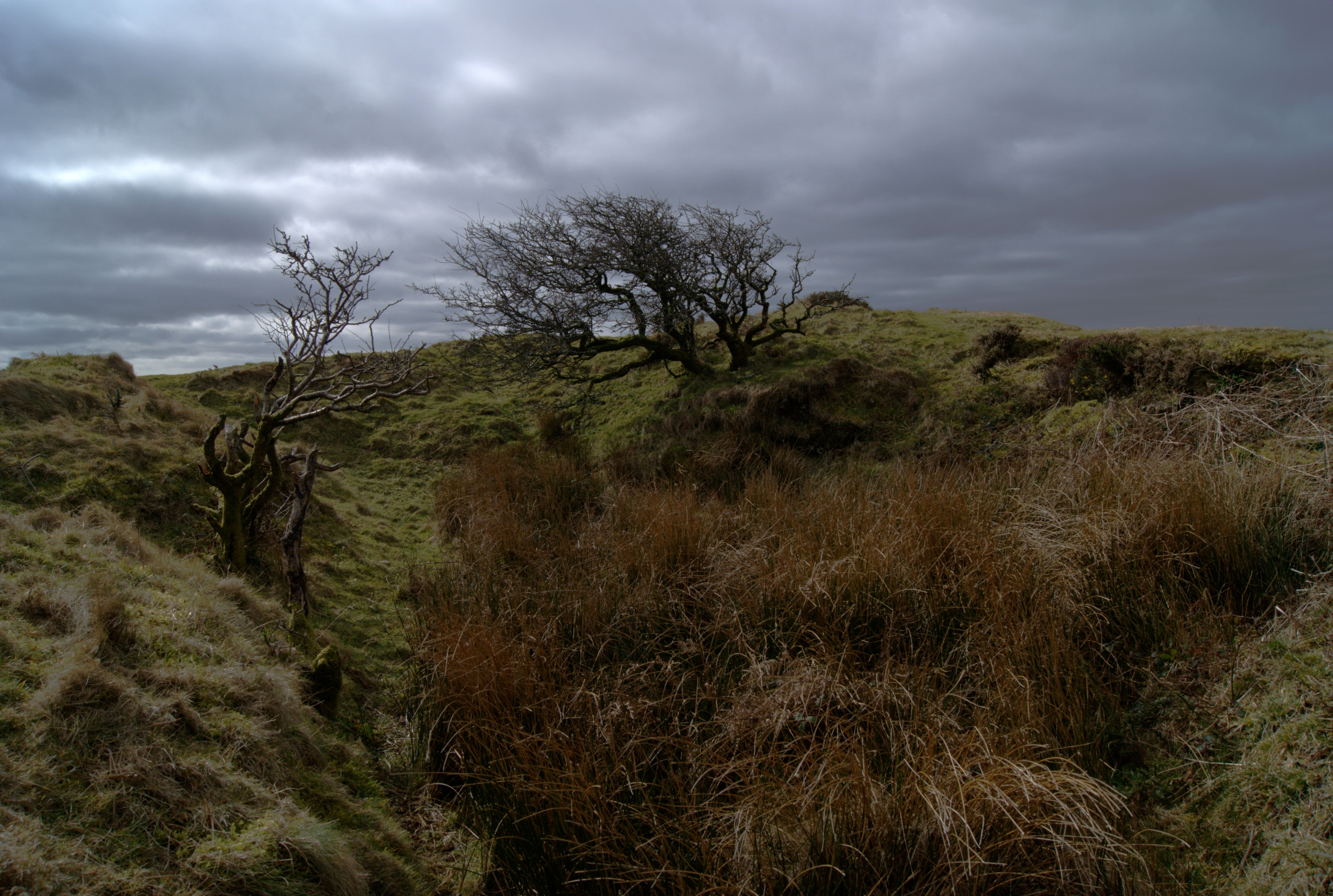
One of the two Bronze Age barrows at Castle an Dinas

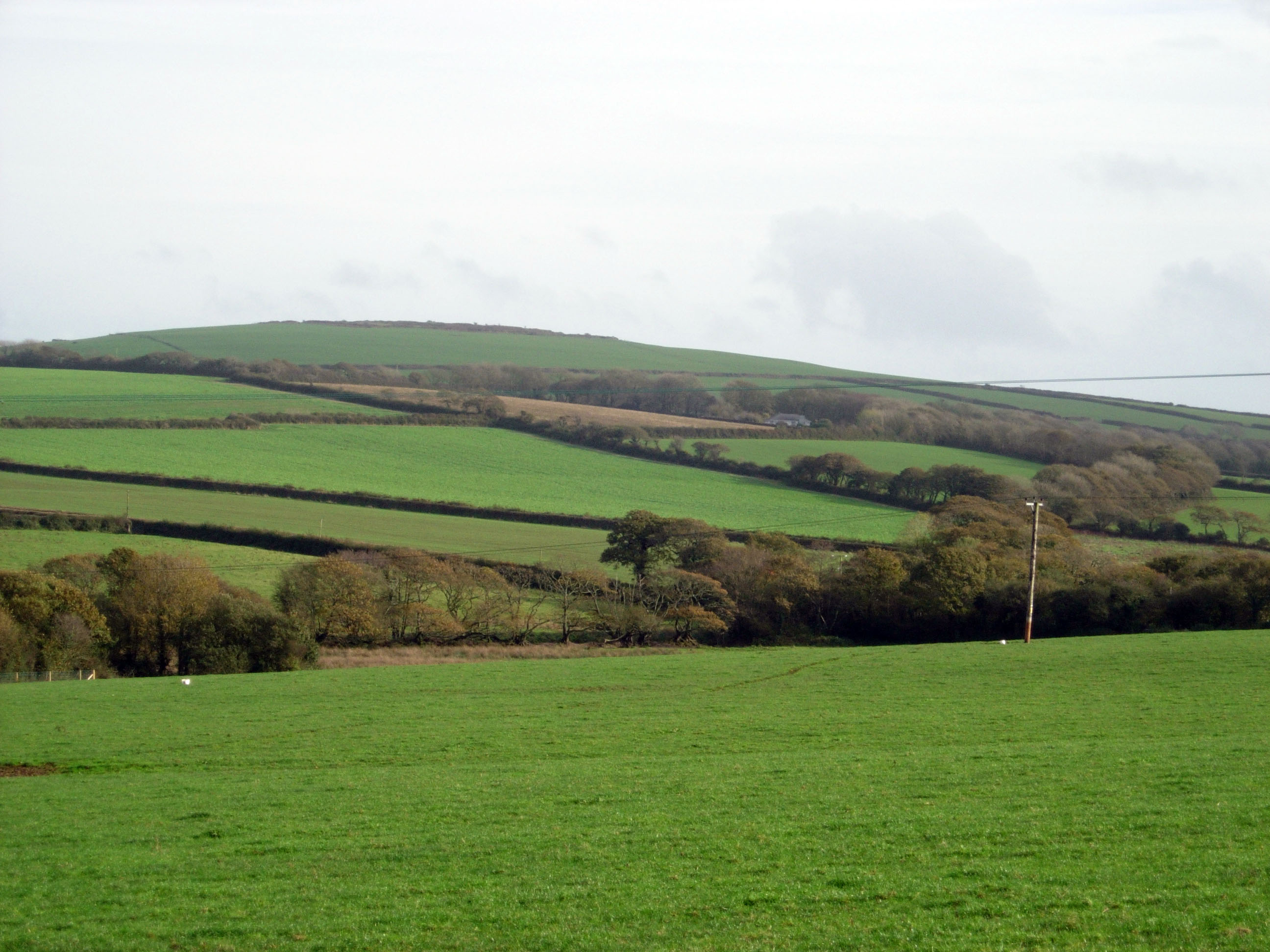
Castle an Dinas as viewed from St. Columb Major

Traditionally, Castle an Dinas is the hunting lodge (hunting seat) of King Arthur, from which he rode in the Tregoss Moor hunt. A stone near St Columb (now lost) allegedly bore the four footprints of his horse made whilst hunting.

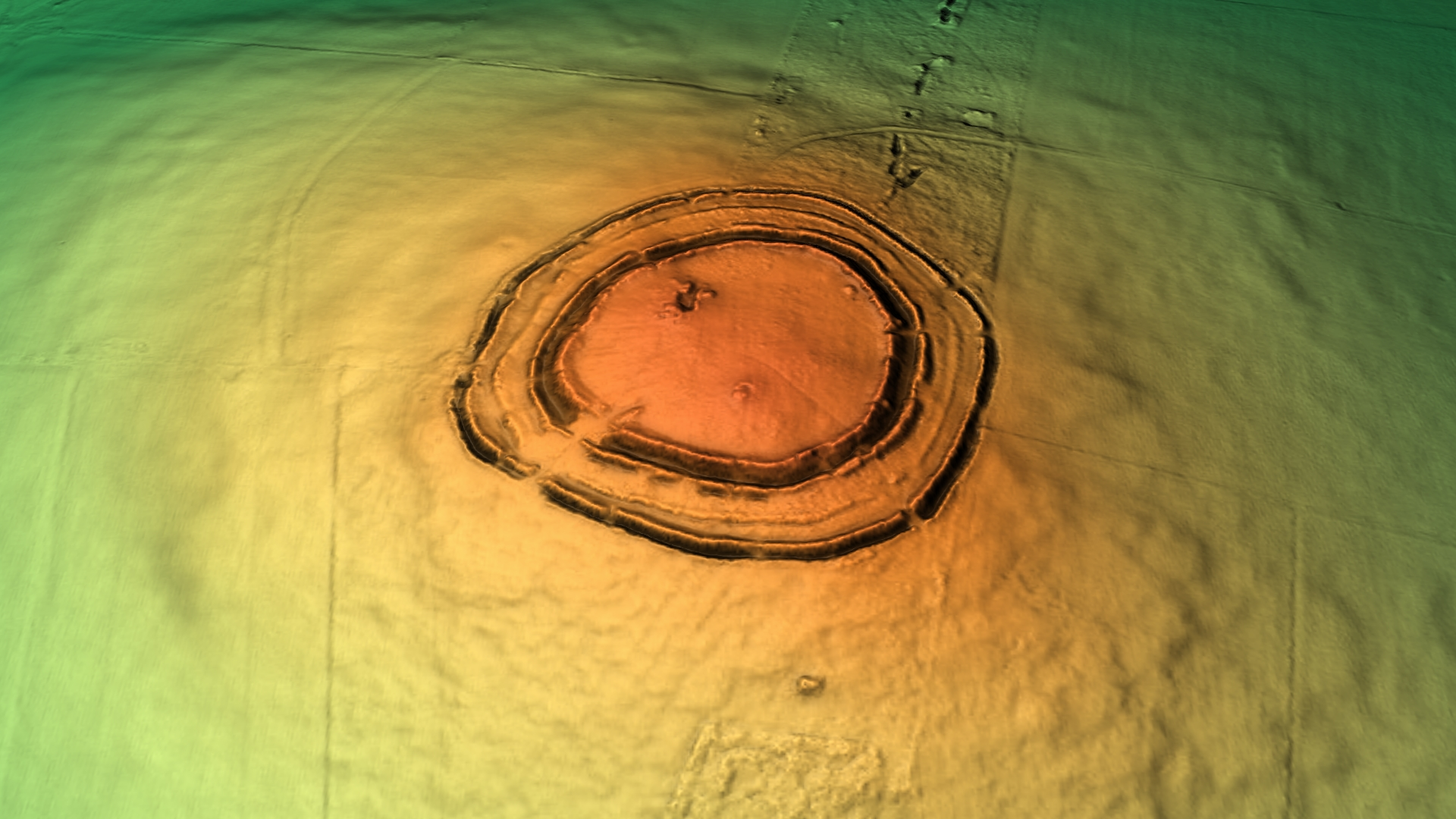
3D view of the digital terrain model

The earliest written history was written by William of Worcester during his visit to Cornwall in 1478, who described it as ruined, and said "it lies on a high hill and a spring rises in the midst of the castle". He also recorded a legend associated with it, that "Tador Duke of Cornwall, husband of the mother of Arthur was slain" at Castle an Dinas. This is generally interpreted as a conflation of Cador and Gorlois (Igraine's husband, who dies at Dimilioc in the Historia Regum Britanniae), but may reflect a local tradition instead, since the Historia is the only authority that specifies Igraine's husband as Gorlois.

The 1504 Cornish play Beunans Meriasek ('The Life of Saint Meriasek') also describes Castle an Dinas as a dwelling place of the Duke of Cornwall, who defeated King Teudar. As a result, it has been seen as a centre of royal power in Cornish lore.

== Civil War ==
In March 1646, during the English Civil War, Sir Ralph Hopton's Royalist troops camped for two nights within the rings of the fort. Here they held a Council of War where it was decided that they would surrender to the Parliamentarians. Only Hopton and Major-General Webb voted against. A few days later Hopton surrendered at Tresillian Bridge near Truro.

== Other notable occurrences ==
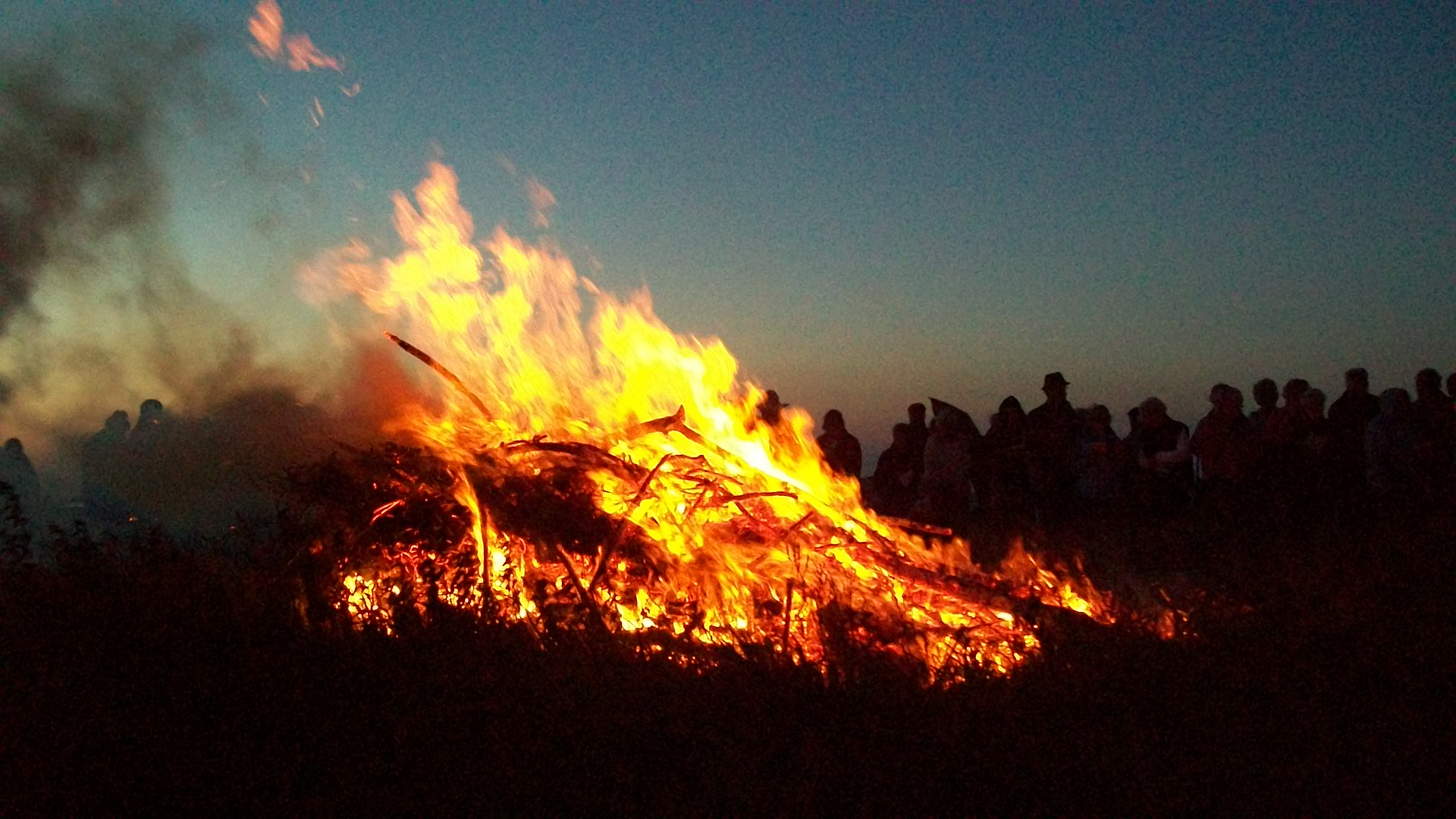
Tansys Golowan – Midsummer's eve bonfire held annually at Castle an Dinas.

Ghost army An extraordinary event that took place at the site was recorded by Cornish historian Samuel Drew, a ghost army was seen in the sky above Castle an Dinas around the end of the 18th century: (if true, a most unusual but documented form of mirage.)

In 1867, Henry Jenner heard a story from an old man at Quoit, near Castle an Dinas, who had seen the ghosts of King Arthur's soldiers drilling there, and remembered the glancing of the moonbeams on their muskets!

Murder In 1904 a young woman, by the name Jessie Rickard, was murdered on the site by a jealous lover, he then killed himself.

Midsummer The Old Cornwall Society hold their traditional annual midsummer bonfires here on the highest point of the fort. This ceremony dates back to pre-Christian times to when Pagans would mark the Summer Solstice

== The execution of John Trehenban ==
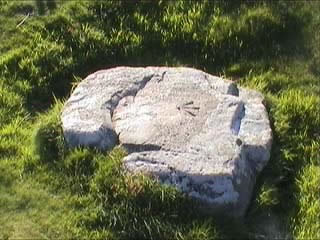
The stone at Castle an Dinas on which the cage stood and Trehenban starved

In 1671, a man called John Trehenban (pronounced TREM-on) (1650–1671) of St Columb Major, murdered two young girls and was sentenced to imprisonment in a cage on Castle an Dinas, and starved to death. The murder of the two young girls is recorded in the Parish Register.

23 June 1671 Anne daughter of John Pollard of this Parish and Loveday Rosevear (aged 17), daughter of Thomas Rosevear of St Enoder were barbarously murdered on the day before in the home of Captain Peter Pollard at the bridge by one John Trehenban the son of Humphrey and Cissily Trehenban of this Parish at about 11 O' clock in the forenoon upon a market day.

- Trehenban pretended to help in finding the murderer riding on horseback following the bloodhounds. His hat blew off and the dogs wouldn't leave it. Eventually he confessed.
- The lane where the bloodhounds picked up the scent is still known as 'Tremmons lane'.
- He was placed in a cage which sat on a large rock. This rock can still be seen and local people used to say that if you ran around this rock fifty times you would hear his chains rattle.
- Tremmon begged a passing woman for some food. All she had were a few tallow candles which he ate ravenously.
- According to local historian Marshel Arthur, local people used to refer to a no-gooder as 'a right Tremmon'.

== Castle-an-Dinas mine ==
From 1916 to 1957 it was the site of Cornwall's largest wolfram mine. Many of the old buildings and workings remain standing. The mine is the type locality for the mineral Russellite.

Other minerals found here include: Arsenopyrite, Cacoxenite, Löllingite, Phlogopite, Topaz Turquoise

== Cornish wrestling ==
Castle an Dinas hosted a Cornish wrestling tournament in 2023 where the heavyweight, featherweight, middleweight and ladies championships were decided.

== See also ==
- Castle Dore
- Prideaux Castle
