= John Trehenban =

Cornishman, condemned to be starved to death for the alleged murder of two girls

John Trehenban (pronounced TREM-on) (1650–1671), of St Columb Major in Cornwall, Kingdom of England, was a murderer sentenced to imprisonment in a cage on Castle An Dinas downs and starved to death.

The murder of the two young girls is recorded in the Parish Register.

23 June 1671 Anne daughter of John Pollard of this Parish and Loveday Rosevear (aged 17), daughter of Thomas Rosevear of St Enoder were barbarously murdered on the day before in the home of Captain Peter Pollard at the bridge by one John Trehenban the son of Humphrey and Cissily Trehenban of this Parish at about 11 O' clock in the forenoon upon a market day.

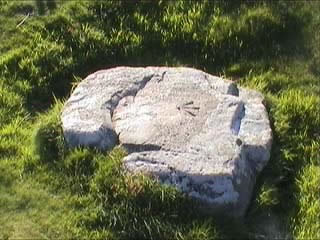
The stone at Castle an Dinas on which the cage stood and Trehenban starved

== Legends attached to the murder ==
- Trehenban pretended to help in finding the murderer riding on horseback following the bloodhounds. His hat blew off and the dogs wouldn't leave it. Eventually he confessed.
- The lane where the bloodhounds picked up the scent is still known as 'Tremons lane'.
- He was placed in a cage which sat on a large rock. This rock is still to be seen and local people used to say that if you ran around this rock fifty times you would hear his chains rattle.
- Tremmon begged a passing woman for some food. All she had were a few tallow candles which he ate ravenously.
- According to local historian Marshel Arthur, local people used to refer to a no-gooder as 'a right Tremmon'.

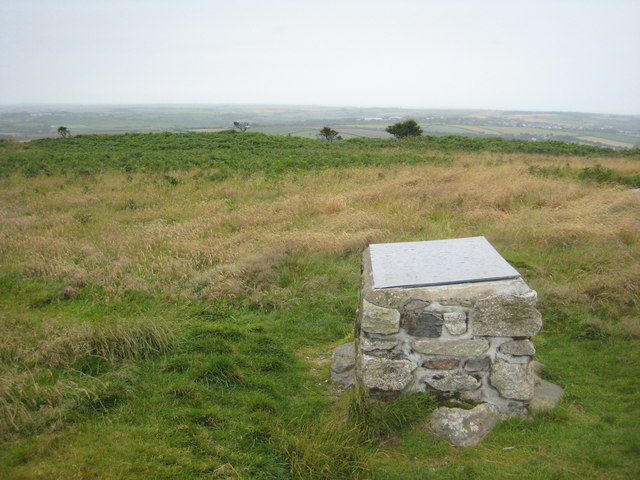
The stone now covered by viewpoint
