= Tregoss =

Hamlet in Cornwall, England

Coordinates: 50°24′33″N 4°51′51″W

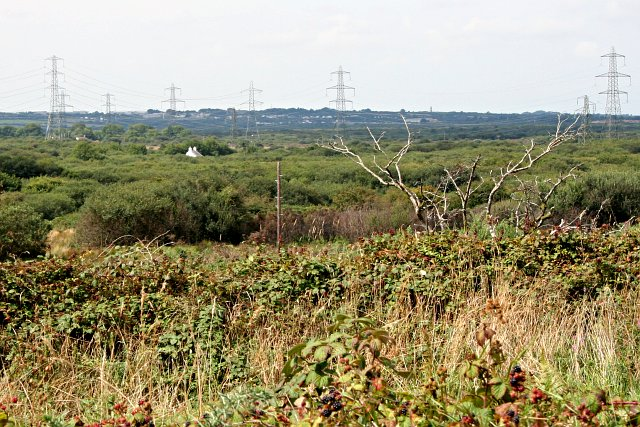
Tregoss Moor

Tregoss (Cornish: Tregors) is a hamlet in the parish of Roche, Cornwall, England, United Kingdom. To the east is Tregoss Moor.
