= Mary Kelly (journalist) =

American television and radio reporter

Mary Ellen Agnes Kelly (1926-2005?) was a US television and radio reporter and producer. Kelly was part of the staff for the first production of the Today Show in 1952. During her Today Show career, Kelly travelled the world for her reporting. She interviewed celebrities, including Audrey Hepburn and Mel Ferrer, and reported on many international events, including Grace Kelly’s wedding and the inaugural commercial flight over the North Pole. She later hosted her own radio show, “Mary’s Notebook.”

== Early life ==
Mary Kelly grew up in Hartford, Connecticut. She attended Hartford Junior Business College. She planned to be a home economics teacher. While in Connecticut, Kelly worked as a typist for Connecticut General Life Insurance Company.

== Early career ==
In 1945 at the age of 19, Kelly moved to New York for a copywriter position at the New York Times. She spent only four months at the newspaper. She took a secretarial position at a law firm. Kelly then worked as a theatrical press agent.

From 1947 to 1949, Kelly worked at King Features Syndicate. She was part of the sales promotion department. The company paid for her to attend the Columbia School of Journalism to take night classes.

After her sale promotion department position, Kelly took a job as secretary to the producer of the Ted Mack's The Original Amateur Hour. Her role later transitioned into becoming a script writer and talent auditions. She then began working at NBC on the Broadway Open House late night show as assistant to the producer.

== Career at the Today Show ==
Mary Kelly transitioned within NBC from the Broadway Open House to the Today Show in 1951. She worked as an assistant to the producer and a human interest reporter. Kelly was part of the staff when the first show aired in January 1952.

Kelly worked with Today Show guests, doing preliminary interviews as well as making arrangements, picking them up for the show, and ensuring they were on schedule. While she did mostly behind the scenes work, she also got on-air time. Mary Kelly became Dave Garroway’s “gal helper,” writing copy for the Today Show’s host. She also presented stories herself on air.

In 1953, Kelly was assigned to an international tour with the Today Show’s mascot, J. Fred Muggs the chimpanzee. During the tour, they visited Paris, Rome, Nairobi, Cairo, Beirut, Hong Kong, Tokyo, Honolulu, Los Angeles, Mexico City, Havana, and San Juan. Besides watching after Muggs, Kelly supervised filming and wrote press releases.

Kelly reported on several notable and historic events. Kelly attended the wedding of Grace Kelly and Prince Ranier of Monaco. In 1957, she broadcast from the first commercial plane to ever fly the North Pole. She interviewed Audrey Hepburn and Mel Ferrer. She reported on the sinking of the ocean liner SS Andrea Doria in 1956. She also participated in a story called “Around the world in 80 hours,” a trip that took a total of 71 hours and 51 minutes to fly around the world.

With all of her national and international reporting taking her an estimated 50,000 miles annually, Kelly assumed the position of producer-writer of special features. In November 1957, she was promoted to associate producer. Throughout her time working on the show, women wrote to Kelly asking for advice on how to begin their own careers in the television and broadcasting field.

Mary Kelly left her job at the Today Show in November 1958. Her nine-year career at the Today Show consisted of international and historic reporting.

== Later life ==
Kelly later had to stop her career due to a recovery from a health issue. She moved to Nassau, Bahamas in 1960. In 1962, she began her own weekly radio show, “Mary’s Notebook.” Kelly interviewed many people on the radio show, including interviewing the former Bahamian Prime Minister, Sir Lynden Pindling annually for 17 years. The show was one of the longest running radio shows in the Bahamas.

After her death, Mary Kelly was honored in 2016 as one of Bahamas “43 Cultural Legends” as part of Bahama's 43rd Independence Anniversary Celebrations.
