= Kelly, Devon =

Village in Devon, England

Coordinates: 50°36′37″N 4°16′10″W

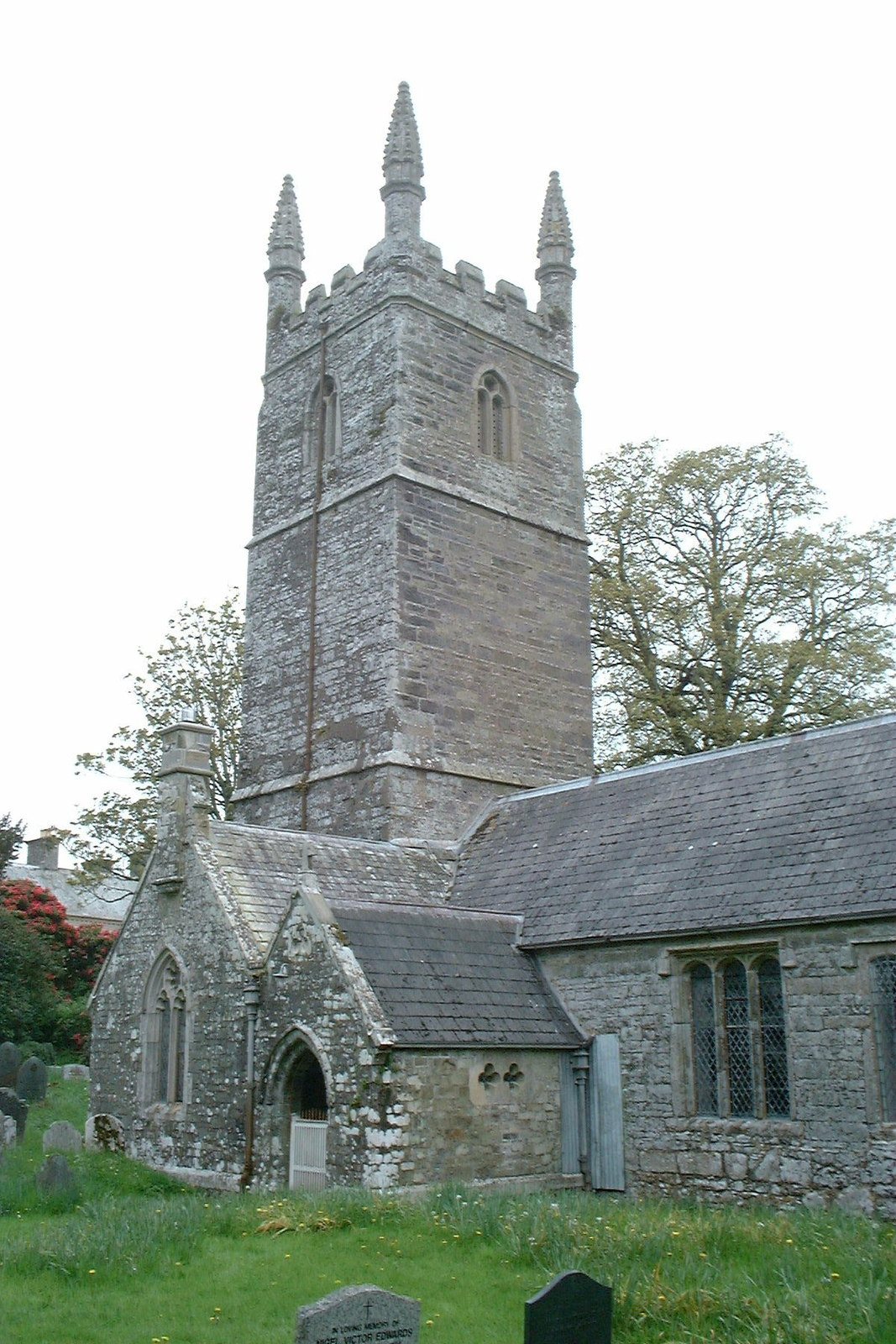
St Mary the Virgin, Kelly

Kelly is a small village in west Devon, England.

The village church is largely Perpendicular of the 15th century but the chancel is earlier than the rest of the building, perhaps 14th century, and the south chancel aisle has windows of 1710 though in the Perpendicular style.

Kelly House is mid-18th century but its predecessor, the Tudor house, was on a different site nearby and is still in existence.

== Name ==
Kelly the name derives from the Cornish for 'grove'. This village was named Chelli in Old English (1166 A.D.), and Chenleie in the Anglo-Norman of the 1086 Domesday Book. Both these forms show mutation of the initial letter, again a feature of Celtic languages, where the initial letter 'mutates' when other words are place in front of it – in this case it would probably have originally been 'An Chelli' for 'the grove', where 'chelli' is the mutated form of 'Kelli', 'grove' in Old Cornish.
