= Kelly House, Devon =

Kelly House
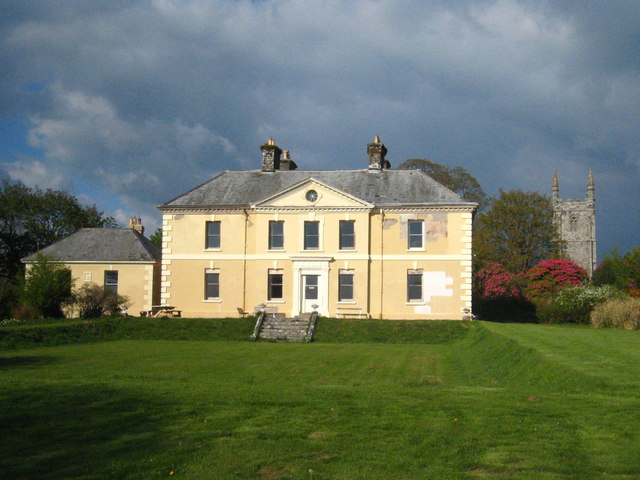

- Location within Devon
- 50°36′38″N 4°16′18″W
- Type: country house
- Location: Kelly, Devon, England

History
- Built: 16th to 18th centuries

Site notes
- Architect: Abraham Rundle

Listed Building – Grade I
- Official name: Kelly House
- Designated: 14 June 1952
- Reference no.: 1318194

Kelly House is a Grade I listed country house and estate located in the village of Kelly, in Devon, England.

The estate has been the property of the Kelly family since approximately 1100. Parts of the original medieval house and great hall are still standing, though they are obscured from view, as this part of the house was significantly remodelled in the Tudor architectural style. In 1742 the west wing of the building was constructed in the Georgian architectural style and surrounded by parkland. The most recent north wing of Kelly House was built in 1877. During the twentieth century parts of the estate were sold off, and the house fell into disrepair.

A description of life in the house and village during the first world war was written as a diary by Margaret Kelly, the lady of the house at the time. It includes details of the running of the house. After the war Mary Kelly founded the Village Drama Society, which was based at Kelly House from 1919 until about 1925. Kelly House continues to be inhabited by members of the Kelly family while opening some rooms for bed and breakfast basis.

The house was added to the Heritage at Risk Register due to concerns particularly about the leaking roof. Parts of the house have been restored, with students from Kelly College assisting with the works. These parts of the house are open to the public through guided tours, and since 2013 the house has offered three bedrooms as bed & breakfast accommodation.

In April 2010, Kelly House was the subject of a Channel 4 television programme presented by hotelier Ruth Watson as part of her Country House Rescue series.

== Arms of Kelly ==
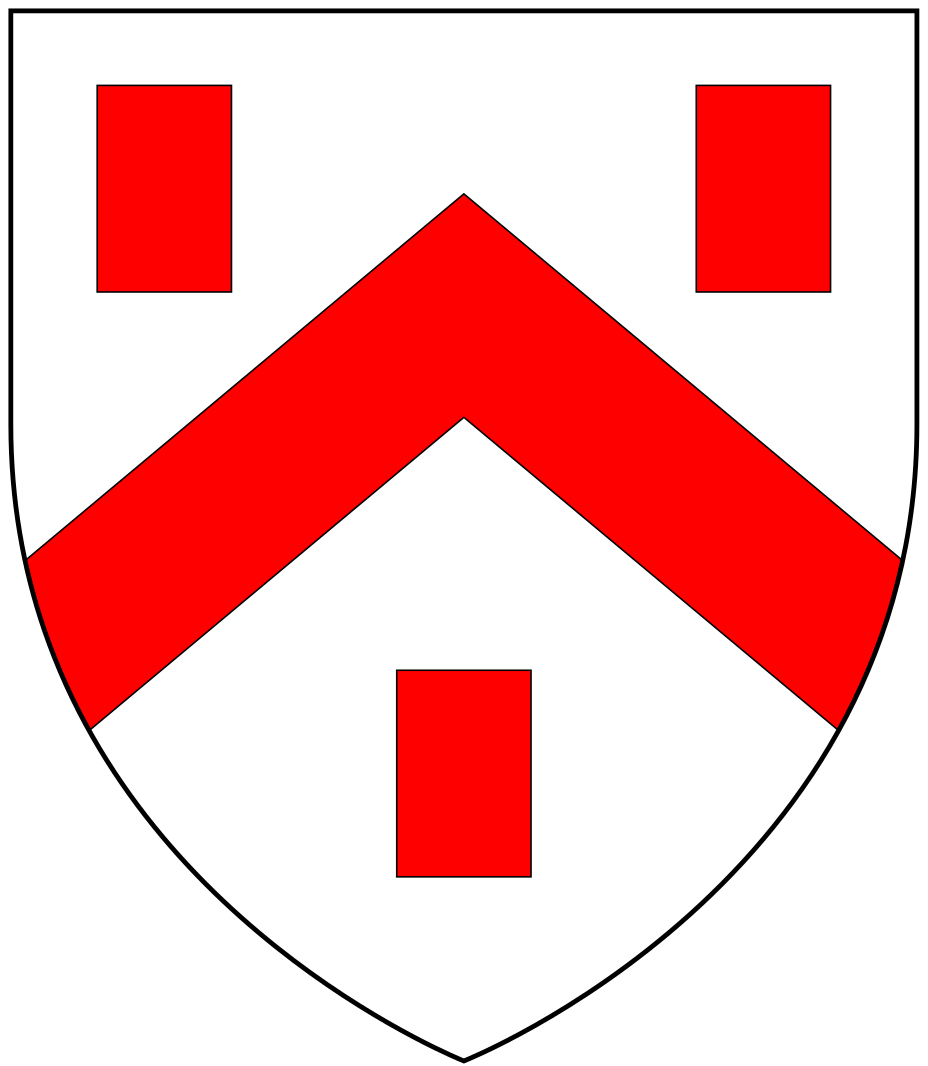
Arms of Kelly

The coat of arms of the head of the family of Kelly is recorded in 16th century Visitations of Devon and is blazoned argent, a chevron between three billets gules.
