= Marshel Arthur =

British historian

Marshel Arthur (1879–1962) was a china clay worker and historian from Cornwall, UK.

After the death of his father Marshel left school at the age of ten in 1889 and began work as a tool boy under his older brother Tom, at Lower Goonamaris China Stone Quarry in January 1890. He recalled his experiences in his autobiography (completed in 1955): Autobiography of a China Clay Worker: with a Short History of the Rise of the China Clay Industry, St Austell: Federation of Old Cornwall Societies, (1995) ISBN 0-902660-23-3
