= St Mawgan and Colan (electoral division) =

Former electoral division of Cornwall in the UK

- Former ward Cornwall Council
- Boundary of St Mawgan and Colan in from 2013-2021.
- County: Cornwall

2013–2021
- Number of councillors: One
- Replaced by: St Columb Minor and Colan; St Columb Major, St Mawgan and St Wenn
- Created from: Colan and Mawgan

St Mawgan and Colan (Cornish: Lannhernow ha Kolan) was an electoral division of Cornwall in the United Kingdom which returned one member to sit on Cornwall Council from 2013 to 2021. It was abolished at the 2021 local elections, being succeeded by St Columb Minor and Colan and St Columb Major, St Mawgan and St Wenn.

== Councillors ==
Election	Member	Party
2013	John Fitter	Conservative
2017	John Fitter	Conservative
2020	John Fitter	Independent (Note: Fitter quit the Conservatives in August 2020 after they did not select him as a candidate for the 2021 elections where the number of seats on the council was decreasing from 123 to 87.)
2021	Seat abolished	

== Extent ==
St Mawgan and Colan covered the villages of Quintrell Downs, St Mawgan, Colan and the hamlets of Mountjoy, Chapel, Trebarber, Tregurrian, Mawgan Porth. The division covered 4,835 hectares in total.

== Election results ==
=== 2017 election ===
2017 election: St Mawgan and Colan
Party	Candidate	Votes	%	±%
Conservative	John Fitter	728	61.1	
Independent	William Corbett	277	23.2	
Liberal Democrats	Anne Chappell	181	15.2	
Majority		451	37.8	
Rejected ballots		6	0.5	
Turnout		1192	36.4	
Independent gain from Conservative		Swing		

=== 2013 election ===
2013 election: St Mawgan and Colan
Party	Candidate	Votes	%	±%
Conservative	John Fitter	588	75.5	
Mebyon Kernow	Rob Poole	185	23.7	
Majority		403	51.7	
Rejected ballots		6	0.8	
Turnout		779	28.6	
Conservative win (new seat)				
