= St Columb Minor and Colan (electoral division) =

Electoral division of Cornwall in the UK

- ward Cornwall Council
- Boundary of St Columb Minor and Colan in Cornwall from 2021.
- County: Cornwall

Current ward
- Created: 2021
- Councillor: Vacant
- Number of councillors: One

St Columb Minor and Colan is an electoral division of Cornwall in the United Kingdom which returns one member to sit on Cornwall Council. It was created at the 2021 local elections. At the 2025 election it was won by Christine Parsonage, a member of Reform UK, who subsequently left Reform UK before resigning as a councillor.

== Extent ==
The division includes the villages of St Columb Minor, Colan and Quintrell Downs, as well as the hamlets of Whipsiderry, Lane, Mountjoy, Trebarber. The division also includes most of the hamlets of Tregurrian and White Cross, which are shared with St Columb Major, St Mawgan and St Wenn and St Dennis and St Enoder respectively.

== Councillors ==
Election	Member	Party
2021	John Fitter	Independent
2025	Christine Parsonage	Reform UK
December 2025 by-election	Heinz Glanville	Reform UK

== Election results ==
=== 2021 election ===
2021 election: St Columb Minor and Colan
Party	Candidate	Votes	%	±%
Independent	John Fitter	662	51.1	N/A
Conservative	Mark Formosa	622	48.0	N/A
Majority		40	3.1	N/A
Rejected ballots		11	0.8	
Turnout		1,295		
Independent win (new seat)				

=== 2025 election ===
2025 election: St Columb Minor and Colan
Party	Candidate	Votes	%	±%
Reform	Christine Parsonage	507	35.8	New
Independent	John Fitter	414	29.3	−21.8
Conservative	Mark Formosa	238	16.8	−31.2
Labour	Nicola Tettmar	120	8.5	New
Liberal Democrats	Pauline Avery	118	8.3	New
Independent	Nigel May	15	1.1	New
Majority		93	6.6	+3.5
Rejected ballots		3	0.2	-0.6
Turnout		1415	30.2	
Registered electors		4,686		
Reform gain from Independent				

Parsonage, who lives in Torpoint, 40 miles (64 km) from her division, was a paper candidate for Reform UK and did not expect to be elected. This led to criticism from independent councillors about her ability to represent the division; Parsonage said that living outside of the division "means I don't have any conflict of interest, so I can speak unencumbered". In August 2025, Newquay Town Council, which covers part of the division, wrote to Parsonage asking her to attend town council meetings due to members' concerns about her "continued absence". Parsonage responded that due to her work as a nurse, she could not attend town council meetings in Newquay but highlighted that she attended Cornwall Council meetings and answered correspondence. In September 2025, it was reported that Parsonage had taken a leave of absence in order to "concentrate on her wellbeing". She resigned in October 2025 due to health reasons, triggering a by-election.

=== 2025 by-election ===
18 December 2025 by-election: St Columb Minor and Colan
Party	Candidate	Votes	%	±%
Reform	Heinz Glanville	408	31.7	−4.1
Independent	John Fitter	325	25.2	−4.1
Liberal Democrats	Geoff Brown	296	23.0	+14.7
Green	Frances Williamson	173	13.43	New
Conservative	Mark Formosa	73	5.7	−11.1
Labour	Stuart Hinde	9	0.7	−7.8
Independent	Nigel May	3	0.2	−0.9
Majority		83	6.4	−0.2
Rejected ballots		0	0.0	-0.2
Turnout		1288	27.7	−2.5
Registered electors		4,658		
Reform hold				

BBC News said the by-election had been "tightly fought". Glanville said his priorities would be opposing a park and rail site at Quintrell Downs and campaigning for housing for young people. Fitter, a former councillor for the division, said he would probably retire from politics after his defeat. Leigh Frost, the Liberal Democrat leader of Cornwall Council, highlighted his party's increase in vote share in response to the result.
