= Colan, Cornwall =

Village and civil parish in Cornwall, England

Coordinates: 50.412°N 5.002°W

Colan: Cornish: Kolan
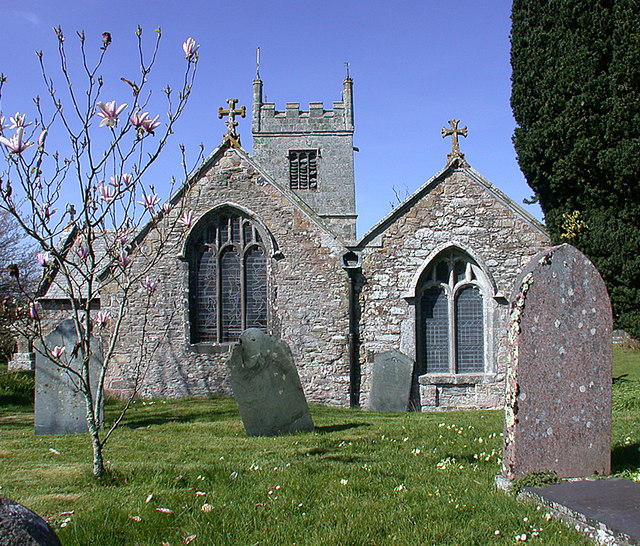

- Location within Cornwall
- Population: 1,696 (United Kingdom Census 2011 including Bosoughan)
- OS grid reference: SW868613
- Civil parish: Colan
- Unitary authority: Cornwall
- Ceremonial county: Cornwall
- Region: South West
- Country: England
- Sovereign state: United Kingdom
- Post town: NEWQUAY
- Postcode district: TR8
- Dialling code: 01637
- Police: Devon and Cornwall
- Fire: Cornwall
- Ambulance: South Western
- UK Parliament: St Austell and Newquay

Colan (Cornish: Kolan) is a village and civil parish in mid-Cornwall, England, United Kingdom. It is situated approximately three miles (5 km) east of Newquay. The electoral ward is called Colan and Mawgan. The population of this ward at the 2011 census was 4,256 The hamlets of Bosoughan, Chapel, Gwills, Kestle Mill, Lane, Mountjoy, Quintrell Downs, Trebarber and Trencreek are in the parish. The Fir Hill, and Firhill Woods near Nanswhyden, contains the ruins of Fir Hill Manor. Colan Church dates back to the thirteenth century.

== Cornish wrestling ==
Cornish wrestling tournaments, for prizes, were held at Colan.
