= Baron Arundell of Trerice =

Extinct barony in the Peerage of England

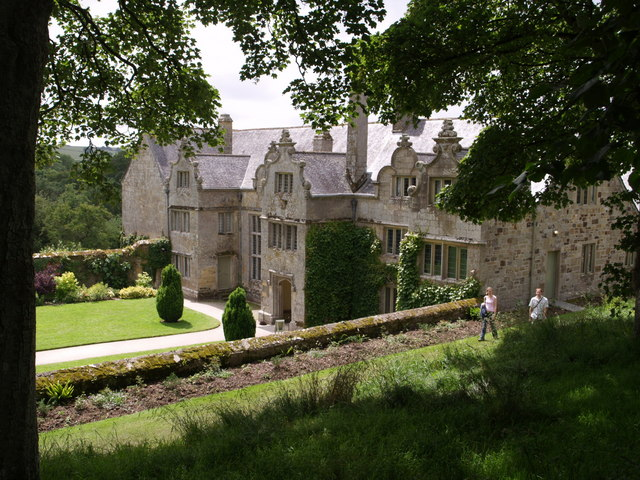
Trerice, the seat of the Arundell family.

Baron Arundell of Trerice, in the County of Cornwall, was a title in the Peerage of England. It was created in 1664 for the Royalist soldier and politician Richard Arundell. He was the second son of Sir John Arundell and the great-grandson of Admiral Sir John Arundell. He was succeeded by his son, the second Baron. He sat as a Member of Parliament for Truro. The title became extinct on the death of his grandson, the fourth Baron, in 1768.

The family seat was Trerice, Cornwall.

== Barons Arundell of Trerice (1664) ==
- Richard Arundell, 1st Baron Arundell of Trerice (d. 1687)
- John Arundell, 2nd Baron Arundell of Trerice (1649–1698)
- John Arundell, 3rd Baron Arundell of Trerice (1678–1706)
- John Arundell, 4th Baron Arundell of Trerice (1701–1768)

== Family tree of the Arundells of Trerice ==
Following is a partial family tree of the Arundell family of Trerice; the Barons are highlighted; click on the image to get a full-screen version that you can zoom in on:

== See also ==
- Arundell family
- Baron Arundell of Wardour
