= Porth Reservoir =

Reservoir in Cornwall, England

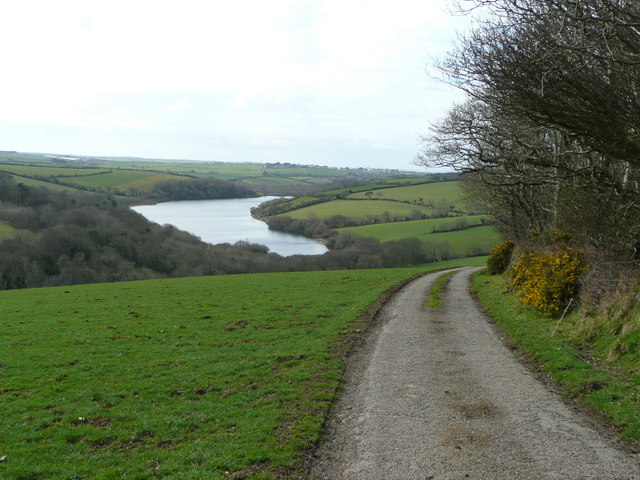
- View west from the road to Nanswhyden

- Location within Cornwall
- Location: Cornwall
- Coordinates: 50°25′11″N 5°0′5″W
- Type: Reservoir
- Basin countries: United Kingdom
- Surface area: 40 acres (16 ha)
- Surface elevation: c.100ft (30 m)

Porth Reservoir is a reservoir in Cornwall, England, most of which is in the parish of Colan. The concrete dam was completed in 1960, and the lake has a net capacity of approximately 113,000,000 gallons (514,000,000 litres).

The reservoir has an area of about 40 acres (0.16 km^{2}), and a perimeter of approximately 3 miles (4.8 km). It now operates as a coarse fishery, with a nature reserve at one end.

The reservoir is principally fed by the small river that starts near Ruthvoes, about 4 miles (6 km) to the east. From the reservoir's outlet, the river flows to St Columb Porth, where it enters the sea.

Construction of the reservoir and dam was carried out by the Newquay & District Water Company. It was officially opened on 16 June 1960 by A. C. McLellan, then president of the Institution of Water Engineers.

== See also ==
- St Columb Major
- List of reservoirs and dams in the United Kingdom
