= Bow window =

Curved bay window

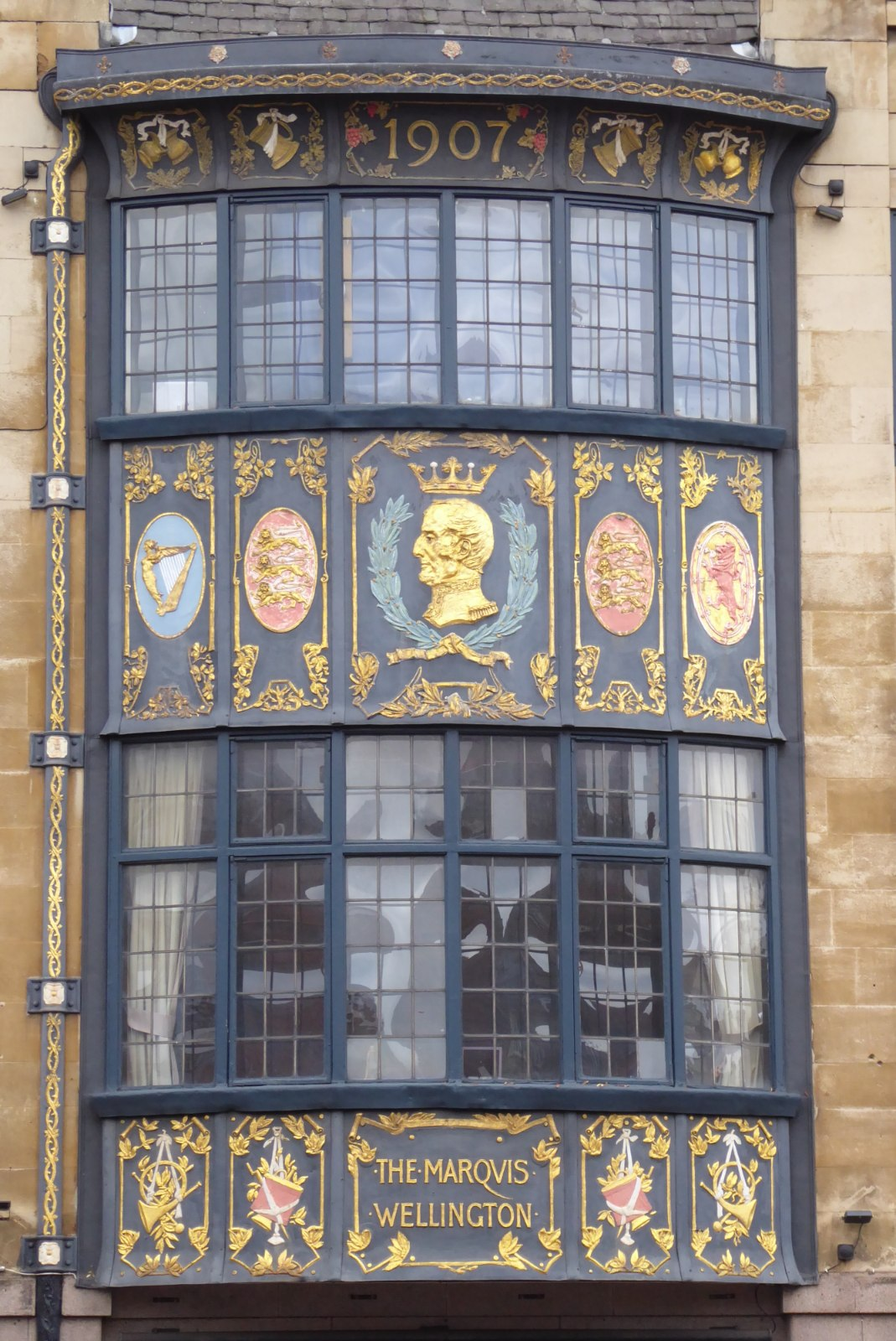
Decorative bow window facade, U.K.

A bow window or compass window is a curved bay window. Like bay windows, bow windows add space to a room by projecting beyond the exterior wall of a building and provide a wider view of the garden or street outside than flush windows, but combine four or more facets, differentiating them from the more common three-sided bay window. Casement windows are often used for ventilation.

Bow windows first appeared in the eighteenth century in the United Kingdom (and in the Federal period in the United States).

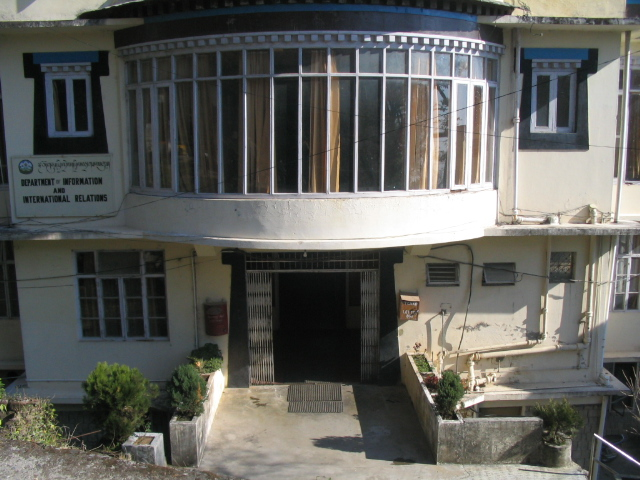
Many-sided bow window at the Department of Information and International Relations of the Central Tibetan Administration

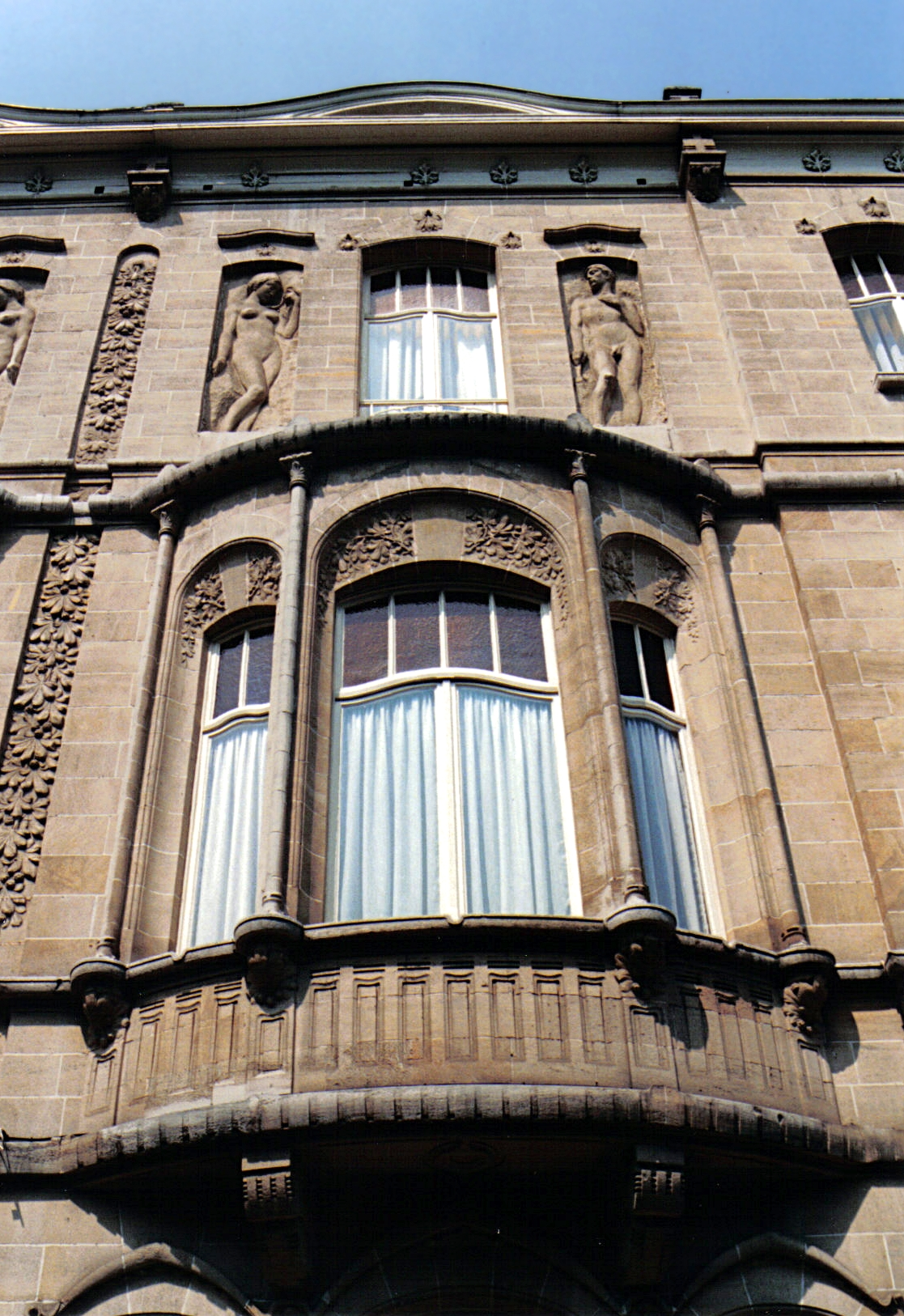
Four-sash Art Nouveau style bow window on the Boulevard De Smet de Nayer in Brussels

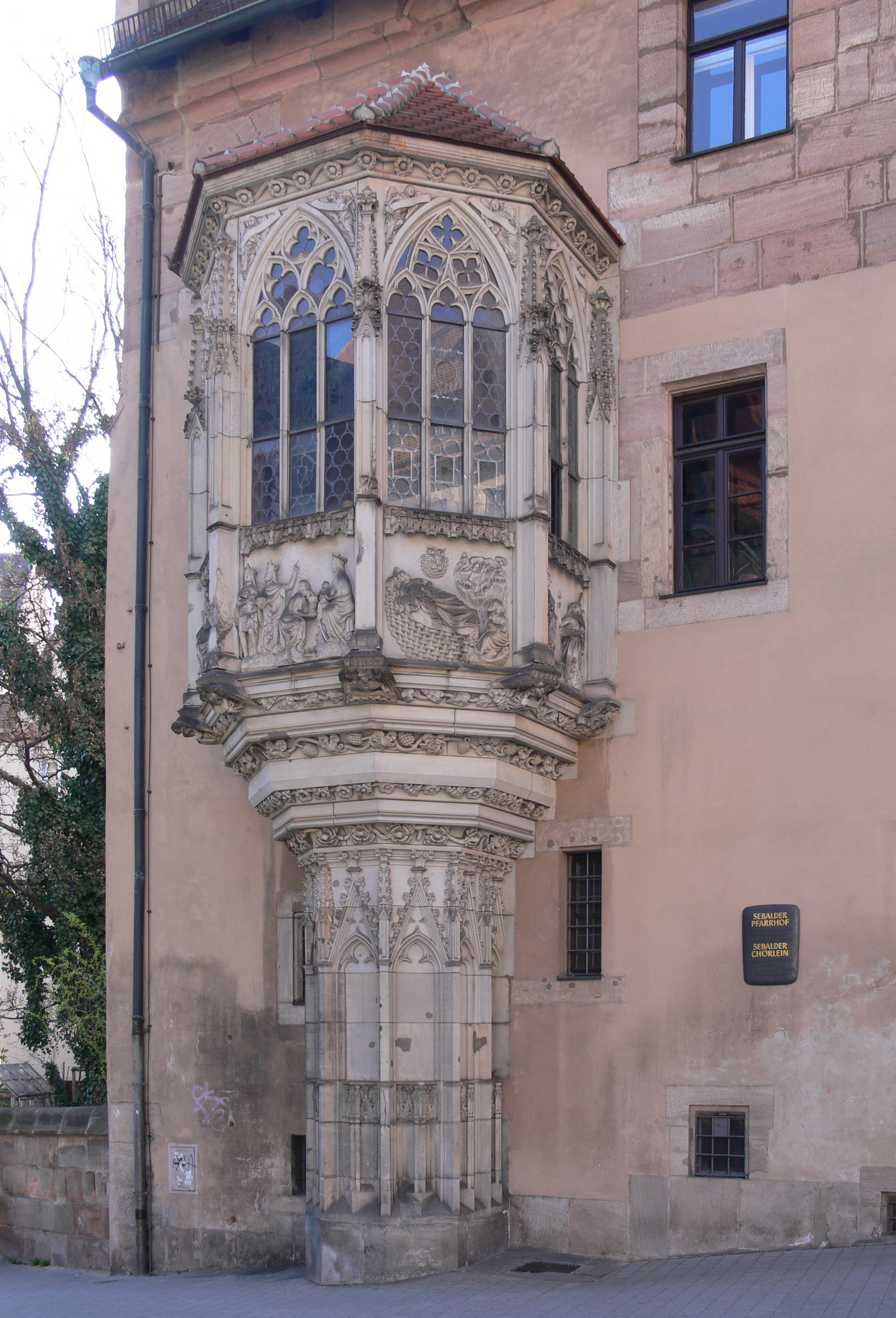
Five-sided chörlein at the parsonage of St. Sebaldus Church, Nuremberg, before 1361

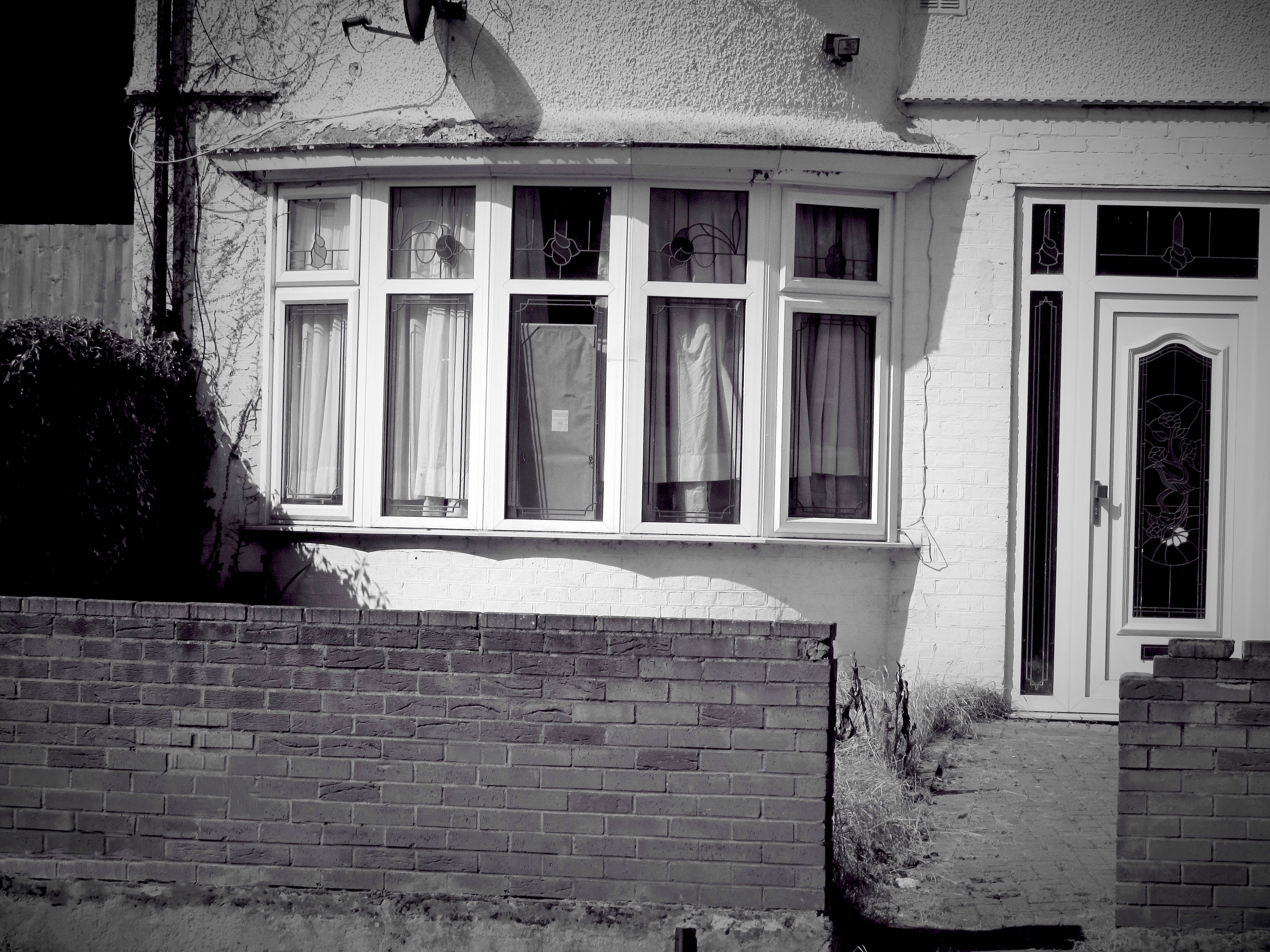
Five-pane oriel-style bow window

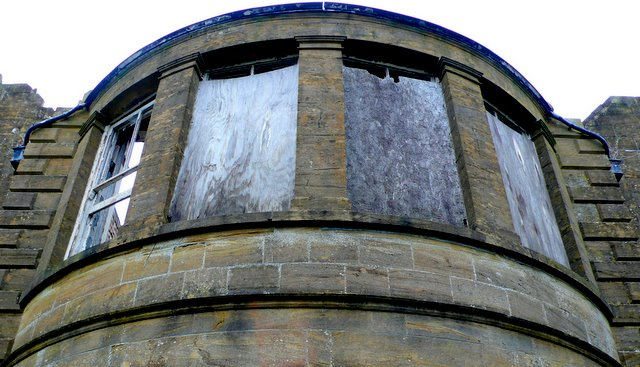
Five-sided bow window at Balidon House, North Coker, Yeovil, Somerset

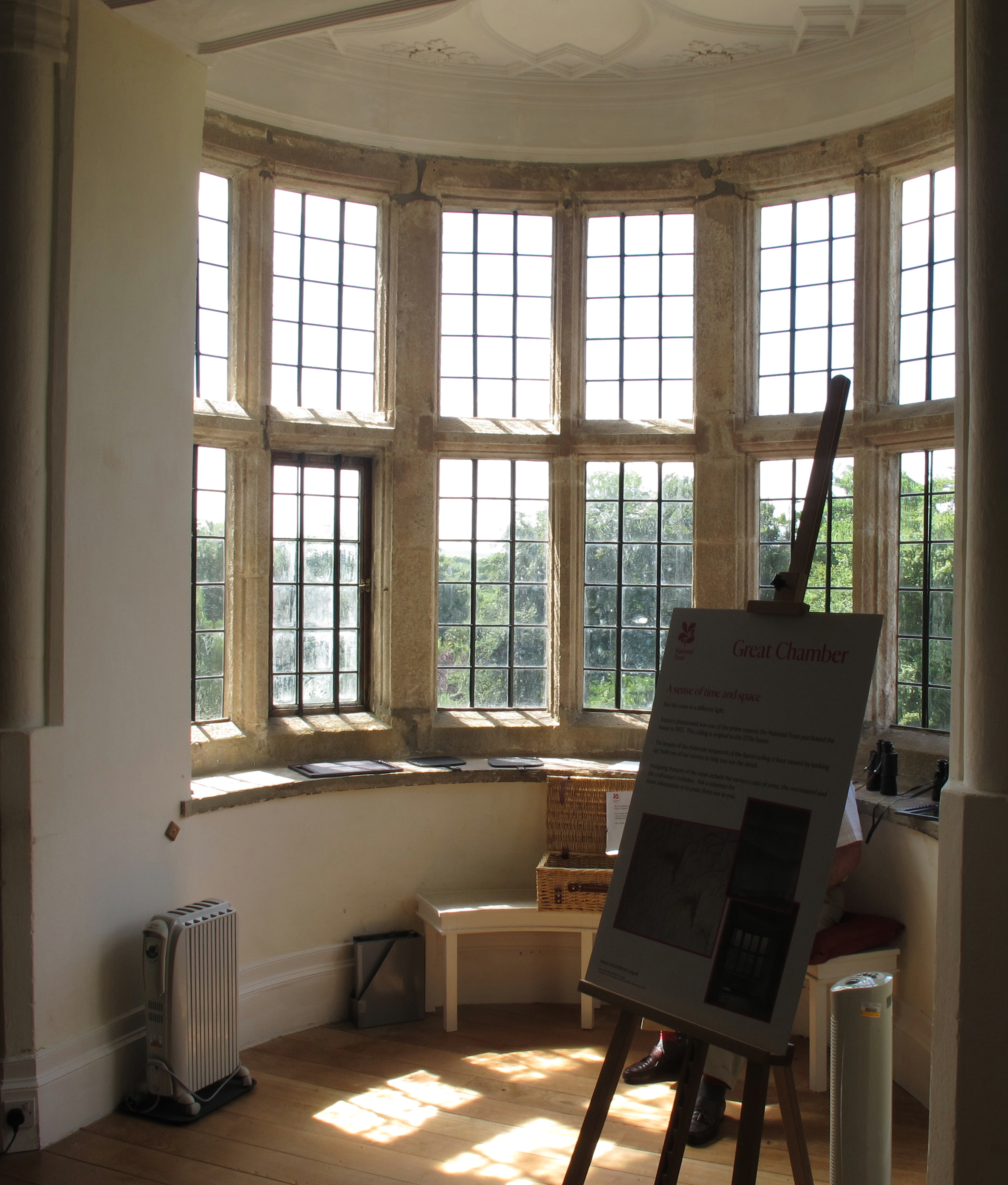
Interior view of bow window at Trerice

== See also ==
- Bay window
- Oriel window
