= Mary Arundell =

Mary Arundell may refer to:

- Mary Arundell (courtier) (died 1557)
- Mary Arundell, Baroness Arundell (c. 1563–1607)
- Mary or Margaret Arundell (died 1691), wife of John Arundell, 2nd Baron Arundell of Trerice
