= Nanswhyden =

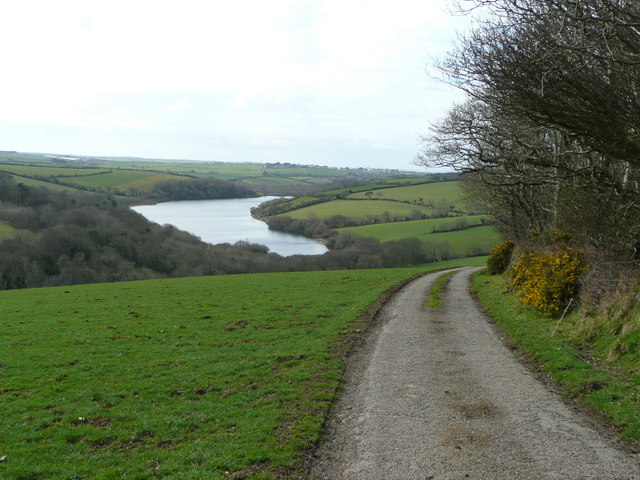
View of Porth Reservoir from the road to Nanswhyden

Nanswhyden was formerly a country estate with a mansion house and formal gardens associated with the Hoblyn Family. It is currently a farm with a farmhouse, yard and woodlands. It is situated in the parish of St Columb Major in Cornwall. The mansion house was destroyed by fire on 30 November 1803.

== Nanswhyden House ==
The estate was purchased by Richard Hoblyn in 1581. The grand house was built in a Palladian-influenced design in approximately 1740. It was reputed to be the most expensive houses built in Cornwall, at that time. According to Davies Gilbert the historian: "The basement story was built of granite, the upper part with a light coloured slate, or killas, and the whole lined with brick; the door cases, windows, pediment and balustrades were of the Ionic order. The chimney pieces, which were finished in Italy, were remarkably elegant, in respect of the richness of the marble, the delicacy of the design, and the excellence of the sculpture. The library occupied two rooms, the longest of which was 36ft in length, 24ft broad and 16ft high; and all the other apartments were equal in design, and finished throughout in a style in which elegance and comfort were alike combined."

== Hoblyn Family ==
The last person of the direct line of Hoblyns to live at the property was a Robert Hoblyn. Following his death, the property passed to a relative, known as the Rev Robert Hoblyn of Bath. He had nine children.

== The Fire, November 1803 ==
In 1803 during the tenure of Rev Hoblyn the main house was destroyed by fire. It is reputed that the fire was caused by an oil lamp knocked over by a servant boy. There were no deaths in the fire, that burned for three days. The fire was so intense that molten lead was flowing off the roof. The extensive library was destroyed.

== After the fire ==
Following the fire, the family moved into Nanswhyden farm house. Nothing remains of the house although some outbuildings an stables survive. Following the death of Rev Hoblyn wife the nanswhyden Estate passed to Miss Brune and later it became the property of William Shilston of Tremough In 1855 William Paget Hoblyn (the son of Rev Robert Hoblyn), commissioned a new house for his family at Fir Hill Manor, and in 1860 took up residence there.

== Remains of the house ==
Some of the stone from the ruin was used in the building of a walled garden at Trelowarren
