= Watergate Beach =

Beach in Cornwall, England

Coordinates: 50.444°N 5.040°W

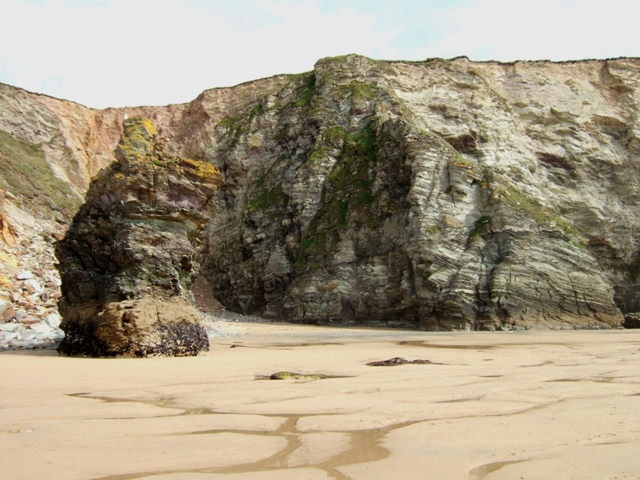
The Horse Rock, Watergate Beach

Watergate Beach is a two-mile-long stretch of sandy beach on the Atlantic coast of north Cornwall, England, United Kingdom. It is situated in Watergate Bay two miles north of Newquay on the B3276 road to Padstow near the village of Tregurrian.

The beach has toilets, a shop and cafe. It is popular for water sports, especially surfing and also for kite-flying and sand art. In May, 2007, the beach hosted the English National Surfing Championships.
