= John Arundell, 2nd Baron Arundell of Trerice =

English politician

Canting arms of Arundell of Trerice: Sable, six martlets argent (from French hirondelle, a swallow)

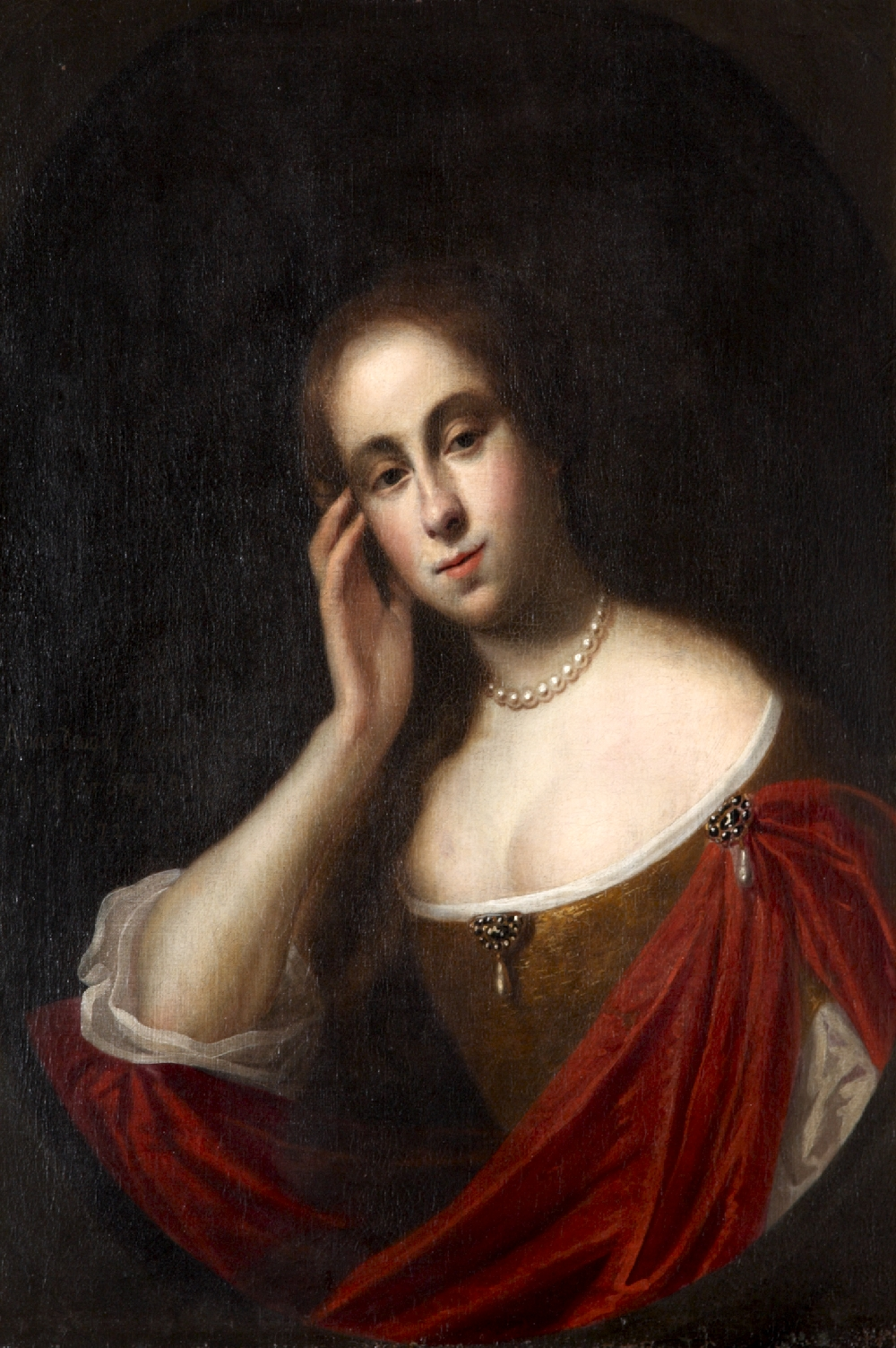
Margaret Acland (died 1691), 1st wife of John Arundell, 2nd Baron Arundell (1649–1698), who although she produced no children, was the connection which ultimately brought Trerice to the Acland family. Portrait circa 1675, British (English) School. Collection of National Trust, Trerice House

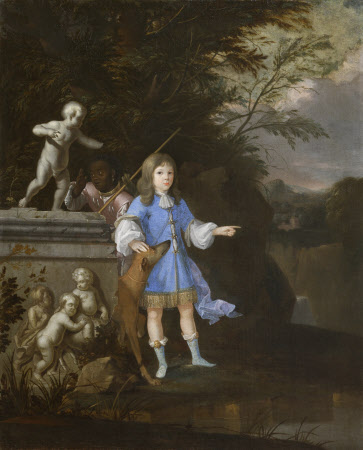
Portrait of a boy, painted circa 1680s, possibly of John Arundell, 3rd Baron Arundell of Trerice (1678–1706), son and heir of the 2nd Baron by his 1st wife. By Gaspar Smitz (1635–1707), National Trust, Trerice House

John Arundell, 2nd Baron Arundell of Trerice (1649 – 21 June 1698) of Trerice, Cornwall, was an English politician who sat in the House of Commons at various times from 1666 until 1687, when he inherited his peerage.

== Origins ==
Arundell was the son and heir of Richard Arundell, 1st Baron Arundell of Trerice, by his wife Gertrude Bagge, daughter of Sir James Bagge, of Saltram, Devon, and widow of Sir Nicholas Slanning. He was baptised on 1 September 1649.

== Career ==
In 1666 Arundell was elected Member of Parliament in the Cavalier Parliament for Truro, Cornwall, and sat until 1679. He was re-elected for Truro in 1685 and sat until 1687, when he moved to the House of Lords, having inherited the title Baron Arundell of Trerice on the death of his father.

== Marriages and children ==
Arundell married twice:

- Firstly to Margaret Acland (died 1691), daughter of Sir John Acland, 3rd Baronet (died 1655), of Columb John, Devon, by his wife Margaret Rolle, a daughter of Denys Rolle (1614–1638) of Bicton and Stevenstone in Devon, Sheriff of Devon in 1636.
  - John Arundell, 3rd Baron Arundell (1678–1706), eldest son and heir.
- Secondly to Barbara Slingsby, daughter of Sir Thomas Slingsby, 2nd Baronet, of Scriven, Yorkshire, and widow of Sir Richard Mauleverer, 4th Baronet, of Allerton Mauleverer, Yorkshire, by whom he had children:
  - Richard Arundell (died 1759), 2nd son, MP for Knaresborough, Clerk of the Pipe, Surveyor of the Works and Master of the Mint. He married Lady Frances Manners, a daughter of John Manners, 2nd Duke of Rutland, KG, (1676–1721), but died childless.

Peerage of England
Preceded by Richard Arundell	Baron Arundell of Trerice; 1687–1698	Succeeded by John Arundell
