= John Paget Figg-Hoblyn =

American taxonomist

John Paget Figg-Hoblyn Ph.D (Biological science) (January 25, 1926 – June 12, 2011) was a university professor, and taxonomist. He came to public attention when a BBC documentary was broadcast about the search for him in 1994, after he had failed to claim an inheritance which included Fir Hill Manor.

== Inheritance dispute ==
Figg-Hoblyn came to public attention in 1994, when the BBC broadcast a documentary about him. In 1965 his father had bequeathed him a 1000-acre estate and the ruins of a manor house, Fir Hill Manor, in Cornwall, England. According to the Official Solicitor, he failed to take up the inheritance. The Official Solicitor was appointed in 1972 to manage the estate for John Figg-Hoblyn in the 1970s when they lost contact with him.

The BBC documentary discovered Figg-Hoblyn was living in a caravan park in California, United States, where he and his sister, Peggy, were following a low-key lifestyle trading in organic produce. The BBC subsequently lost contact with him.

In 2007, the next-in-line to inherit the estate as the eldest male, John Westropp Figg-Hoblyn, put out a call to find John Paget Figg-Hoblyn before the inheritance which included Fir Hill Manor was lost.

John Paget Figg-Hoblyn died in a nursing home on 12 June 2011 at the age of 85.

== Academic career ==
Figg-Hoblyn was educated at Stanford University, California, United States. In 1953, he described a unique species of jewel beetle that he had discovered, which was given the name Acmaeodera nanbrownae. This name is now classified as a junior synonym for Acmaeodera vanduzeei. Dr. Figg-Hoblyn used to have a lab at Stanford University, and taught at San Jose State University.
