= Watergate Bay =

Bay in Cornwall, England

Coordinates: 50°28′N 5°03′W

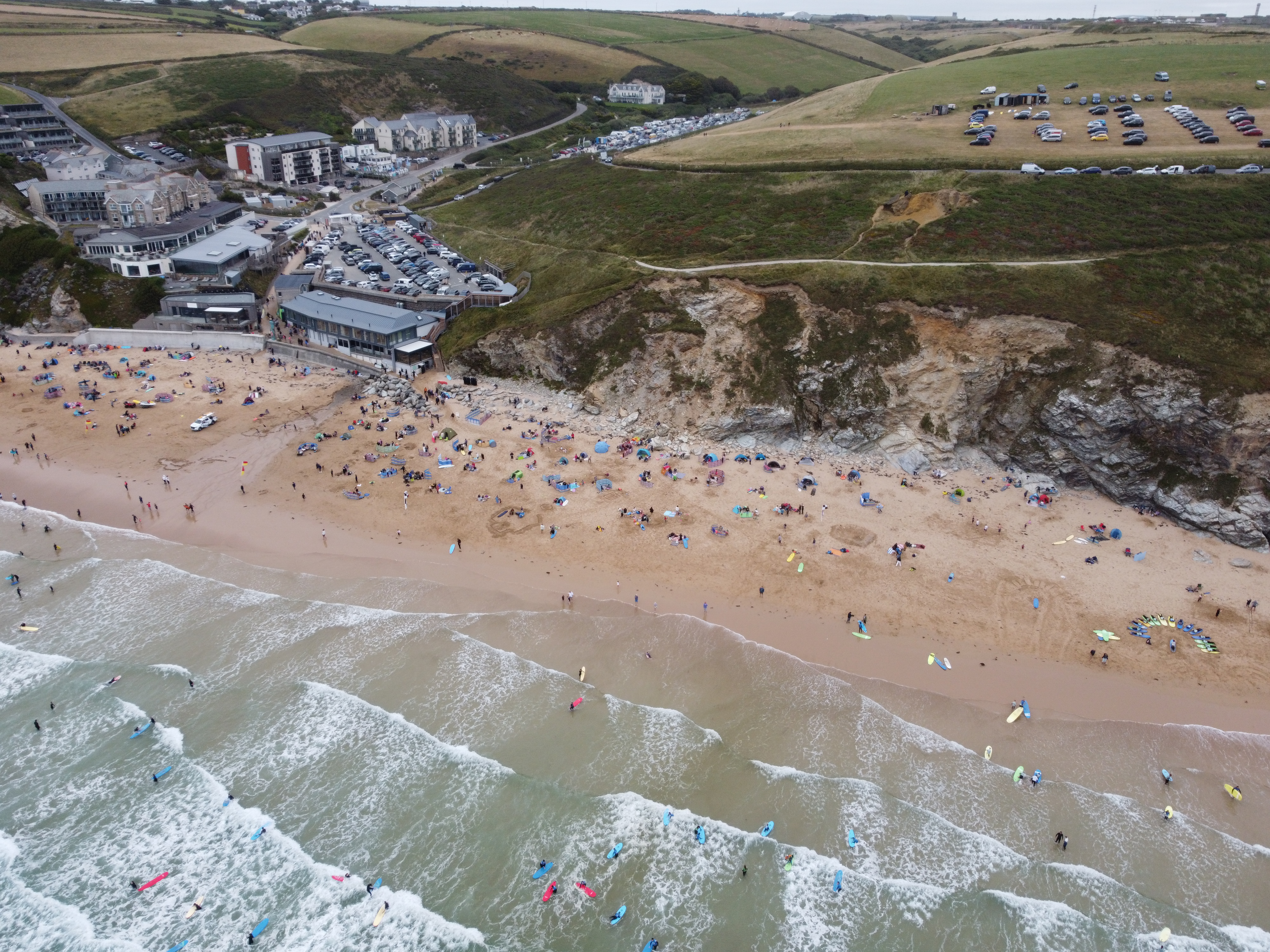
Watergate during the summer

Watergate Bay (Cornish: Porth Tregurien, meaning cove at Urien's farmstead/village) is a long bay or beach flanked by cliffs centred two miles NNE of Newquay below the B3276 Newquay to Padstow road near the hamlet of Tregurrian in Cornwall, United Kingdom. It faces the Atlantic Ocean, adjacent to Newquay Bay. The 2-mile (3.2 km) sandy beach and exposed site is popular for non-powered water sports, kite flying, and sand art.

Since May 2007, Watergate Bay hosts the English Nationals Surfing Championships. In May 2026, it was named the 6th best beach in the UK by Time Out magazine.

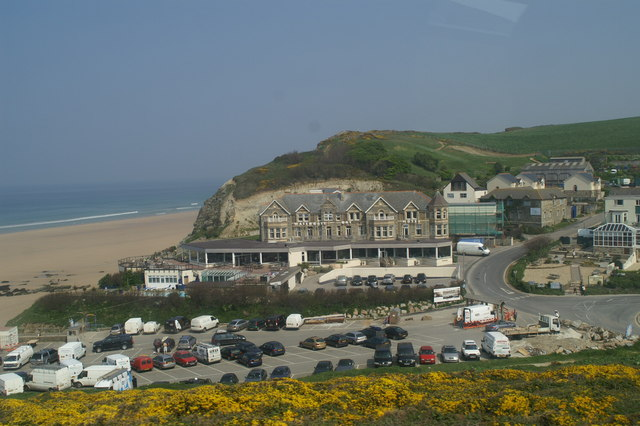
Watergate Bay Hotel

== Watergate Bay Hotel ==
The Watergate Bay Hotel first opened in July 1900. The Hotel was designed by architect Joshua Harrison Goodland. The Hotel hoped to cater for railway tourists that were expected to arrive on the Padstow, Bedruthan & St.Mawgan Railway line, which would also extend to Newquay - however the line was never constructed. Prior to this it was farmland.

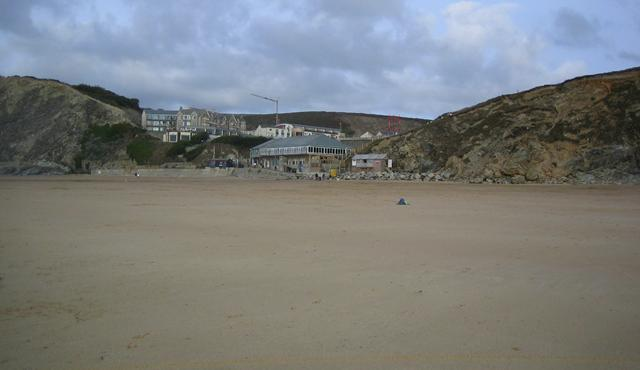
Watergate Bay at low tide

== Cornish wrestling ==
Cornish wrestling tournaments, for prizes, were held in Watergate Bay in the 1900s for the "Burnaby Cup".

See also Cornish wrestling at Tregurrian.

== Film, TV and radio ==
Watergate Bay has been used as a location for the following productions:

- The Magical Legend of the Leprechauns (1999)
- Plunge (2003), a surf movie featuring Kate Winslet.
- Echo Beach (2008), a 12-part TV series that was filmed during the summer of 2007 featuring Jason Donovan and Martine McCutcheon.
- Moving Wallpaper (2008), a behind-the-scenes comedy following the making of Echo Beach.
- BBC Radio 4's Open Country produced a 30-minute BBC Radio Documentary about the bay.
