= Simon Germyn =

Dutch painter

Simon Germyn or Germain (1656–1709), was a Dutch Golden Age painter.

== Biography ==
Germain was born and died in Dordrecht. According to Houbraken he was born the same day as William III of Orange, on November 14, 1650. He was a pupil of Godfried Schalcken and later of Ludowyk Smits, called Hartkamp, who taught him the new way of fruit painting. He was successful at this, but switched to painting landscapes in garden pergola's and other such household decorations. Germyn was still living when Houbraken was writing and had stopped painting in order to devote himself entirely to art dealing.

According to the RKD though he is registered as a pupil of Godfried Schalcken and Caspar Smits, no known works survive that are attributed to him.
