= John Arundell, 4th Baron Arundell of Trerice =

John Arundell, 4th (and last) Baron Arundell (1701-1768) of Trerice, Cornwall, inherited his peerage on the day of the death of his father in 1706. He was the last Baron Arundel of Trerice since he had no heir upon his death and the title ultimately passed to Sir Thomas Dyke Acland.

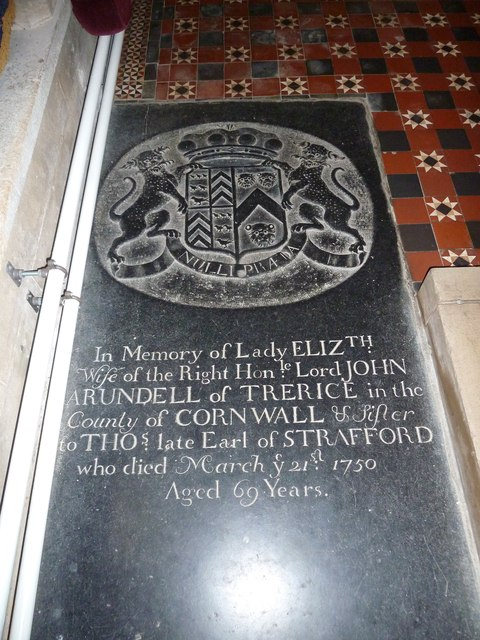

== Origins ==
Arundell was born 21 Nov 1701, the son and heir of John Arundell, 3rd Baron Arundell by his wife Jane Beau, daughter of William Beau of Llandaff, Glamorgan, Wales, who was Bishop of Llandaff.

== Marriages and children ==
- Arundell married Elizabeth Wentworth on 2 Jan 1722, daughter of Sir William Wentworth of Wakefield, Yorkshire, England.
  - They had no children.

== Endings ==
Arundell was buried in Sturminster Marshall, Dorset, England on 13 Aug 1768.

Peerage of England
Preceded by John Arundell	Baron Arundell of Trerice; 1706–1768	Extinct
