= Bosoughan =

Coordinates: 50.4091°N 4.9903°W

- Location within Cornwall
- OS grid reference: SW876608
- Shire county: Cornwall
- Region: South West
- Country: England
- Sovereign state: United Kingdom
- Post town: Newquay
- Postcode district: TR8
- Police: Devon and Cornwall
- Fire: Cornwall
- Ambulance: South Western

Bosoughan is a village in Cornwall, England, United Kingdom, approximately three miles (5 km) east of Newquay. According to the Post Office the population at the 2011 Census was included in the civil parish of Colan.
