= John Arundell, 3rd Baron Arundell of Trerice =

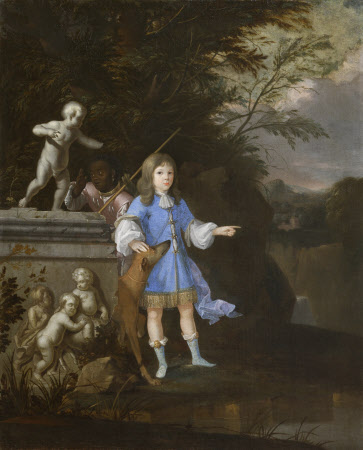
Portrait of a boy, painted circa 1680s, probably John Arundell, 3rd Baron Arundell of Trerice (1678–1706), son and heir of the 2nd Baron by his 1st wife. By Caspar Smitz (1635–1688), National Trust, Trerice House

John Arundell, 3rd Baron Arundell of Trerice (died September 1706) of Trerice, Cornwall, who inherited his peerage on the death of his father in 1698.

== Origins ==
Arundell was the son and heir of John Arundell, 2nd Baron Arundell of Trerice, Cornwall by his wife Margaret Acland (died 1691), daughter of Sir John Acland, of Columb John, Devon, by his wife Margaret Rolle.

== Marriages and children ==
- Arundell married Jane Beau, daughter of William Beau of Llandaff, Glamorgan, Wales, who was Bishop of Llandaff.
  - John Arundell, 4th Baron Arundell (1701–1768), heir.

Peerage of England
| Preceded by John Arundell | Baron Arundell of Trerice; 1698–1706 | Succeeded by John Arundell |
