= Gwills =

Hamlet in Cornwall, England

Coordinates: 50.393°N 5.056°W

Gwills: Cornish: Gwyllys
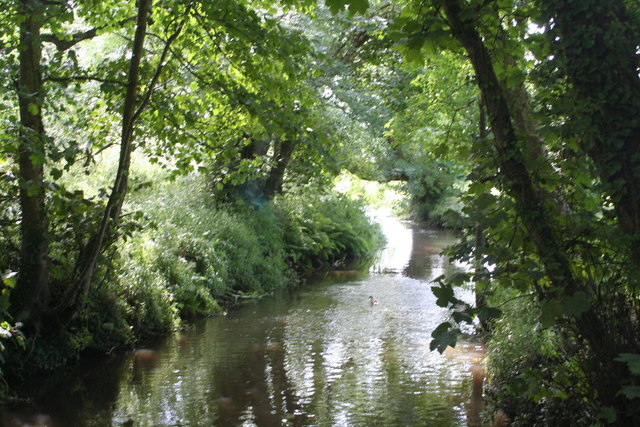
- The River Gannel at Gwills

- Location within Cornwall
- OS grid reference: SW829593
- Civil parish: Colan
- Unitary authority: Cornwall
- Ceremonial county: Cornwall
- Region: South West
- Country: England
- Sovereign state: United Kingdom
- Post town: lHelston
- Postcode district: TR12

Gwills (Cornish: Gwyllys, lit. 'weir') is a hamlet in the parish of Colan, Cornwall, England. According to the Post Office, the population at the 2011 census was included in the civil parish of Gunwalloe.
