= Trencreek =

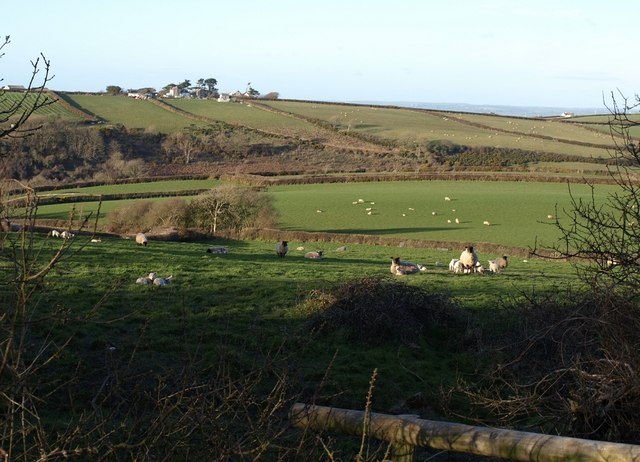
Farmland at Trencreek, Jacobstow

Trencreek is a hamlet in the parish of St Gennys, north Cornwall, England, United Kingdom.

== Blisland ==
Trencreek is also a settlement in the parish of Blisland, north-east Cornwall.

== Grampound with Creed ==
Trencreek is also a settlement in the parish of Grampound with Creed, mid Cornwall.

== Newquay ==
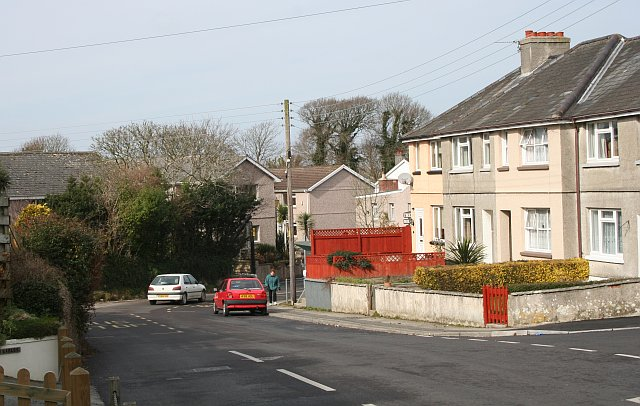
Trencreek, Newquay

Trencreek is also a suburb of Newquay, Cornwall, England, UK.

== Veryan ==
Trencreek is also a settlement in the parish of Veryan, south Cornwall.
