= Lane, Cornwall =

Hamlet in Cornwall, England

Coordinates: 50.402°N 5.056°W

Lane
- Location within Cornwall
- OS grid reference: SW829603
- Civil parish: Colan
- Unitary authority: Cornwall
- Ceremonial county: Cornwall
- Region: South West
- Country: England
- Sovereign state: United Kingdom
- Post town: Newquay
- Postcode district: TR8

Lane is a hamlet in the parish of Colan, Cornwall, England. Its immigrant population is lower than the UK's national average. It also has 20% lower higher and Intermediate managerial, administrative or professional households than the UK's national average.
