= Mountjoy, Cornwall =

Coordinates: 50.403°N 4.997°W

Mountjoy
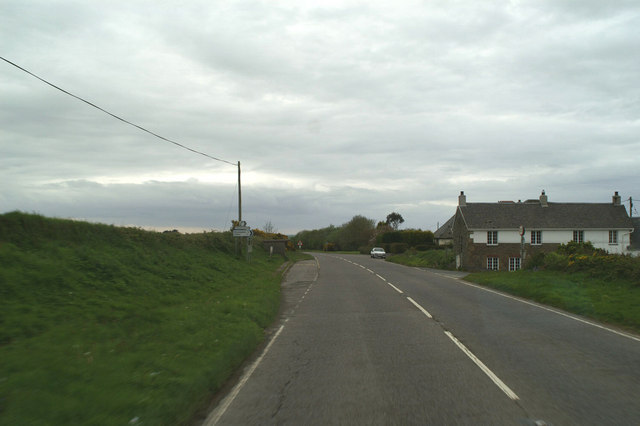
- Mountjoy

- Location within Cornwall
- OS grid reference: SW871602
- Civil parish: Colan
- Unitary authority: Cornwall
- Ceremonial county: Cornwall
- Region: South West
- Country: England
- Sovereign state: United Kingdom

Mountjoy is a hamlet in the civil parish of Colan in Cornwall, England. It is on the A392 road, east of Quintrell Downs.
