= Kestle =

Hamlet in Cornwall, England

Coordinates: 50.394°N 5.026°W

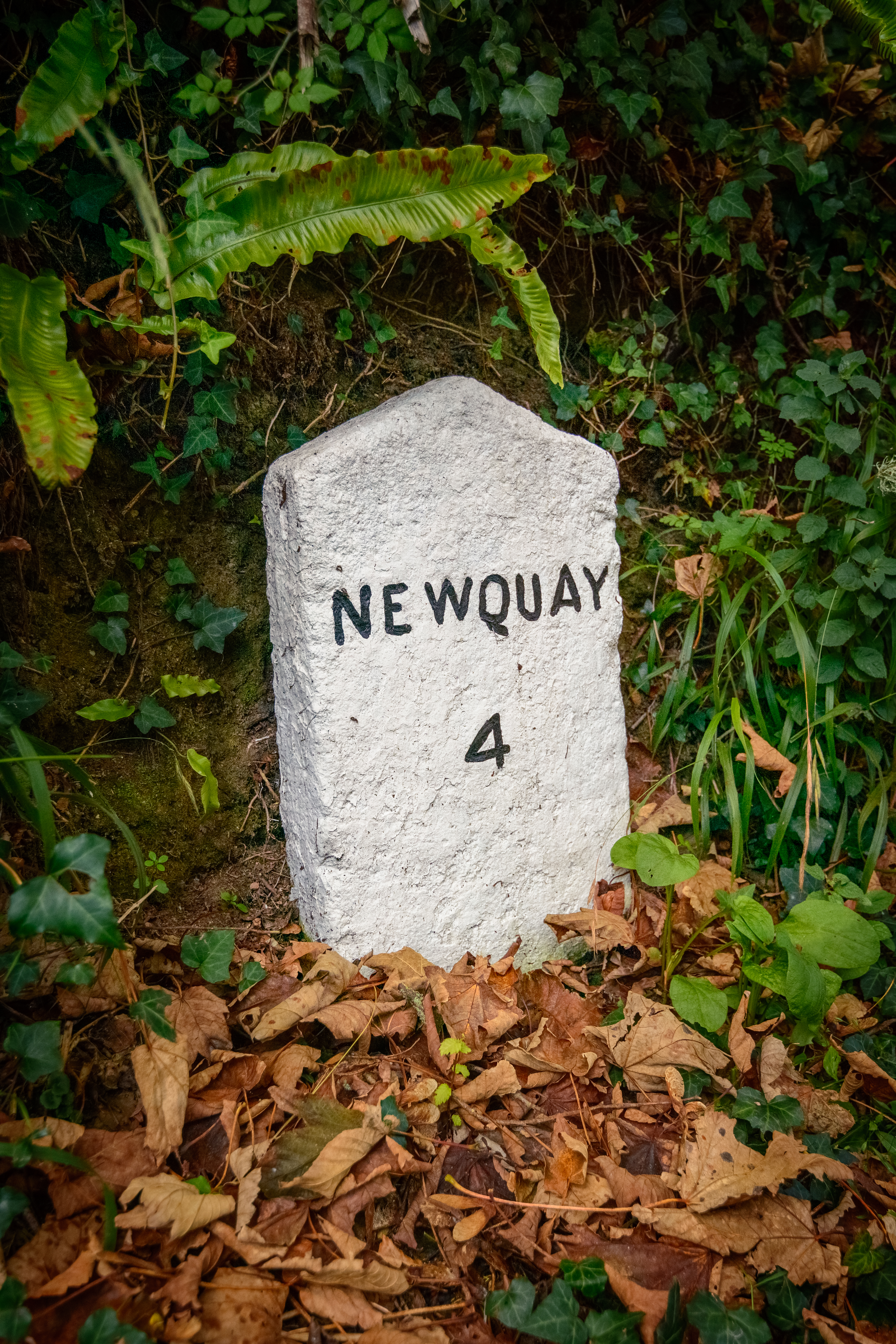
The milestone southeast of Kestle Mill

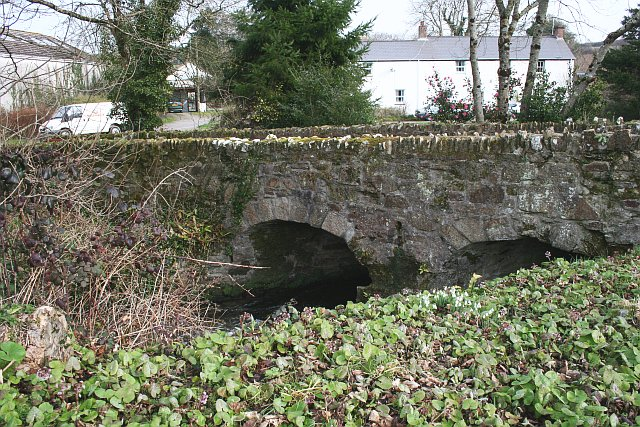
The Old Bridge at Kestle Mill

Kestle and Kestle Mill are hamlets in Cornwall, England. They are situated south of Quintrell Downs; Kestle Mill is on the A3058 main road. It is mostly in the civil parish of St. Newlyn East

Kestle is an ancient village originally named Kestell predating King John but not listed in the Domesday Book.

Kestle Mill stands just back from the road behind the old road bridge. The last recorded use of the mill varies from 1915 to 1950 but photos exist of the mill building and wheel taken during the 1920s which show the mill wheel overgrown and out of use. It is certain that by 1955 the mill was disused and abandoned and around this time the Mill was converted into two cottages. Looking at the mill building from the road today, the old Mill house is on the left hand side and the converted mill is on the right. All that remains of the mill machinery on site are three millstones standing in front of the building and a small section of the old mill leat which used to feed into a small culvert to one side of the old bridge.
