= Caspar Smits =

Dutch Golden Age painter

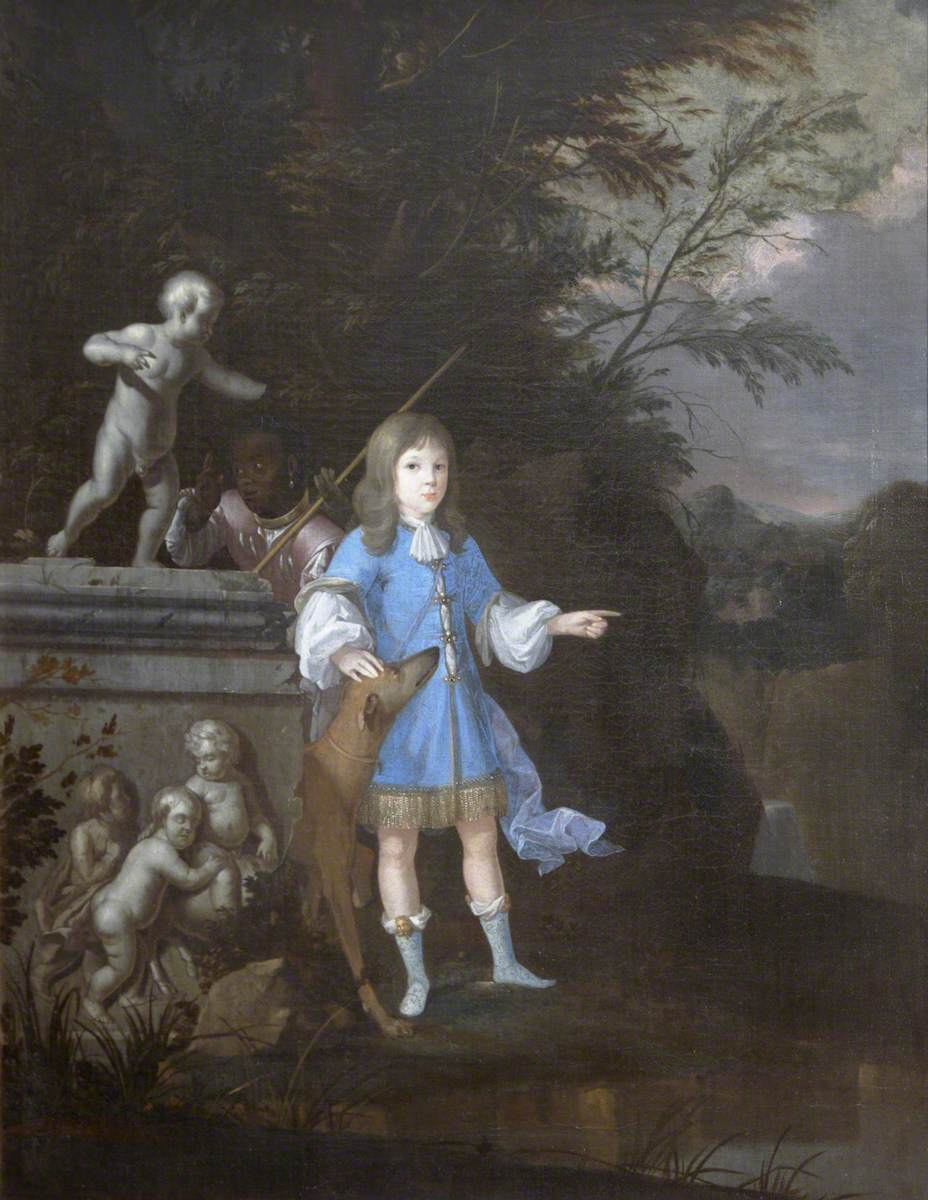
Portrait of a boy, 1680s, probably John Arundell, 3rd Baron Arundell of Trerice, Trerice House

Caspar Smits, also known as Ludowyk Smits or Gaspar Smitz, with the surname sometimes spelt "Smith", and the Latin form "Casparus" sometimes used (1635–probably 1688), was a Dutch Golden Age painter, whose main interest today is that he was one of the first painters of any stature to work in Ireland, where he probably moved in the 1660s and died around 1688. His few surviving attributed works are mostly portraits of the English and Irish gentry and aristocracy, but early sources say he did history paintings and flower paintings as well.

== Biography ==
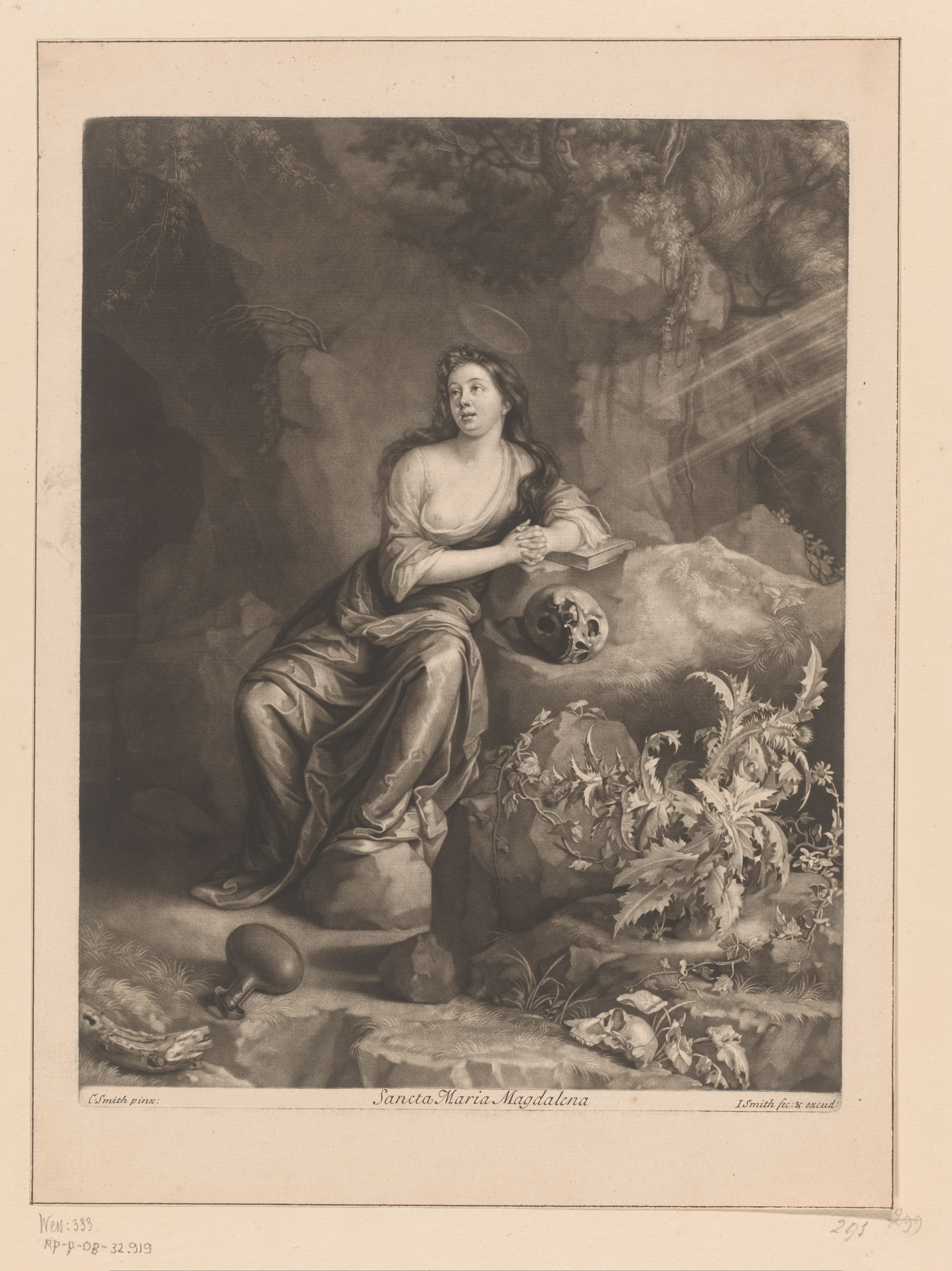
Mezzotint print of the Penitent Magdalen, 1691, by John Smith, after "C. Smits", 340 mm × 262 mm

He was probably born around 1635 in Zwartewaal in the south of Holland. According to Arnold Houbraken he was called Ludowyk Smits, nicknamed Hartkamp, and was the teacher of the painters Simon Germyn and possibly Garret Morphy. Smits came to live in Dordrecht for a few years with the organist Joan Kools, whose wife traded in paintings, when he was 40 in 1675. He started by making "penitent Maria Magdalenes", but made his living primarily by painting fruit and flower still lifes in the manner of Jan Davidsz de Heem and Willem van Aelst. He used cheap paint that faded quickly, and when his customers complained he said that the paint lasted longer than the money that was paid for them.

The leading London mezzotinter John Smith published a Penitent Magdalen in 1691, after "C. Smits", and the Dutch mezzotinter Jacob Gole published a print of a different composition of the same subject. Both have the same model, with a single breast exposed, and a large thistle in the foreground, apparently a trademark motif. The Gould/Walpole/Virtue Dictionary of Artists claims that "an English gentlewoman, of an agreeable person, who passed for his wife, was his model for all the Magdalens he painted".

Various miniature portraits are attributed to him, including one of the three works belonging to the National Trust that are attributed to him.

According to the RKD he was known under the names Lodewyk, Gaspar, and Magdalen Smits, as well as the alias Theodorus Hartkamp. Abraham Bredius found Dordrechtse documents in the archives there to prove that Houbraken's Ludowyk Smits and Horace Walpole's Gaspar Smits were the same person He was a member of the Guild of St. Luke in Dublin from 1681 to 1688, and according to Walpole he was active in Ireland until his death in 1707. However, his final entry, for 1688, in the guild records is annotated mort ("dead") in the margin, and it is thought more likely that he died around then.
