= Fir Hill Manor =

Manor house in Cornwall, England

Coordinates: 50.417°N 4.997°W

- Interactive map of the Fir Hill Manor area

General information
- Location: manor house, England

Fir Hill Manor is a manor house near Colan, mid-Cornwall, England, dating from the 1850s. In 1994, it was the subject of a BBC Bristol documentary, which tells the story of former Newquay policeman Derek Fowkes as he searches for absentee landlord, John Paget Figg-Hoblyn. John Paget Figg-Hoblyn claimed to be the rightful heir to the estate after the death of his father, Francis, who died in 1965. The inheritance was not settled for over 40 years.

== History ==
=== Early years ===
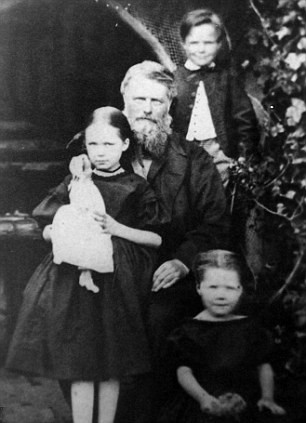
William Paget Hoblyn and three of his children in the 1860s

Fir Hill Manor is situated within the Fir Hill Woods, near Colan (not far from Newquay). The Hoblyns of Fir Hill and Drennick were descended from Robert Hoblyn – whose son married Judith Burgess, the heir and representative of Elizabeth Milliton – and Sir John Langdon Bonython. The dwelling's first owner, William Paget Hoblyn, lived there in 1856 with his wife, one son and four daughters. William wanted his daughters to share in the inheritance of the estate. His son Ernest eventually died young. Only one sister, Rosalind, had children. She married a naval officer, Thomas Richard Figg, in 1884. They moved to Canada, and their children became Figg-Hoblyn. The remaining sisters stayed at the Fir Hill but without help could not manage the upkeep of the estate, so moved off the Estate to St Columb Porth. Rosalind's eldest son, Francis Figg-Hoblyn, wanted to restore Fir Hill Manor, but was not happy with its upkeep and eventually did not settle in England but remained the beneficiary of the landed estate including the manor house. On his death, his son John Paget Figg -Hoblyn became the beneficiary of the Hoblyn Entailed Trust (1879).

=== Inheritance mystery ===
Francis Figg-Hoblyn, owner of the Fir Hill Manor estate, died in 1965. Upon his death he willed the property to his son, John Paget Figg-Hoblyn. However, John Paget Figg-Hoblyn had returned to the United States without making it clear he had accepted the inheritance.

In 1994, Fir Hill Manor was the subject of a BBC Bristol documentary, The Curse of Fir Hill Manor, which told the story of former Newquay policeman Derek Fowkes as he searched for John Paget Figg-Hoblyn. John Paget's cousin, John Westropp Figg-Hoblyn, a septuagenarian ex-farmer from Missouri, USA, and his wife Geraldine, had an idea that John Paget was living in a trailer park in the USA. At that time, the exact address of their residence was still not known.

The manor was valued at £5 million, as of 2007, and had a regular rental income of £88,000 a year from the five farms and six houses of the estate. The High Court was administering the estate through its Official Solicitor. But over the years, due to continued neglect, its status has further deteriorated. In 2007 and 2013 the property was valued at £5 million though it was believed without the long drawn out legal process it could have been worth much more.

Finally, in 2011, the property which belonged to John Paget Figg-Hoblyn, and his father, Francis Figg-Hoblyn, was passed on to their next of kin. Though John Westropp Figg-Hoblyn wanted to live in the manor and develop the estate, another distant cousin, Charles Hoblyn, bought 60 acres (24 ha) of the estate, including the dilapidated Fir Hill Manor. Some of the remaining land has been sold to tenants, and the rest is still up for sale. The Figg-Hoblyn family is retaining one historical cottage on the estate.
