= Trerice =

- Trerys (Cornish)
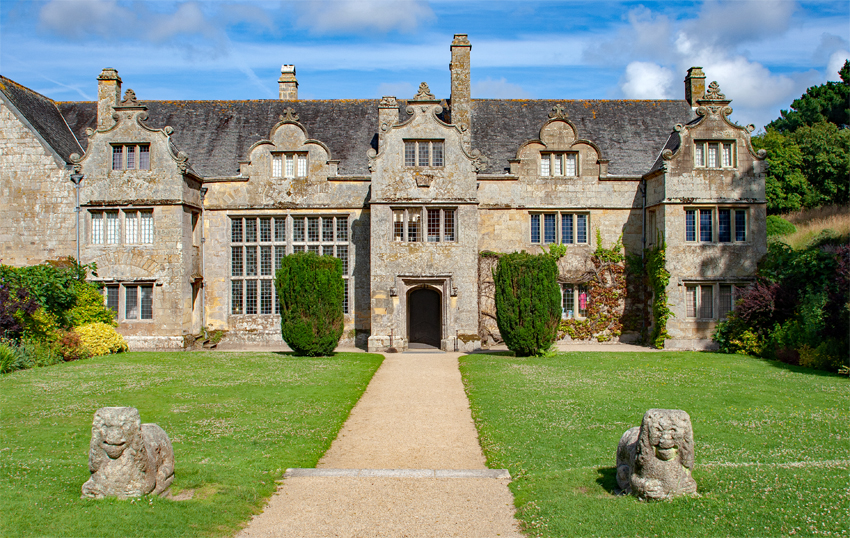
- Trerice House, as rebuilt in 1572 by John Arundell

- Location within Cornwall
- 50°23′12″N 5°02′19″W
- Type: Manor House
- OS grid reference: SW 84115 58478

History
- Built: 15th century
- Rebuilt: 1570–1573

Site notes
- Owner: National Trust

Listed Building – Grade I
- Official name: Trerice
- Designated: 28 February 1952
- Reference no.: 1328731

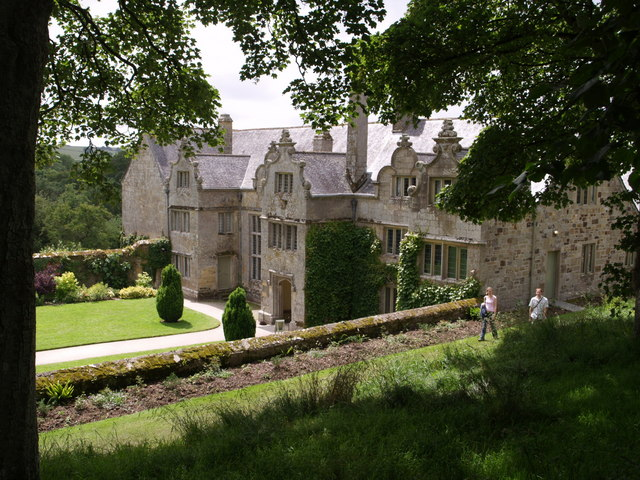
Trerice House

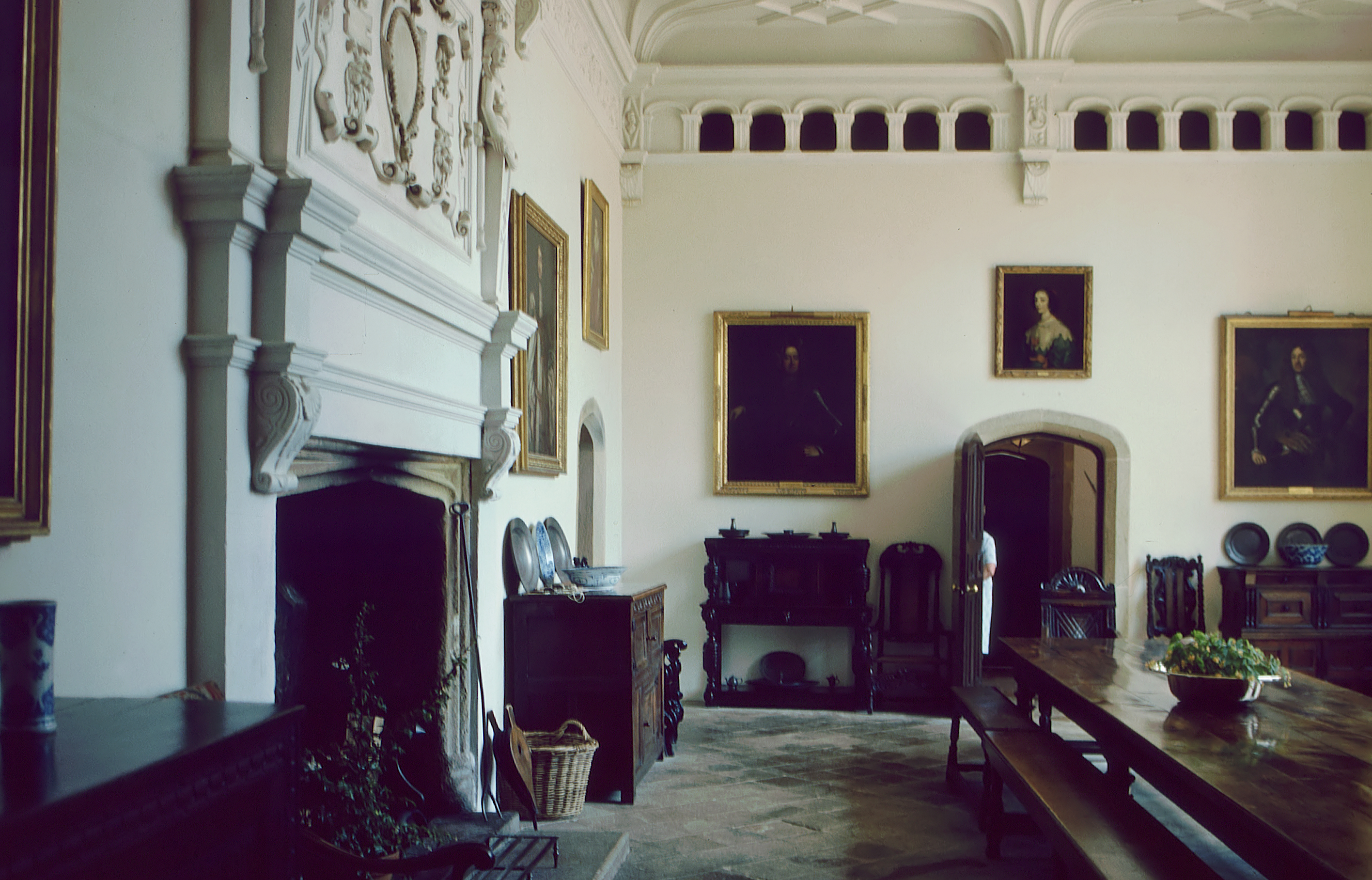
Trerice House, great hall. Above the overmantel at left appears the date "1572", assumed to indicate the date of the house's construction. The small openings high in the far wall are to the minstrels' gallery. The 20 foot long refectory table was made in situ during the Aclands' ownership, of oak from their Holnicote estate in Somerset, and is too large to be removed from the room

Trerice (pronounced Tre-rice) (Cornish: Trerys, meaning ford farmstead) is an historic manor in the parish of Newlyn East (Newlyn in Pydar), near Newquay, Cornwall, United Kingdom. The surviving Tudor manor house known as Trerice House is located at Kestle Mill, three miles east of Newquay (grid reference SW840584). The house with its surrounding garden has been owned by the National Trust since 1953 and is open to the public. The house is a Grade I listed building. The two stone lions on the front lawn are separately listed, Grade II. The garden features an orchard with old varieties of fruit trees.

== Nomenclature ==
The prefix Tre- or Tref- is commonly found in Cornish and Welsh place names, denoting "hamlet, farmstead or estate", and dates from the 7th century Anglo-Saxon settlement of Britain. About 1,300 such place names survive in Cornwall west of the River Tamar, but 3 survive in neighbouring Devon, the next adjoining county beyond the Tamar. A few instances also exist in Glamorgan, on the north side of the Bristol Channel from Cornwall. The prefix is equivalent to Anglo-Saxon suffix -tun or -ton, rare in Cornish speaking areas until the later versio -towe becomes prevalent. The second part of the place name -Rice (compare the name Price 'Son of Rice' from Ap Rhys cf. Welsh Rhys) is the name of the man who held the estate.

== Manor house ==
Trerice House features a main south-east facing range of 'E'-plan abutting a south-west range containing two earlier phases. Phase I consisted of a tower house with low north-west block. This was extended early in the 16th century, probably by 'Jack of Tilbury', to include a 2-storey range to the south-east of the earlier tower, together now forming the bulky south wing. Sir John Arundell, High Sheriff of Cornwall and father-in-law to Sir Richard Carew, historian, added the main range of the E-plan circa 1570–1573.

== History ==
The manor of Trerice was from the 14th century to 1768 the seat of the Arundell family "of Trerice", which appears to have been connected (by unknown means) with the equally prominent Arundell family "of Lanherne", 6 miles to the north-east of Trerice, and of Tolverne in Cornwall and later of Wardour Castle in Wiltshire. Both families used the same armorials. In 1768 on the failure of the male line it passed by entail to the Wentworth family, Earls of Strafford, and on the extinction of that family in 1802 passed by entail to the Acland baronets of Devon and Somerset, who sold it in 1915 to Cornwall County Council.

=== Descent ===
==== de Terise ====
Arms of Lansladron: Sable, three chevronels argent, later quartered by the Arundells of Trerice

The earliest known holder was the de Terise family, which took its surname from the manor, whose descent is recorded in the Heraldic Visitations of Cornwall as follows:.

- Udy de Terise
- Otes de Terise, son, who married Rose Goviley, daughter and heiress of Goviley by his wife Maude de Lansladron, daughter and heiress of Sir Serlo de Lansladron, of Lansladron in Cornwall, who was summoned to parliament as a baron by King Edward I (1272–1307). The Arundell family later quartered the arms of Lansladron: Sable, three chevronels argent.
- Michael (or Matthew) de Terise, son, who married Alice de Flamoke, daughter of Marke, Lord Flamoke, of Flamoke. He left a daughter and sole heiress Jane de Flamoke, who during the reign of King Edward III (1327–1377) married Ralph Arundell of Kierhaies (or Kenelhelvas) ("Carhayes" in Somerset).

==== Arundell ====
Ancient arms of Arundell of trerice: Gules, a lion rampant or,

Modern arms of Arundel of Trerice (and of Arundell of Lanherne & Wardour Castle): Sable, six martlets argent. These are early canting arms, based on the French for swallow hirondelle. They were recorded for Reinfred de Arundel (d. circa 1280), lord of the manor of Lanherne, Cornwall, in the 15th-century Shirley Roll of Arms

The origins of the Arundell family of Trerice are obscure and no reliable descent has been traced from the family of Arundell of Lanherne, Cornwall, 6 miles to the north-east of Trerice, called by Leland "The Great Arundells". These two main Arundell families are easily confused as both called most of the male heirs by the Christian name "John". The earliest recorded English Arundell is the 11th century Norman magnate Roger Arundel, feudal baron of Poorstock in Dorset, recorded in the Domesday Book of 1086, whose family died out in the male line in 1165. No such place as Arundel appears to exist in Normandy, and no territorial prefix de is shown before Roger's surname in Domesday. The early armorials of the Arundells of Trerice were Gules, a lion rampant or, but the family later used the same canting arms as Arundell of Lanherne: Sable, six swallows 3, 2 and 1 argent (derived from the French hirondelle, a swallow). The Arundells of Trerice are said to have had their English origins during the reign of King Henry III (1216–1272) at the manor of "Caryhayes, Carshayes, Kierhaies or Kenelhelvas" in Cornwall, or at Allerford in Somerset. However the Lysons brothers (1814) stated:

"We think it extremely probable, from the frequent recurrence of the family-names of Nicholas and John, that the Arundells of Trerice were descended from a younger son of Sir Nicholas Arundell, of Hempston-Arundell, (i.e. Little Hempston near Totnes) in Devonshire, the elder branch of which failed by the death of his son Sir John, in the reign of Henry III".

The family's descent is recorded in the Heraldic Visitations of Cornwall as follows:.

===== Ralph Arundell =====
Ralph Arundell of Kierhaies (or Kenelhelvas) who during the reign of King Edward III (1327–1377) married Jane de Terise, heiress of Trerice.

===== Nicholas Arundell =====
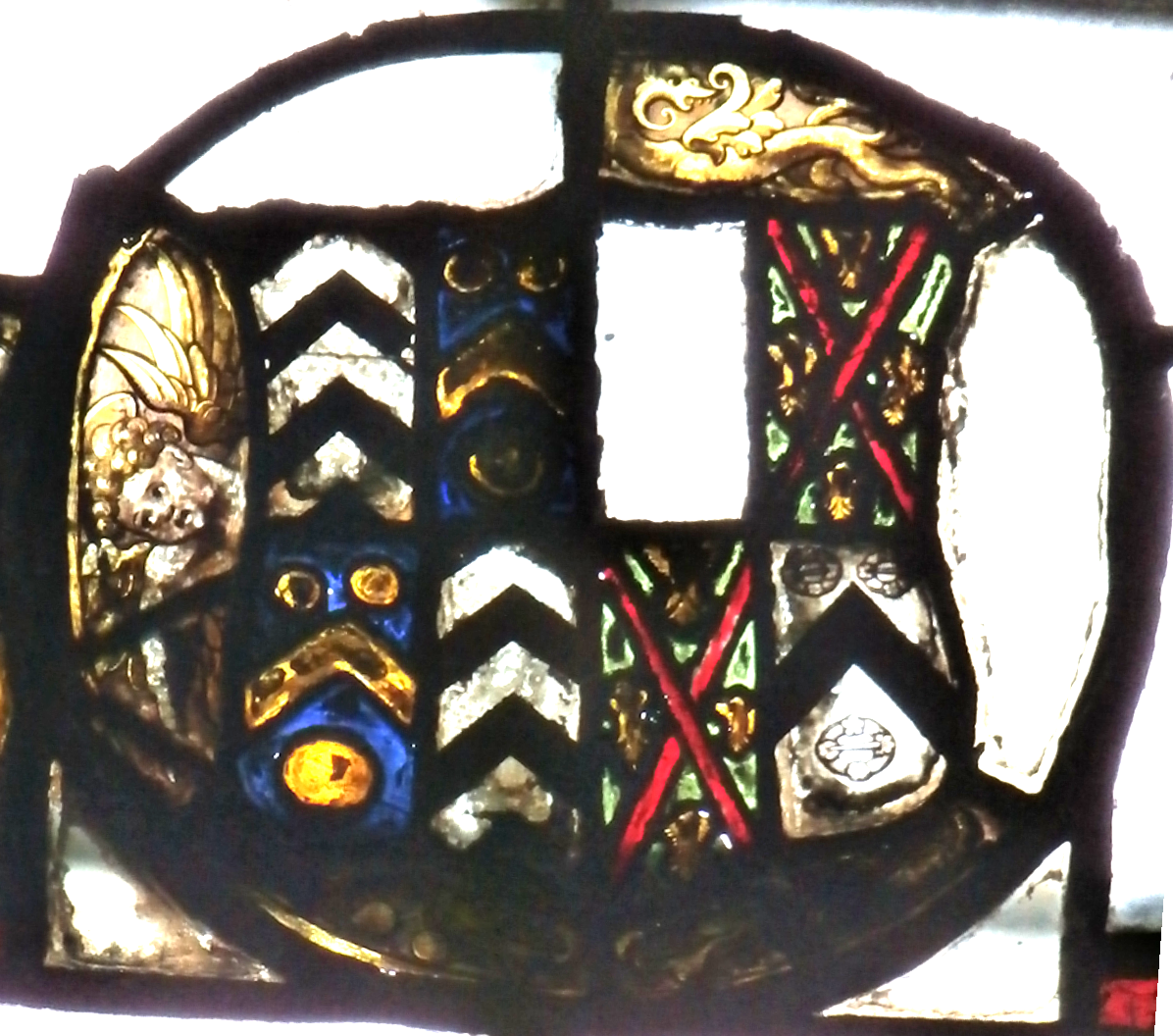
Mediaeval stained glass in All Saints Church, Selworthy, Somerset. The baron side of the impalement shows Lanslasdron quartering Pellor: Azure, a chevron or between three bezants

Nicholas Arundell, son and heir, who married Elizabeth Pellor, daughter and heiress of John Pellor (alias Cheddore) of Pellor

===== Sir John Arundell =====
Sir John Arundell, son and heir, who married Jane Durant, daughter and heiress of John Durant (or Jane Lupus daughter of Lupus of Crantock by his wife a daughter and heiress of Lupus of Durant). His second son was Richard Arundell of Penbigell, Sheriff of Cornwall in 1408.

===== Nicholas Arundell =====
Arms of St John of Fonmon and Bletso: Argent, on a chief gules two mullets or

Nicholas II Arundell, son, who married Johanna St John (died 1482), daughter of Edward St John of Somerset and heiress of her brother William St John (died 1473). From this marriage the Arundells inherited the manors of Selworthy and Luccombe, on the north coast of Somerset opposite Glamorgan where Fonmon Castle was the family's earliest seat, built by Sir Oliver St. John, one of the Twelve Knights of Glamorgan, followers of Robert FitzHamon (died 1107), the Norman conqueror of Glamorgan. The North Somerset estate of Holnicote was in the parish of Selworthy, and had been inherited on the marriage in 1745 of Sir Thomas Dyke Acland, 7th Baronet (1723–1785) to Elizabeth Dyke, heiress of Holnicote, Tetton and Pixton. The Aclands became heirs to the Arundell estates in 1802 (see below). Fragments of stained glass survive in the east window of the north aisle of Selworthy Church showing the arms of Nicholas I Arundell of Trerys, and of his wife Elizabeth Pellor (alias Pellower) (sable, a chevron or between three bezants), grandparents of Nicholas II Arundell who inherited Selworthy, who clearly inserted the glass in memory of his grandparents as he was the first to have a connection with Selworthy. These Pellor arms are also visible on the monumental brass to Sir John IV Arundell (died 1561) in Stratton Church (see image below).

====== Selworthy stained glass ======
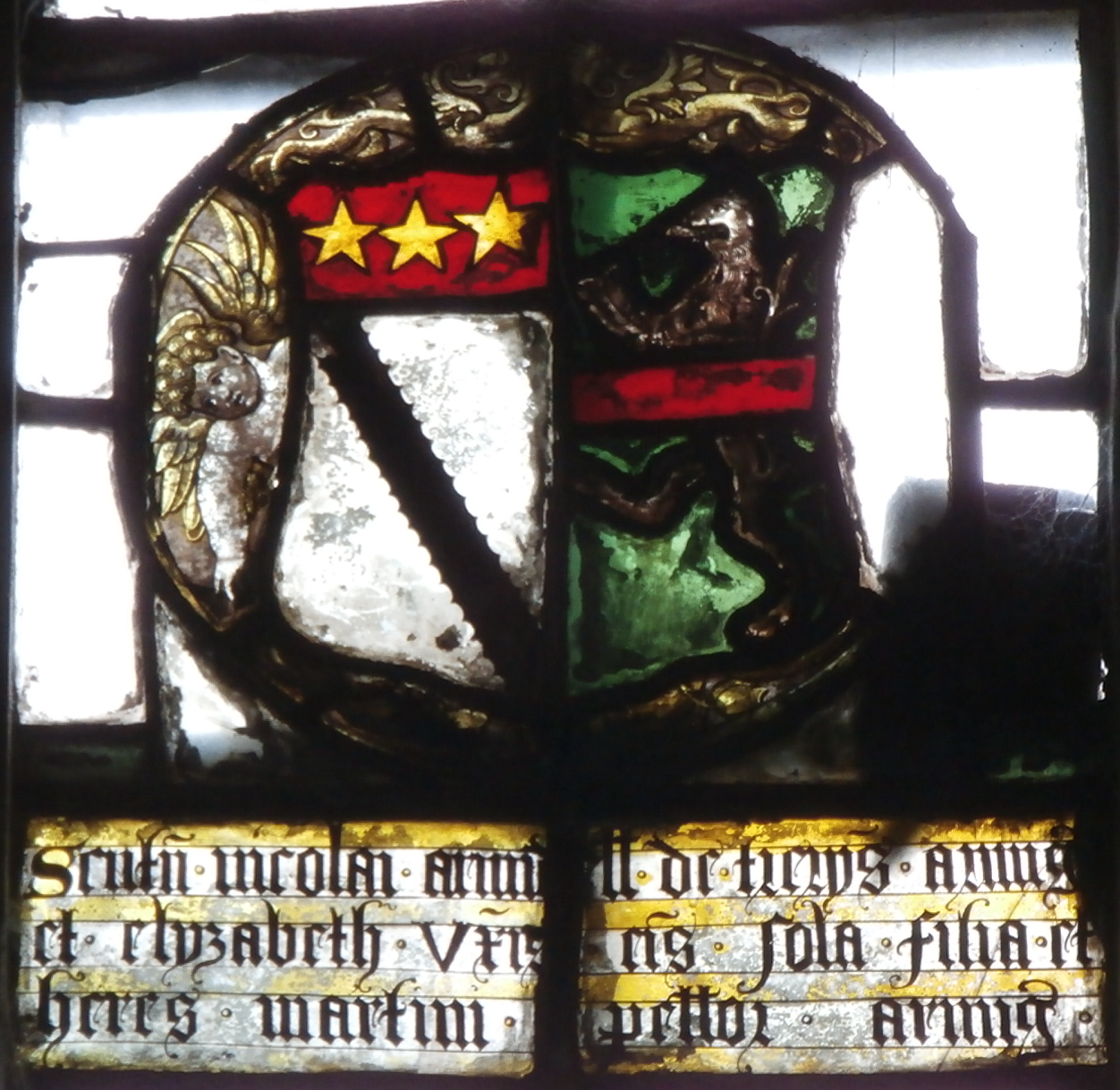
15th century stained glass fragment in east window of north aisle, Selworthy Church, Somerset, showing the arms of St John of Selworthy (Argent, a bend engrailed sable on a chief gules three mullets or) impaling Vert, a lion rampant argent over all a fess gules

A 15th century stained glass fragment survives reset in the east window of the north aisle, Selworthy Church, Somerset, showing the arms of St John of Selworthy (Argent, a bend engrailed sable on a chief gules three mullets or) impaling: Vert, a lion rampant argent over all a fess gules. The shield does not match with the Latin inscription below it: Scutu(m) Nicolai Arundell de Trerys armig(eri) et Elizabeth(ae) ux(o)r(i)s ei(u)s sola filia et heres Martini Peltor armig(eri) ("Shield of Nicholas Arundell of Trerice, Esquire, and of Elizabeth his wife, only daughter and heir of Martin Peltor, Esquire"). These are instead the arms of Edward St John (1394/5-1448/9) and his wife Joan (le Jewe) St John, parents of Joan St John, heiress of Luccombe and Selworthy and wife of Nicholas II Arundell of Trerice.

===== Sir John Arundell (c.1428–1471) =====
Sir John Arundell, son, was the Sheriff of Cornwall until his death in 1471. According to the Cornish historian, Richard Carew in his Survey of Cornwall:

"Being forewarned that he would be slain on the sands, forsook his house at Efford, as too maritime, and removed to Trerice his more inland habitation in the same county; but he did not escape his fate, for being Sheriff of Cornwall in that year, and the Earl of Oxford surprising Mount Michael for the House of Lancaster, he had the king's commands, by his office, to endeavour the reducing of it, and lost his life in a skirmish on the sands thereabouts".

St Michael's Mount had been captured by the Earl of Oxford, and as Sheriff it fell to Arundell to obey the King's command. He was buried in the chapel in St Michael's Mount. He married twice: firstly to Margaret Courtenay, daughter of "Sir Hugh Courtenay", whose identity is unclear, by whom he had two sons Robert and Walter, who died young, without children. he married secondly to Anne Moyle, daughter of Sir Walter Moyle of Estwell, by whom he had children four sons, the eldest two of whom, Robert and Sir John III, succeeded successively to Trerice.

===== Robert Arundell =====
Robert Arundell, eldest son and heir, who married Ellen Southwood.

===== James Arundell (died 1491) =====
James Arundell (died 1491), son, who died without children when his heir became his uncle Sir John Arundell.

===== Sir John Arundell (1470–1512) =====
Sir John Arundell (1470–1512), uncle, second son of Sir John Arundell. He was Sheriff of Cornwall and Vice-Admiral of the West to King Henry VII and to his son King Henry VIII. He married Jane Grenville (died 1552), a daughter of Sir Thomas Grenville (died 1513), lord of the manors of Bideford in Devon and of Stowe in the parish of Kilkhampton in Cornwall, Sheriff of Cornwall in 1481 and in 1486. The Grenville seat of Stowe was situated about 4 miles north of the Arundell secondary seat of Efford/Stratton, Bude. During the Wars of the Roses in his youth Grenville had been a Lancastrian supporter and had taken part in Buckingham's rebellion against Richard III. On the accession of King Henry VII (1485–1509) and the end of the wars, Grenville was appointed one of the Esquires of the Body to that king. Jane Grenville survived her husband and remarried to Sir John Chamond of Launcells, about 1 mile south-east of Stratton. In her will she requested to be buried in Stratton Church, between the bodies of her two husbands. One of Jane Grenville's sisters, Katherine Grenville, married into the Arundell family of Lanherne, namely to Sir John VII Arundell of Lanherne (1474–1545) Knight Banneret, "the most important man in the county", being Receiver-General of the Duchy of Cornwall.

===== Sir John Arundell (1495–1561) =====
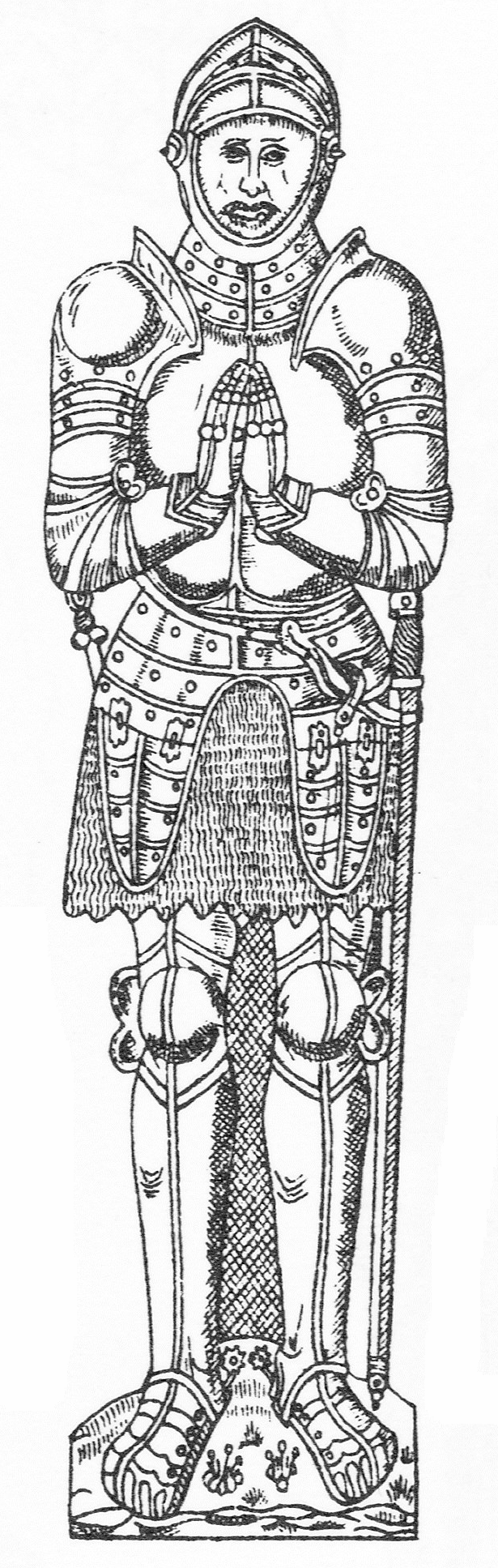
monumental brass of Sir John IV Arundell (1495–1561) Jack of Tilbury, of Trerice. Stratton Church, Cornwall (detail)

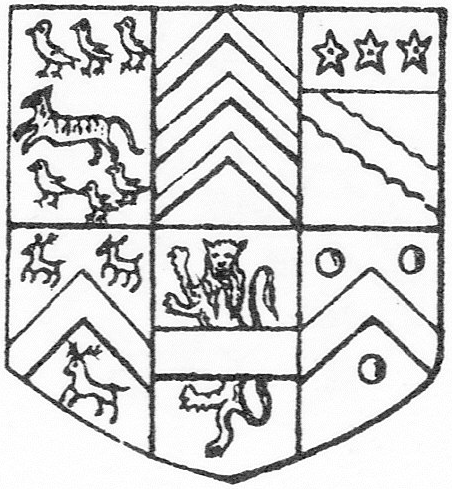
Drawing of arms of Sir John IV Arundell (1495–1561) of Trerice, with six quarters, from his brass in Stratton Church: *1:Sable, a wolf between six swallows argent (Arundell) *2:Sable, three chevronels argent (Lansladron) *3:Argent, a bend engrailed sable on a chief gules three mullets or pierced azure (or?) (St John of Selworthy(?)) *4:Argent, a chevron sable between three bucks gules (?) *5:Azure (Vert?), a lion rampant gardant argent debruised by a fess gules (de Luccombe(?)) *6:Sable (Azure?), a chevron argent (or?) between three bezants (Pellor)

Sir John IV Arundell (1495–1561), eldest son and heir, known as Jack of Tilbury, was an Esquire of the Body to King Henry VIII whom he served as Vice-Admiral of the West. He was knighted at the Battle of the Spurs in 1513. In 1523 he achieved notability by the capture of a notorious pirate. He served twice as Sheriff of Cornwall, in 1532 and in 1541. His monumental brass survives in Stratton Church, Cornwall, the place of his burial, the parish church of his secondary seat at Efford, near Bude. John IV Arundell married twice:

Arundell's Estate Act 1609
- Act of Parliament
- Parliament of England
- Long title: An Act for Confirmation of certain Fines levied by John Arundell of Guarnack, Esquire, to John Aundell of Trerise, Esquire, deceased, and for settling of the Manors, Lands Tenements and Hereditaments comprised in the said Fines, upon John Arundell, Esquire, and his Heirs, Son of the said John Arundell deceased.
- Citation: 7 Jas. 1. c. 16 Pr.
- Territorial extent: England and Wales

Dates
- Royal assent: 23 July 1610
- Commencement: 9 February 1610 (Note: Start of session.)

Status: Current legislation

- Firstly at some time before 1512 to Mary Beville (died 1526), daughter and co-heiress of John Beville of Gwarnick, near Truro in Cornwall, whose sister and co-heiress Matilda Beville married his first cousin Sir Richard VII Grenville (c. 1495 – 1550), lord of the manors of Bideford in Devon and of Stowe, Kilkhampton in Cornwall (near Efford), MP for Cornwall in 1529 and Marshal of Calais 1535–1540. By Mary Beville he had children as follows:
  - Roger Arundell, declared a lunatic, who predeceased his father, having married (during his lunacy) Elizabeth Denham, daughter of Robert Tredenham (alias Denham) of Tredenham, Cornwall. By his wife he had children:
    - John V Arundell (1557–1613), "of Gwarnick", who inherited the Beville estate of Gwarnick from his grandmother. He was an infant in wardship at the death of his grandfather Sir John IV Arundell in 1561, whose right heir he was. However, Sir John IV had previously conveyed a life-interest in most of his property, including Trerice, to his second and eldest surviving son John VI, from his second marriage, the infant's half-uncle. This was the source of a long-running legal dispute. In about 1565 the warder of the infant John V, who had a financial interest in his ward's estate until he reached his majority of 21, reached an agreement with his ward's half-uncle John VI under which the latter surrendered two large manors to his nephew on condition the warder would drop his claims to nullify the life interest in the remaining estates. In 1579, presumably having reached his majority, John V reluctantly confirmed the 1565 agreement made on his behalf, and furthermore agreed that if he should die childless the estates should descend to the children of his uncle John VI. However following his uncle' death in 1580 John V sought to overturn his 1579 agreement, and launched persistent legal suits against his uncle's son (his half-cousin) the four-year-old John VII Arundell (1576–1654) to recover all his grandfather's estates. Finally in 1610 John V obtained a ruling in the Court of Common Pleas permitting him to enter onto all the disputed lands. But his half-cousin John VII Arundell responded vigorously, and obtained a private act of Parliament, Arundell's Estate Act 1609 (7 Jas. 1. c. 16 Pr.), on 26 March 1610 which overturned the court's judgment and reaffirmed the 1579 settlement. Three years later in 1613 John V Arundell of Gwarnick died, without children, and was buried in Lambeth Church, Surrey, when the estates reverted to Sir John VII Arundell (1576–1654). However, in his will John V bequeathed his claims to his grandfather's estates to two kinsmen, Richard II Prideaux (died 1617) of Thuborough, Devon and his son Jonathan Prideaux (died 1637), who later resumed the legal battle.
  - Katherine Arundell, heir to her nephew John V Arundell (1557–1613) of Gwarnick. She married Richard I Prideaux (died 1603) of Thuborough in the parish of Sutcombe, Devon.
  - Jane Arundell, wife of William Wall
- Secondly in 1526 to Juliana Erissey, daughter of James Erissey of Erissey and widow of a certain Gourlyn, by whom he had children including:
  - John VI Arundell (died 1580) of Trerice.

===== John Arundell (died 1580) =====
John Arundell (died 1580) of Trerice, eldest son by his father's second marriage, a Member of Parliament for Mitchell, Cornwall, in 1555 and 1558, and was High Sheriff of Cornwall in 1573–1574. Although his tenure of the Arundell estates was not fully secure due to the ongoing legal dispute with his half-nephew John V Arundell (died 1613) of Gwarnick, he built the present mansion house at Trerice in about 1572, which date appears above the plaster strapwork overmantel in the great hall. He married twice:

- Firstly to Catherine Cosowarth, daughter of John Cosowarth and widow of Alan Hill, by whom he had children four daughters:
  - Juliana Arundell (born 1563), who married Richard Carew (1555–1620), the historian of Cornwall, author of the Survey of Cornwall.
  - Alice Arundell (born 1564), wife of Henry Somaster (d.1606) of Painsford in the parish of Ashprington, Devon.
  - Dorothy Arundell (born 1566), wife of Edward Coswarth of Coswarth.
  - Mary Arundell (born 1568), wife of Oliver Dynham.
- Secondly he married Gertrude Denys, a daughter of Sir Robert Denys (died 1592) of Holcombe Burnell in Devon, by his first wife Mary Mountjoy (a first cousin to Lady Jane Grey), a daughter of William Blount, 4th Baron Mountjoy (1478–1534), by his fourth wife Dorothy Grey, daughter of Thomas Grey, 1st Marquess of Dorset. Gertrude survived her husband and remarried to Edward, Lord Morley. By Gertrude he had at least eight children including:
  - Sir John VII Arundell (1576 – c. 1656), eldest son and heir, of Trerice, nicknamed "Jack-for-the-King", MP for Cornwall and for Tregony and Governor of Pendennis Castle, Falmouth, during the Civil War
  - Thomas Arundell of Duloe, MP for West Looe, a soldier who served in the Netherlands.
  - Ann Arundell, wife of William Carnsew of Buckelly.
  - Catherine Arundell, wife of John St Aubin of Clowans.

===== Sir John Arundell (1576–1654) =====
Sir John Arundell (1576–1654), eldest son and heir, of Trerice, nicknamed "Jack-for-the-King", MP for Cornwall and for Tregony. He was an infant aged four on his father's death, and became a ward of the crown, which wardship was purchased by family trustees, including his brother-in-law Richard Carew. He inherited from his father the newly rebuilt mansion house at Trerice with over 2,000 acres in Cornwall, Devon, Somerset and Dorset, with a reversionary interest in a further 3,050 acres, dependent on the death of his half-cousin John V Arundell (died 1613) of Gwarnick. Following the death of the latter, he sought to obtain possession of his estates, including the former Beville seat of Gwarnick, then claimed by the Prideaux family. In 1615 he obtained a Chancery decree under which he agreed to pay the Prideauxs £550 to abandon their claims. However Richard II Prideaux (died 1617) refused to comply with the verdict and was sent to the Fleet Prison, where he probably remained until his death two years later. The 1615 agreement was finally implemented in 1622. In 1637 he finally extinguished the Prideaux claim by paying £80 to Sir Richard Prideaux (died 1667), MP, the son and heir of Jonathan Prideaux (died 1637), MP, son of Richard II Prideaux.

He was a Royalist during the First English Civil War, during which he was Governor of Pendennis Castle, Falmouth, which he held during a five-month-long siege in 1646 by Parliamentarian forces, at the end of which his forces were reduced by hunger to eating their horses. He obtained an honourable surrender, but in 1651 compounded for delinquency in the sum of £10,000, later reduced to £2,000. He married Mary Cary, a daughter of George I Cary (1543–1601) of Clovelly, Devon, Sheriff of Devon in 1587, who constructed the harbour wall at Clovelly. By Mary Cary he had children including:

- Colonel John Arundell, (1613–1644) killed in the Siege of Plymouth;
- Richard Arundell, 1st Baron Arundell of Trerice (1616–1687), 2nd son. Before his elevation to the peerage he served twice as MP for Lostwithiel, April 1640 and November 1640 to January 1644, and twice for Bere Alston, 1660 and 1662–1665.
- William Arundel (1620–1643); died of disease in Bristol;
- Nicholas Arundell (1623–1666), of Gwarnick, 5th but second surviving son, MP for Truro 1661 to 1666. The old Beville seat of Gwarnick inherited on the first marriage of his great-grandfather "Jack of Tilbury" was situated 3 miles north-west of Truro.

===== John Arundell, 2nd Baron Arundell (1649–1698) =====
John Arundell, 2nd Baron Arundell of Trerice (1649–1698), son of the 1st Baron by his wife Gertrude Bagge, daughter of Sir James Bagge, of Saltram, Devon, and widow of Sir Nicholas Slanning. Following the death of his uncle Nicholas Arundell in 1666 he succeeded him as MP for Truro, and was elected for that seat again in 1685. He succeeded his father in the barony in 1687. He married twice:

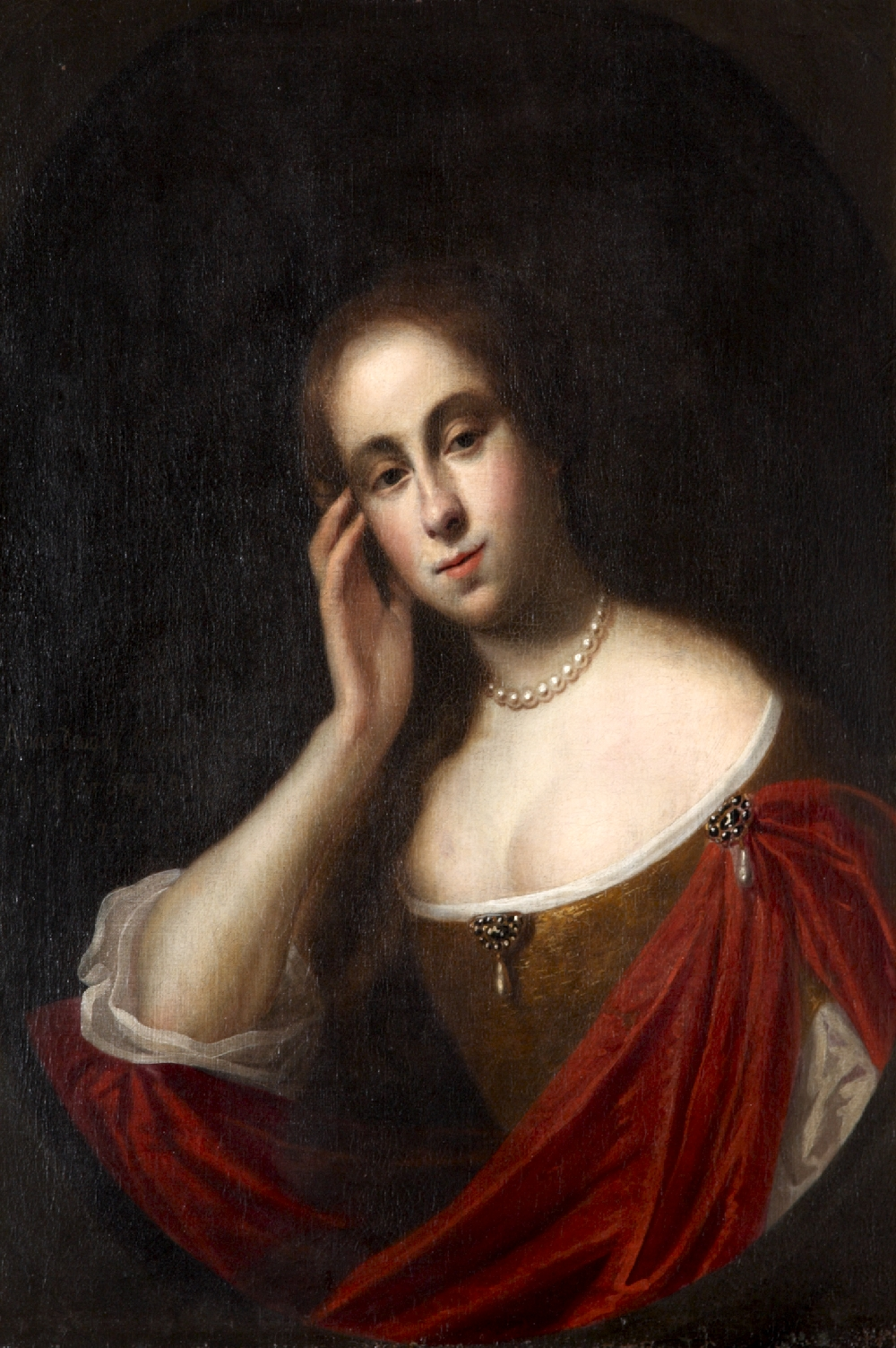
Margaret Acland (died 1691), 1st wife of John Arundell, 2nd Baron Arundell (1649–1698), who although she produced no children, was the connection which ultimately brought Trerice to the Acland family. Portrait circa 1675, British (English) School. Collection of National Trust, Trerice House

- Firstly to Margaret Acland (died 1691), daughter of Sir John Acland, 3rd Baronet (died 1655), of Columb John, Devon, by his wife Margaret Rolle, a daughter of Denys Rolle (1614–1638) of Bicton and Stevenstone in Devon, Sheriff of Devon in 1636. The marriage was without children, but the connection eventually brought Trerice to the Acland family. Her portrait circa 1675 is now owned by the National Trust and is on display in Trerice House. Her inscribed mural monument, topped by a white marble portrait bust, survives in Newlyn Church.
- Secondly to Barbara Slingsby, daughter of Sir Thomas Slingsby, 2nd Baronet, of Scriven, Yorkshire and widow of Sir Richard Mauleverer, 4th Baronet, of Allerton Mauleverer, Yorkshire. She survived her husband and remarried to Thomas Herbert, 8th Earl of Pembroke (c. 1656 – 1733). By Barbara he had children as follows:
  - John Arundell, 3rd Baron Arundell (1678–1706), eldest son and heir.
  - Richard Arundell (died 1758), 2nd son, MP for Knaresborough, Clerk of the Pipe, Surveyor of the Works and Master of the Mint. He married Lady Frances Manners, a daughter of John Manners, 2nd Duke of Rutland, KG, (1676–1721), but died without children.
  - Gertrude Arundell, who was bequeathed by her father a fortune of £6,000. She was wife firstly of Sir Peter Whitcomb of Essex, secondly of Sir Bennett Hoskins.

===== John Arundell, 3rd Baron Arundell of Trerice (1678–1706) =====
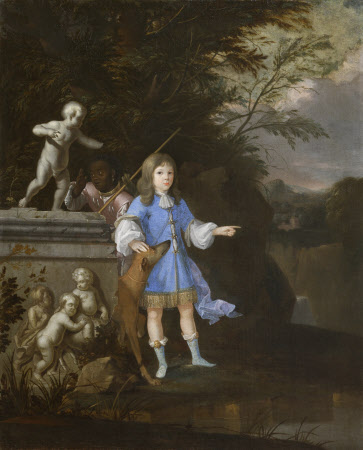
Portrait of a Boy, painted circa 1680s, possibly of John Arundell, 3rd Baron Arundell of Trerice (1678–1706). By Gaspar Smitz (1635–1707), National Trust, Trerice House

John Arundell, 3rd Baron Arundell of Trerice (1678–1706), eldest son and heir. He married Elizabeth Beaw, daughter of William Beaw, Bishop of Llandaff (died 1706).

===== John Arundell, 4th Baron Arundell of Trerice (1701–1768) =====
John Arundell, 4th Baron Arundell of Trerice (1701–1768), son. He married Elizabeth Wentworth (died 1750), daughter of Sir William Wentworth of Ashby, Lincolnshire, and sister of Thomas Wentworth, 1st Earl of Strafford (1672–1739). She was buried in Sturminster Marshall Church in Dorset, in the chancel of which survives her ledger stone with armorials. The marriage was without children and on his death in 1768 the Barony of Arundell became extinct.

==== Wentworth ====
In his marriage settlement the 4th Baron Arundell had settled Trerice and his other estates including Efford and Bude in Cornwall, and Selworthy and Luccombe in Somerset, in default of his own issue, on his wife's nephew, William Wentworth (died 1776), a gentleman usher of the privy chamber to Augusta, Princess of Wales, son of Elizabeth's other brother Peter Wentworth of Henbury, Dorset, and in default of his issue with remainder to Sir Thomas Dyke Acland, 7th Baronet (1723–1785)) and his heirs. William Wentworth duly succeeded to the estates under the settlement, and by his will dated 1775 resettled the estates on his own son Frederick Wentworth, 3rd Earl of Strafford (1732–1799), with remainder on failure of his issue, to the 3rd Earl's sister Augusta Anne Wentworth (died 1802), wife of John Hatfeild Kaye (1731–1804) of Hatfeild Hall, Stanley, West Yorkshire, and on failure of issue from both, (which was the event) to Sir Thomas Dyke Acland, 7th Baronet (1723–1785) and his issue. Following the death of Augusta Anne Kaye in 1802 without issue, Trerice and the other former Arundell estates passed to Sir Thomas Dyke Acland, 10th Baronet (1787–1871), grandson of the 7th Baronet.

In December 1784, Frederick Thomas Wentworth and his mother Susanna Wentworth became the first of several generations of absentee landlords of Trerice as the Manor house and home farm were leased to tenants. The first lessee was Mark Symons, a landholder of East Newlyn, the lease being for 21 years at £240 per annum beginning in September 1784. After Symons's death in 1789, the lease devolved to his son Samuel Symons (1769-1820) until its expiration in 1805.

The descendants of Mark and Samuel Symons have included the noted Victorian and Edwardian artist and designer William Christian Symons Mark Lancelot Symons, who an artist of religious and symbolic subjects, and Arthur Symons the distinguished poet, critic, editor and man of letters. Other notables were R.D. Symons who emigrated to Canada at age 16 where he became an author, rancher, game warden, naturalist, and painter of wildlife and Dom Thomas Symons who was a composer, choirmaster, translator, and teacher. Major General Sir Thomas-Henry Symons was the Director General of the Indian Medical Service from 1926– 1930, . and Charles Symons, was the Chaplain general to the Forces during World War II and Honorary Chaplain to the King.

In the late 1820s, Samuel Symons (1779-1854), a nephew of Mark Symons, and timber merchant and land agent of Wadebridge, built Doyden Castle, a truncated Gothic tower on Doyden Point near Port Quin to entertain his friends. Symons family descendants are still landholders in Cornwall, as for example of Trevathan Farm in St. Endellion, continuously worked by the family since 1857.

==== Acland ====
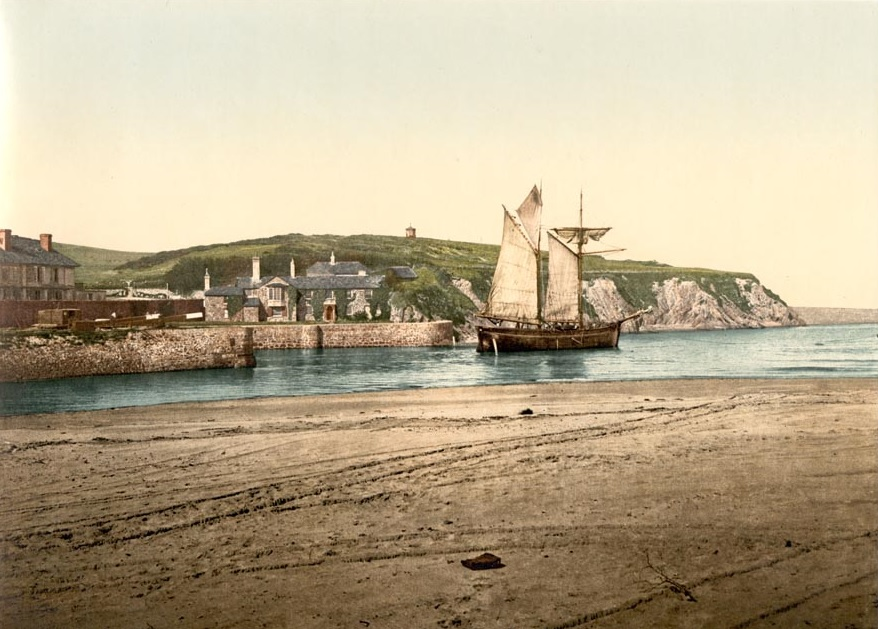
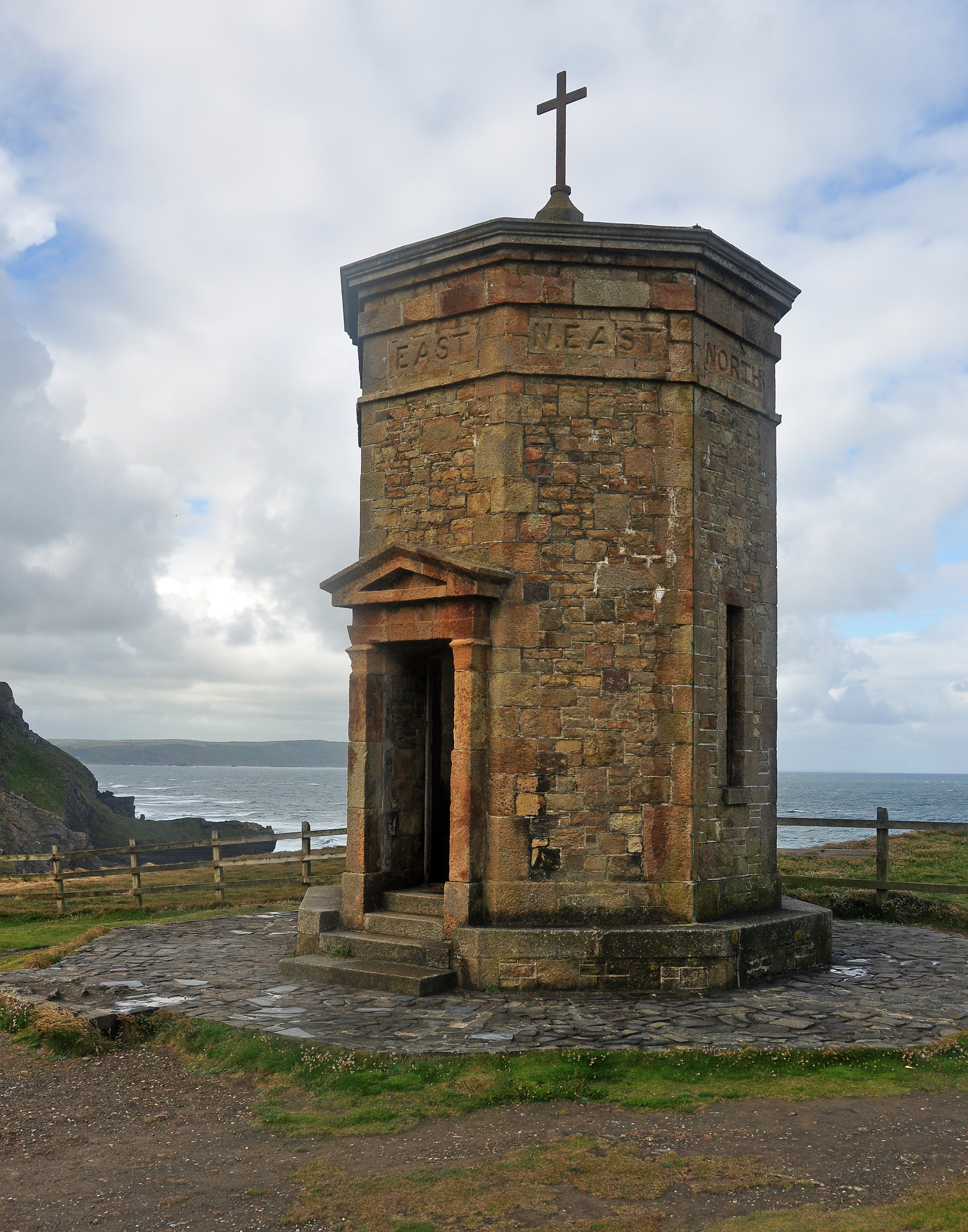
Left: Compass Point, Bude, with Efford Cottage in the foreground, built as a holiday home by the Acland Baronets, with the "Storm Tower" on Efford Down behind. Right: "Storm Tower", whose eight sides face the cardinal and sub-cardinal points of the compass, also built in 1835 by the 10th baronet

In 1802, Trerice and other estates including Ebbingford Manor (Efford) in Stratton, near Bude in Cornwall, and Selworthy and Luccombe in Somerset, passed to Sir Thomas Dyke Acland, 10th Baronet (1787–1871), of Killerton in Devon and Holnicote in Somerset. He invested heavily at Bude by building the St Michael and All Angels Church, a breakwater in the harbour and partly financing the Bude Canal, which passed through the Arundell estates, and in 1823 built "a fisherman's cottage" holiday home known today as "Efford Cottage", situated on the bank of the River Neet at its estuary. Above it is Efford Down, on which in 1835 the 10th Baronet built the surviving octagonal tower known as the "Storm Tower", whose sides face the cardinal and sub-cardinal points of the compass. It was designed by George Wightwick, inspired by the Tower of the Winds in Athens, and is believed to have served as a refuge for coastguards. In 1826 the 10th Baronet also built at Bude the "Falcon Hotel", named after the Acland crest of a falcon perched on a man's gloved hand. The Cornish estates were however difficult to manage economically as they were so far from Killerton, near Exeter. Shortly before 1844 the 10th Baronet restored the Great Hall and the Chamber at Trerice and in 1844 the local newspaper reported, "Sir T. D. Acland held his Baronial Court at Trerice ... about 150 of his tenantry dined with the worthy Baronet in the noble Hall at Trerice, which has recently been restored to its original condition, and is a very fine specimen of the Elizabethan age." The Aclands later leased Trerice with 500 acres to the Tremaine family, who farmed the estate with a staff of twelve men, four women and four boys. In 1915 Trerice was sold by the 10th baronet's grandson Sir Thomas Dyke Acland, 12th Baronet (1842–1919) to Cornwall County Council.

==== Cornwall County Council ====
After the First World War the new owner, Cornwall County Council, split the estate into twelve separate farms, which were either leased to farmers or sold off, leaving the house with only 20 acres of surrounding grounds.

Flag flown at Trerice during The Choughs' exercises in 1940.

In the summer of 1940, the Newquay unit of the Cornwall Home Guard (nicknamed "The Choughs") held drills on the parade ground of the estate.

==== National Trust ====
In 1953 Trerice House and 20 acres of grounds was purchased by the National Trust for £14,000, when the house was in a dilapidated condition.

===== John Elton (died 1980) =====
John Elton (died 1980), the previous tenant since 1944, who had been an East India merchant, obtained a new 200-year lease in 1953, for one shilling a year, but on the condition that he would invest his personal funds in restoring the house. Elton restored the house, which included rebuilding the partially demolished north wing, but spent about £60,000, three times more than expected. Elton left Trerice in 1965 following the death of his wife, and subsequently built a bungalow called Fairlie Lodge, in Shackleford, Surrey. Following his death in 1980 the bungalow was sold. It was noted at the time that it was "furnished with amazing antiques."

== Sources ==
- Crosette, JW (1983). ARUNDELL, Nicholas (1623-66), of Gwarnicke, St. Allen, Cornw.. in The History of Parliament: the House of Commons 1660-1690. Boydell & Brewer.
- Pedigree of Arundell of Trerice, Vivian, J. L., ed. (1887). The Visitations of Cornwall: comprising the Heralds' Visitations of 1530, 1573 & 1620; with additions by J. L. Vivian. Exeter: W. Pollard, p. 11 et seq.
- Lysons, Daniel & Samuel, Magna Britannia, Vol.3, Cornwall, London, 1814.
