= Tregurrian =

Hamlet in Cornwall, England

Coordinates: 50°27′N 5°2′W

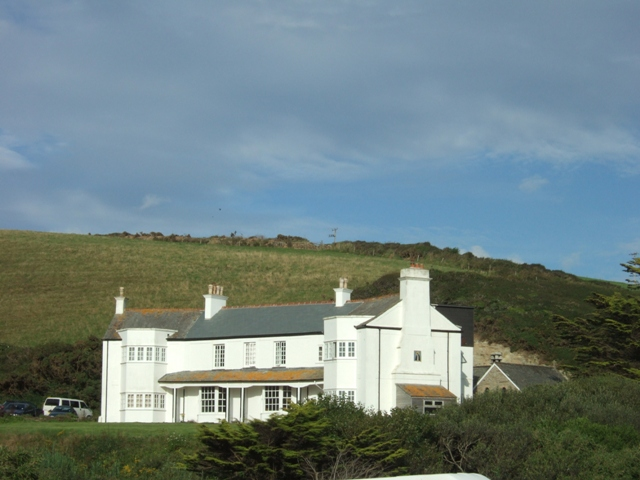
The White House, Tregurrian

Tregurrian (Cornish: Tregoryan, meaning Coryan's farm) is a hamlet 2 miles north-northeast of Newquay, on the north coast of Cornwall, England, United Kingdom.

The beach at Watergate Bay was formerly known as Tregurrian beach.

== Cornish wrestling ==
Cornish wrestling tournaments, for prizes, have been held in Tregurrian in the 1900s.
