= Chapel, Cornwall =

Coordinates: 50.406°N 5.039°W

Chapel: Cornish: Chapelkernhwili
- Location within Cornwall
- OS grid reference: SW841607
- Civil parish: Newquay
- Unitary authority: Cornwall
- Ceremonial county: Cornwall
- Region: South West
- Country: England
- Sovereign state: United Kingdom
- Post town: NEWQUAY
- Postcode district: TR8
- Dialling code: 01637
- Police: Devon and Cornwall
- Fire: Cornwall
- Ambulance: South Western
- UK Parliament: St Austell and Newquay

Chapel (Cornish: Chapelkernhwili, meaning chapel of lapwings) is a hamlet in Cornwall, England. Chapel is situated 2 miles (3.2 km) east of Newquay.
