= Trebarber =

Hamlet in Cornwall, England

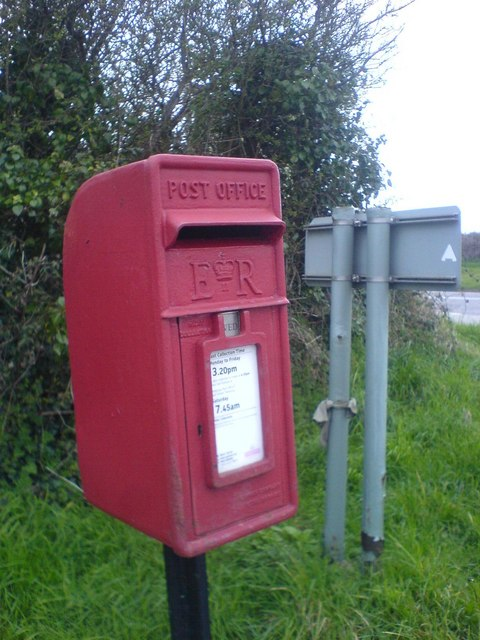
Trebarber post box

Trebarber or Trebarver is a hamlet situated off the A3059, just south of RAF St Mawgan in Cornwall, England, United Kingdom.
