= Quintrell Downs =

Village in Cornwall, England, United Kingdom

Coordinates: 50.4019°N 5.0262°W

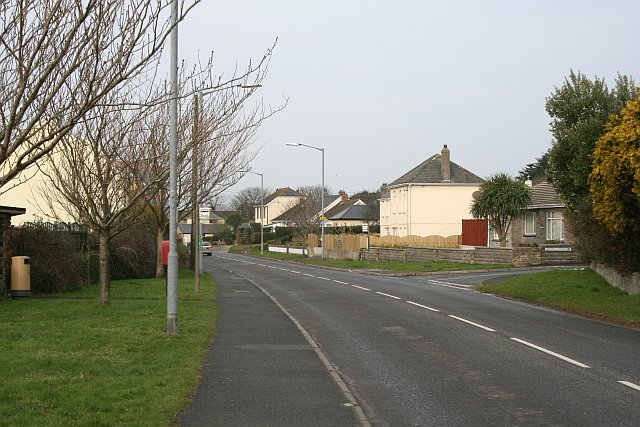
Quintrell Downs

Quintrell Downs is a village in Cornwall, England, United Kingdom, close to Newquay, at the junction of the A392 and A3058 roads. It is named after the surrounding area of moorland.

The village is served by Quintrell Downs railway station.

The name 'Quintrell' comes from the French meaning fop or dandy and back 600 years. The 'Downs' is the area to the south of what is the Two Clomes Inn - this area was called the common. The village is surround three farms - Trethiggey, Trewollack and Bejowan and all of these can be traced back at least 200 years.

The village had a growth period in the 1930s, houses appearing above the railway line on the way to Newquay and also from the chapel eastwards. In the late 1940s buildings were restricted for want of materials, growth started but was very slow.

== Cornish wrestling ==
Cornish wrestling tournaments for prizes were held in a field close by the Union Hotel.
