= Paynter =

Paynter is a surname. It can either be of Cornish origin, meaning "the head/end of the land" (penn an tir) from the Cornish language, or it can be of English-language origin, where it is occupational and refers to a painter. It may refer to:

- Billy Paynter (born 1984), British football player
- Charlie Paynter (1879–1971), British football manager
- David Paynter (artist) (1900–1975), Sri Lankan artist
- Eddie Paynter (1901–1979), British cricketer
- Henry Paynter (1923–2002), American scientist
- Hilary Paynter (born 1943), British artist
- Julian Paynter (born 1970), Australian athlete
- James Paynter (1666–?), leader of a Jacobite uprising
- John Paynter (disambiguation), multiple people
- Kent Paynter (born 1965), Canadian ice hockey player
- Lemuel Paynter (1788–1863), American politician
- Noel Stephen Paynter (1898–1998), British air commodore
- Michael Paynter (born 1986), Australian singer-songwriter
- Mick Paynter (born 1948), British writer
- Randy Paynter (born 1963), American businessman
- Raymond Andrew Paynter, Jr., American ornithologist
- Robert Paynter (1928–2010), British cinematographer
- Samuel Paynter (1768–1845), American politician
- Susan Paynter (born 1945), American journalist
- Thomas H. Paynter (1851–1921), American politician
- Will Paynter (1903–1984), British union leader
- William Paynter (academic) (1637–1716), British priest
- William Henry Paynter (1901–1976), British historian

== See also ==
- Paynter (horse), Thoroughbred racehorse
- Painter (surname)
