= Painter (surname) =

Painter is a surname. Notable people with the surname include:

- Andrew Painter (disambiguation)
- Curtis Painter (born 1985), American footballer
- David Painter (disambiguation)
- Erle V. Painter, (1881–1968), American chiropractic, athletic trainer of the New York Yankees
- Gamaliel Painter (1742–1819), American politician
- George Painter (1914–2005), British author and biographer of Marcel Proust
- Hettie Kersey Painter (1821–1889), American physician and nurse
- Ian Painter (born 1964), English footballer
- J. M. Painter, 19th-century surveyor in South Australia, after whom Mount Painter is named
- Joe Painter (born 1965), British geographer & academic
- Joseph C. Painter (1840 – 1911), American politician
- John Painter (cricketer) (1856–1900), English cricketer
- John Painter (supercentenarian) (1888–2001), American soldier & long survivor
- John Mark Painter (born 1967), American musician
- Jon Painter, American politician
- Kenneth Painter (1935–2016), British archaeologist
- Kevin Painter (born 1967), British darts player
- Kristin Painter, American novelist
- Lance Painter (born 1967), British baseball coach
- Marcos Painter (born 1986), English footballer
- Matt Painter (born 1970), American basketball coach
- Oskar Painter, Canadian physicist
- Patrick Paniter or Painter (c.1470–1519), Scottish courtier
- Patrick Painter (born 1954), American art dealer
- Reece Painter, American politician
- Robbie Painter (born 1971), English footballer
- Roy Painter (born c. 1930), British politician
- Shankar Painter (1946–2020), Indian poet
- Sidney Painter (1902–1960), American medievalist
- Stetson Painter, Member of the Arkansas House of Representatives
- Temple Painter (1933–2016), American harpsichordist and organist
- Theophilus Painter (1889–1969), American zoologist
- Uriah Hunt Painter (1837–1900), American journalist
- William Hunt Painter (1835–1910), English botanist
- William Painter (author) (c. 1540–1594), English author
- William Painter (inventor) (1838–1906), American
