= John Painter =

John Painter may refer to:

- John Painter (supercentenarian) (1888–2001), world's oldest man between November 1999 and March 2001
- John Mark Painter (born 1967), American musician
- John Painter (cellist) (1932–2025), Australian musician
- John Painter (theologian) (born 1935), Australian scholar
- John Painter (cricketer) (1856–1900), English cricketer
- John Hunt Painter (1819–1891), Quaker farmer who sent John Brown the firearms used in the raid on Harpers Ferry

== See also ==
- John Paynter (disambiguation)
- John Payntor (died 1540), English MP
- John the Painter (1752–1777), executed for the crime of arson in royal dockyards
- Jon Painter, American politician
