= Trelissick Manor =

Manor house in Cornwall, England

- Location within Cornwall
- 50.173°N 5.424°W
- Location: St Erth, Cornwall, England

History
- Built: Middle Ages
- Rebuilt: 1668

Listed Building – Grade II*
- Official name: Trelissick Manor House, Farmhouse and Cottage, including front and rear garden wall, summer house, gate piers and gate
- Designated: 14 January 1988
- Reference no.: 1327629

Trelissick Manor is a listed manor house in the parish of St Erth, Cornwall, England. It was the seat of the armigerous family of Camborn[e] alias Paynter, who were also seated at Antron in Sithney and Deverell in Gwinear.

== History and description ==
It was the birthplace of the academic William Paynter, who was Vice-Chancellor of Oxford University in 1698 and 1699. A nephew of William was James Paynter, who in 1715 took an active part in proclaiming James Francis Edward Stuart (the Old Pretender) on the death of Queen Anne. James was given the title Marquess of Trelissick (also called the Marquisate of Trelessick) on 20 June 1715.

The medieval house was remodelled for James Paynter in 1688 and again in the 18th century. It was extended in the 19th century. The house has an L-shaped plan and part of the front range is taller. The associated farm buildings date from the 17th, 18th and 19th centuries.

== See also ==
- Marquess of Trelissick
