= Jacobite rising =

Jacobite rising may refer to:

- Jacobite rising of 1689
- Jacobite rising of 1715
  - Jacobite uprising in Cornwall of 1715
- Jacobite rising of 1719
- Jacobite rising of 1745

== See also ==
- Jacobitism
