= David Paynter =

David Paynter may refer to:

- David Paynter (cricketer) (born 1981), English cricketer
- David Paynter (artist) (1900–1975), Sri Lankan artist
- David Paynter, High Sheriff of Pembrokeshire
- David William Paynter (1791–1823), English author
- David William Paynter (born 1968), Australian, General Manager / Specialist in Supply Chain Operations

== See also ==
- David Painter (disambiguation)
- David Panter (died 1558), Scottish diplomat, clerk and bishop of Ross
