= Marquess of Trelissick =

Marquessate of Trelissick
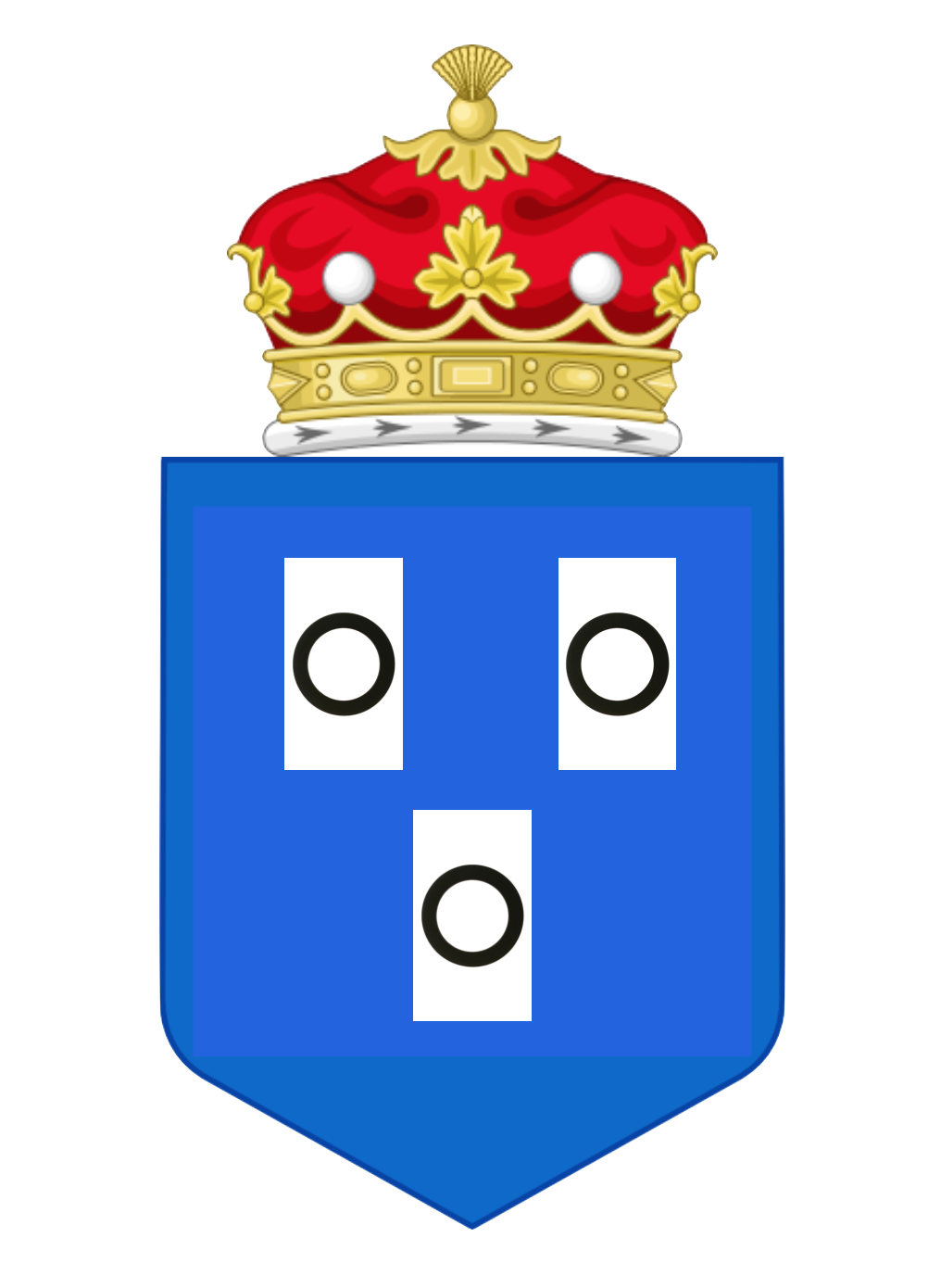
- Arms of Paynter of Boskenna, Cornwall: Azure, three billets argent each charged with an annulet sable
- Creation date: 20 June 1715
- Created by: James Francis Edward Stuart ("The Old Pretender")
- Peerage: Jacobite Peerage
- First holder: James Paynter, Marquess of Trelissick
- Present holder: Graham Stephen West Esq, Jacobite Marquess of Trelissick
- Heir apparent: William James Dalrymple Fanshawe Bedding West, Lord
- Remainder to: Heirs-general lawfully begotten
- Seat: Loch Ryan House
- Former seats: Ancestral seats of the Camborne Alias Paynter / Paynter line : Deverell, Gwinear, Cornwall; Antron, Sithney, Cornwall; Trelissick Manor, St Erth, Cornwall; Trelissick Barton, St Erth, Cornwall; Boskenna Estate, Cornwall; Trekenning, St Columb, Cornwall; Camborne House, Richmond, Surrey; Eaton Grange; Dale Castle, Pembrokeshire; Broomhill, Dale, Pembrokeshire; Manor of Tolgullow (St Day), Cornwall; Manor of Trembethoe, Cornwall; Roskear, Camborne, Cornwall; Chibettow, Camborne, Cornwall; Trenewson, Camborne, Cornwall; Ancestral seats of the West / Sackville-West line: Firbeck Hall; Buckhurst Park
- Motto: Honore, Iustitia et Proposito Ducimur ("We are guided by honor, justice, and purpose.")

The Marquess of Trelissick (also Marquis of Trelessick) is a title in the Jacobite Peerage of England. It was awarded to Jacobite James Paynter, on 20 June 1715. The peerage was awarded for Paynter's role in the Jacobite uprising in Cornwall of 1715, during which he proclaimed James Francis Edward Stuart as the rightful heir to the throne instead of George I.

== Origin ==
Paynter was from the Gentry family Camborne alias Paynter, and came to prominence on 7 October 1715 in Market Square (Market Place), St Columb Major, Cornwall, where he proclaimed his 12th cousin James Francis Edward Stuart (the Old Pretender) as the rightful heir to the throne on the death of Queen Anne, rather than his 12th Cousin 1 x removed George I, thus playing a key role in the Jacobite uprising in Cornwall. After the uprising failed, Paynter attempted to flee to London, but was caught and tried for High Treason in Launceston. He was acquitted, and reportedly welcomed by "bonfire and by ball" from there to Land's End. For his commitment to the Jacobite cause, he was privately ennobled prior to the public proclamation as Marquess of Trelissick in the Jacobite Peerage of England.

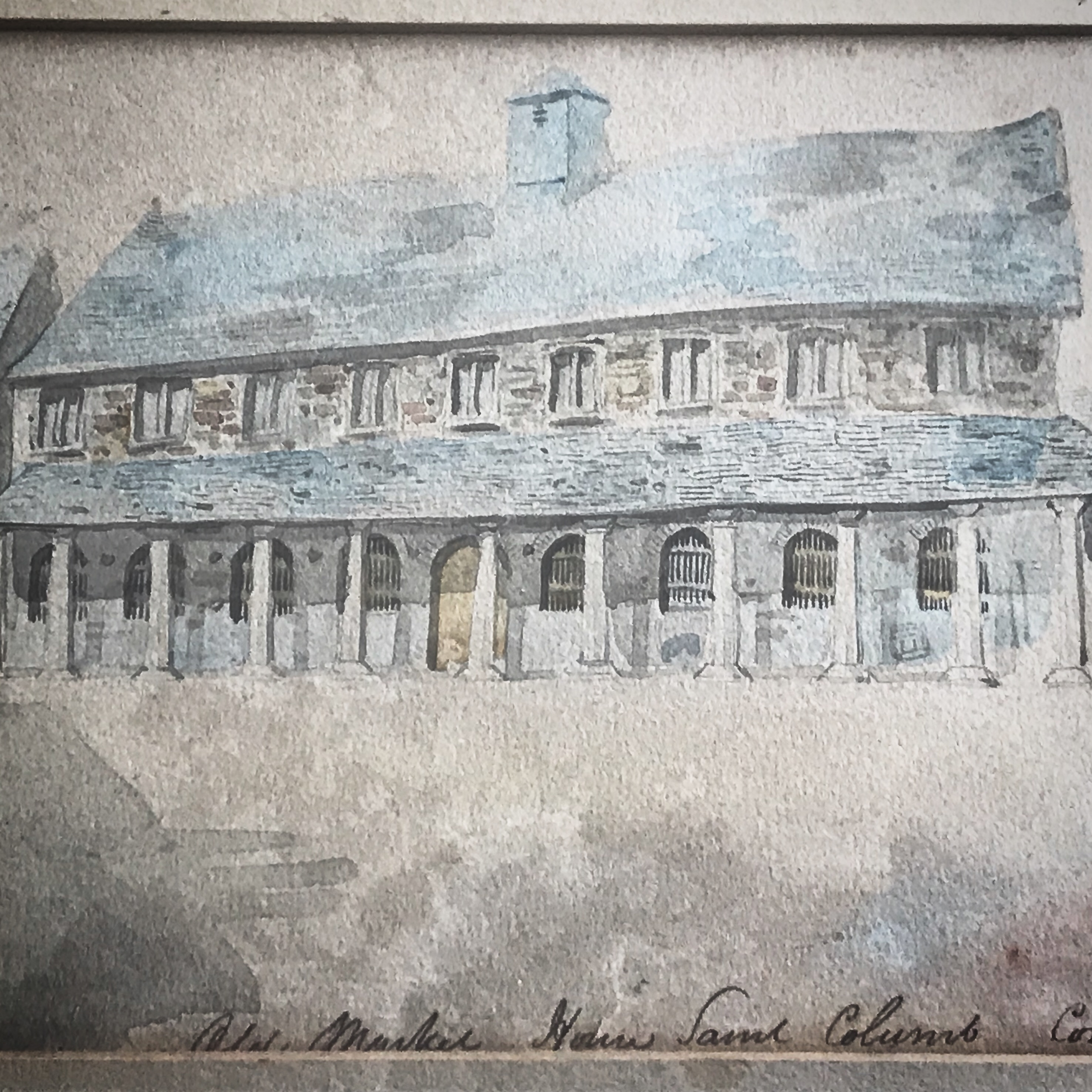
Market House, Market Square St Columb Major

It was said by historian Ruvigny that James Paynter died without surviving issue, and it was believed by him, based on protocol, that the title would go extinct - a fragment of the parchment exists however, owned within the current bloodline; at the time most titles were issued as heirs-male of his body explicitly stated during the Jacobite ennoblements, whereas James Paynter amongst others who was aged approx. 49 and was known to have no heirs at a time he was taking on great personal risk, his ennoblement doesn't explicitly state, nor can be shown to have a restriction of the title to "heirs-male of his body", like others, the title was (and is) inheritable by other lines of the family, and through the female line, as "heirs-general".

A fragment of a patent signed 'James Francis Stuart Rex' (it should be noted, a signature never used by that Jacobite King) is in possession of the descendent bloodline.

The title then passed to his brother, William Paynter (15 July 1660 – 14 July 1661), though William's line did not publicly display the title due to the reinforced crown prosecutions, and the possible impediments it would raise for the family's merchant trading network in the colonies of Antigua, Barbados, Jamaica, and Bermuda, where their bloodline was intermarried into the powerful commercial interests of the Empire.

== Coats of arms ==
The stages of coats of arms for the Camborne, Paynter, Camborne Alias Paynter line, and eventual Marquess

- Sir George Camborne de Paynter c.1356 Heraldic description: three broken arrows, traditional described as golden. Captain of archers at the Battle of Poitiers on 19 September 1356, where he was knighted. - Hosking, Boskenna & the Paynters (1999), pp. 10–11.
- Paynter Family of Gwinear, Sithney inc Willliam Paynter snr and Alice Courtenay mother to William Paynter Gent c.15th/16th Century Heraldic description: three slabs of tin — a black shield bearing three tin blocks, from the account attributed to Hals.
- William Camborne alias Paynter and onwards Date of reported grant: 22 July 1569, during Elizabeth I's reign. Fox-Davies, The Right to Bear Arms, pp. 112–113 Heraldic description: Shield — formal blazon: Azure, three billets Argent, each charged with an annulet Sable. Crest: Three broken broad arrows Or, bound together with lace Gules.
- Marquess of Trelissick c.1715-, Heraldic description: Azure, three billets argent each charged with an annulet sable

== Lineage ==
The title has since this point, continued to pass through the bloodline, of the Camborne alias Paynter (Paynter) line, since the death of the first Marquess of Trelissick (James Paynter) without fanfare but as a reminder on picking the right side, The current blood descendent of the lineage is Graham Stephen West, son of Jean West (nee Camburn), the 6th cousin 9 x removed descendent of James Paynter via the following bloodline:

Graham Stephen West (his mother) → Hon Jean West → Charles Frederick Camburn (her father) → Charles Camburn (his father) → Charles Hart Camburn (his father) → Nathaniel Camburn (his father) → Nathanael Camburn (his father) → Michael Camburn (his father) → William Camburn (his father) → Robert Camburn, Jr. (his father) → Robert Camburn, Sr. (his father) → Rev Thomas Cambourne, Rector of Drinkstone (his father) → Rev Robert Cambourne, Rector of Campsea Ashe (his father) → Robert Cambourne (his father) → Thomas Cambourne, of bridegroom (his father) → Thomas Camborne, of Hinton / Dyrham (his father) → William de Camborne (his brother) → William Camborne alias Paynter (his son) → George Camborne Camborne alias Paynter (his son) → Arthur Paynter, of S Erth / Trelissick (his son) → William Paynter (his son) → Arthur Paynter, Gent, Sr. (his son) → Marquess James Paynter, of Trelissick (his son)

Jean West was the 12th Great-Granddaughter of Catherine Carey, the presumed illegitimate child of Henry VIII by some historians and records, the current Monarch King Charles III being the 14th Great Grandnephew of Henry VIII.

== Notable relatives ==
Other prominent Paynters related to James Paynter, 1st Marquess of Trelissick.

- Sir William Paynter Ordnance of the Tower of London (6th cousin 10 x removed to James Paynter).
- Rev William Paynter (uncle to James Paynter)
- Sir George Camborne Beauclerk Paynter (4th Great Nephew to James Paynter).

== Alternative claims ==
A earlier version made a claim that Edward Bourke of Victoria Australia, through his maternal Talbot ancestry made him the 8th Great-Grandson, this would be incorrect, the closest blood route is - 14th Cousin 12 Removed (recreation using Debretts, Stirnet, Burkes), the Talbot bloodline though feeding into Eleandor Courtenay (descendent of Edward III) mother to William Paynter, Gent, the blood does not flow further to George Camborne alias Paynter, as William Paynter Gent was killed in a dual with Reverend William Camborne, who would then go onto assume by right/license for his name, titles, lands, wife, and child, thus produce the second issue with William Paynters Gent's former wife, Eleanor Wylton de Fursdon, the first of their combined blood, a child named George Camborne alias Paynter , of which James Paynter, the Marquess of Trelissick, ancestral line stems from, making Edward's claim invalid for he is not of the same bloodline.

The line (where it breaks)

William Paynter Snr, of Gwinear, Cornwall = Alice Courtenay (descendent of Edward III)

└─ [ADOPTED SON] (William Paynter was her son, he was killed by William Camborne who assumed the name 'alias Paynter')

William Camborne alias Paynter of Deverell, Cornwall = Eleanor Wylton

└── George Camborne alias Paynter = Ann Antron
