= Darrell Weaver =

American politician (born 1962)

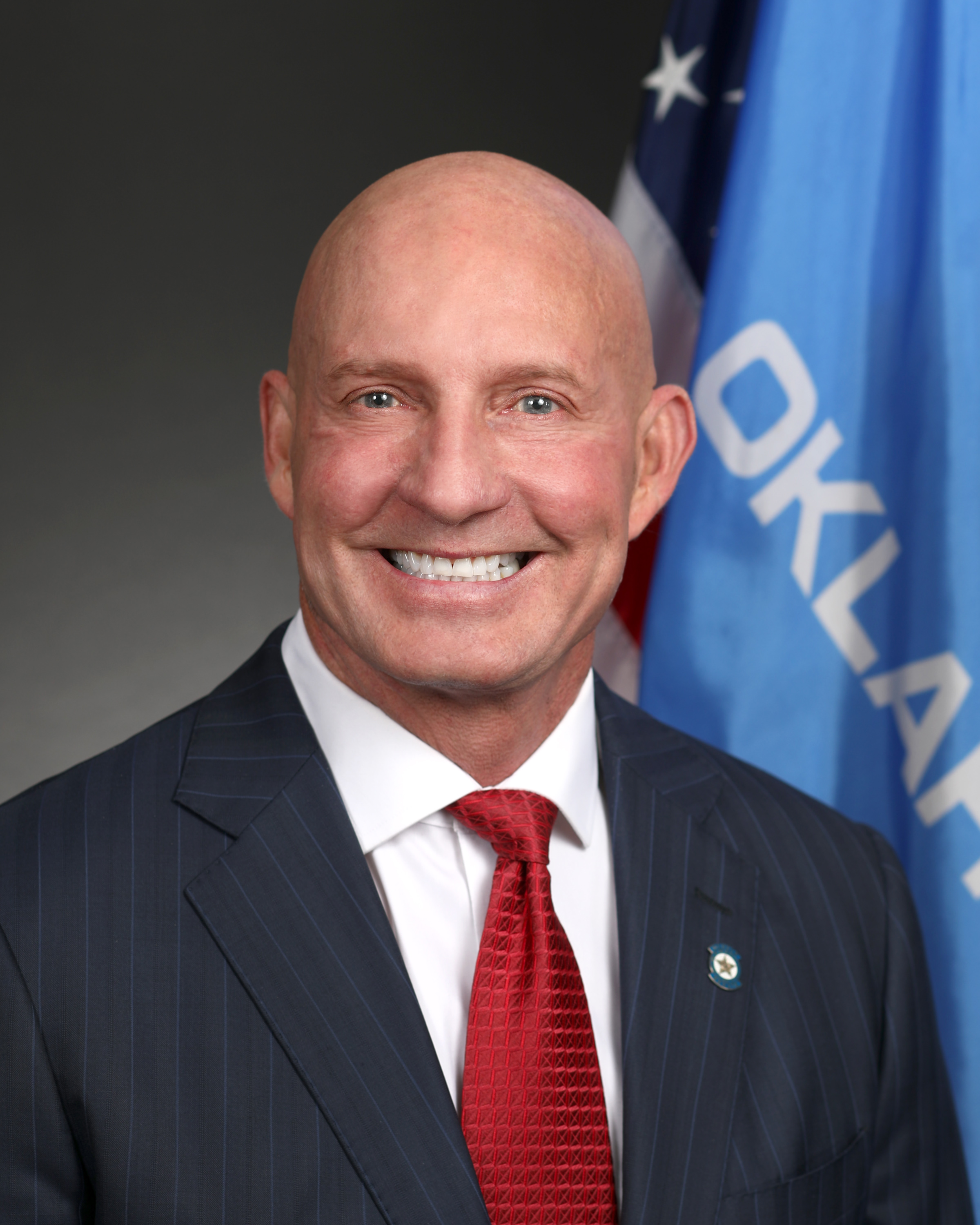
- Weaver's official senate portrait

Cleveland County Sheriff
- Incumbent
- Assumed office July 6, 2026
- Preceded by: Chris Amason

Member of the Oklahoma Senate from the 24th district
- In office November 15, 2018 – July 5, 2026
- Preceded by: Anthony Sykes
- Succeeded by: Jon Painter

Personal details
- Born: March 15, 1962 (age 64) Moore, Oklahoma, U. S.
- Party: Republican
- Education: Cameron University (BA); Oklahoma Christian University (MBA)

Darrell Weaver (born March 15, 1962) is an American politician served in the Oklahoma Senate from the 24th district from 2018 to 2026. Prior to his time in the legislature, Weaver served 28 years in law enforcement including nine years as the Director of the Oklahoma Bureau of Narcotics.

== Early life and education ==
Darrell Weaver was born on March 15, 1962, in Moore, Oklahoma. He graduated from Cameron University in 1986 and later earned a master's degree from Oklahoma Christian University.

== Oklahoma Bureau of Narcotics ==
He was commissioned as an officer with the Oklahoma Bureau of Narcotics and Dangerous Drugs in 1987. In 1996, he was promoted to the agent-in-charge for the Oklahoma City enforcement unit. In September 2006, he was appointed director of the Oklahoma Bureau of Narcotics and Dangerous Drugs. He served in that position until his retirement in November 2015. In 2014, he was inducted into the Oklahoma Law Enforcement Hall of Fame.

== Oklahoma Senate ==
In August 2017, Weaver launched a campaign for the 24th district of the Oklahoma Senate. He won the 2018 election and was reelected in 2022 without opposition.

In April 2025, he launched a campaign for Lieutenant Governor of Oklahoma in 2026 election. He lost the primary election to T. W. Shannon.

In June 2026, he was appointed county sheriff for Cleveland County to succeed Chris Amason.

== Personal life ==
He is a Christian, married, and has five children.
