= Trekenning =

Hamlet in Cornwall, England

Coordinates: 50.42522°N 4.94561°W

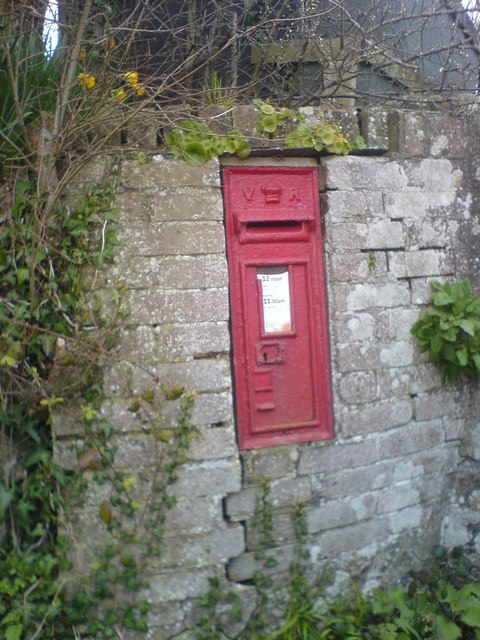
The Trekenning post box

Trekenning (Cornish: Trehepkenyn) is a hamlet south of St Columb Major, Cornwall, England, United Kingdom.

== Trekenning House ==
Trekenning House is a Grade II, listed building, once the home of the Paynter family. One notable resident of Trekenning was Commander John Pender Paynter. He was an officer of the British Royal Navy noted for his services during the Napoleonic Wars. In 1815 Paynter was appointed Flag Lieutenant to Lord Exmouth on HMS Boyne. In 1816, he was involved in the Bombardment of Algiers.
