= John Paynter =

John Paynter may refer to:

- John Pender Paynter (1788–1856), British Royal Navy officer
- John Paynter (RAF officer) (1898–1918), World War I Royal Naval Air Service flying ace
- John Paynter (composer) (1931–2010), British composer and music educator
- John Paynter (footballer) (born 1960), Australian rules footballer
- John H. Paynter (1862–1947), African American writer of poetry and nonfiction

== See also ==
- John Painter (disambiguation)
- John Payntor (died 1540), English MP
