= William Nicholls (theologian) =

English clergyman and theologian

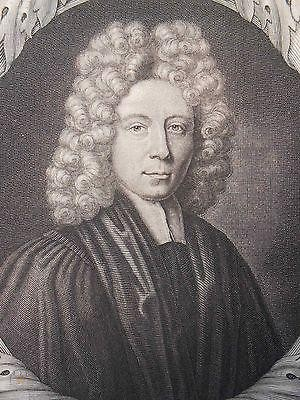
- Born: 1664
- Died: 1712 (aged 47–48)
- Burial place: centre aisle of St Swithin's Church, London
- Education: St Paul's School, Wadham College (B.A.), Merton College (M.A., B.D., D.D.)
- Occupations: clergyman and theologian
- Known for: chaplain, rector and canon at several places
- Notable work: Comment on the Book of Common Prayer, and Administration of the Sacraments
- Father: John Nicholls of Donington

William Nicholls (1664–1712) was an English clergyman and theologian, known as an author on the Book of Common Prayer.

== Life ==
He was the son of John Nicholls of Donington, now Dunton, Buckinghamshire. He was educated at St Paul's School under Thomas Gale, and went up with an exhibition to Magdalen Hall, Oxford, where he matriculated as a commoner on 26 March 1680. He later migrated to Wadham College, and graduated B.A. on 27 November 1683. On 6 October 1684 he was chosen a probationary fellow of Merton College, and proceeded M.A. 19 June 1688, B.D. 2 July 1692, and D.D. 29 November 1695.

Having taken holy orders about 1688, he became chaplain to Ralph Montagu, and in September 1691 rector of Selsey, near Chichester. He was also rector of Bushey, Hertfordshire, from 1691 to 1693, and in 1707 a canon of Chichester.

He suffered from poverty in later life. He was buried in the centre aisle of St Swithin's Church in London.

== Works ==
Much of his life was spent in literary work. In 1711 he was editing John Selden's output.

Nicholls's major work was the Comment on the Book of Common Prayer, and Administration of the Sacraments, London, 1710, with a Supplement published separately in 1711. This book was published by subscription, and dedicated to Queen Anne. He did it unassisted and it cost him his health.

Another of Nicholls's publications, the Defensio Ecclesiæ Anglicanæ, London, 1707 and 1708, was written and published in Latin. An English translation by the author appeared in 1715. The book was meant to attract attention of foreigners to the formularies of the English church, and Latin copies were sent to the King of Prussia and to scholars on the continent. Correspondence resulted including letters from Daniel Jablonski, Benedict Pictet, Jean le Clerc, Johann Jacob Wettstein and others. Nicholls's views were contested and answered by James Peirce in Vindication of the Dissenters (London, 1718).

Nicholls's other works included:

- An Answer to an Heretical Book, called the Naked Gospel, 1691, against Arthur Bury. Printed with ‘A Short History of Socinianism.’
- A Practical Essay on the Contempt of the World, inscribed to his schoolfellow, (Note: The 19th-century DNB calls Trevor a schoolfellow of Nicholls. This appears to an error. The Essay is dedicated, "To the Right Honourable Sir John Trevor Kt. Master of the Rolls, Speaker to the House of Commons, and One of Their Majesties most Honourable Privy-Council". This is undoubtedly the John Trevor born c. 1634 and educated at Ruthin School; but, Nicholls was born in 1664 and educated at St Paul's School.) Sir John Trevor, 1694.
- A Conference with a Theist, in five parts, 1696 (3rd edit., enlarged to 2 vols., in 1723).
- The Duty of Inferiours towards their Superiours, in five Practical Discourses, 1701.
- A Treatise of Consolation to Parents for the Death of their Children (on the occasion of the Duke of Gloucester's death), 1701.
- The Religion of a Prince (on the relinquishing of tenths and first-fruits by Queen Anne), 1704.
- A Paraphrase on the Common Prayer …, 1708.
- Historiæ Sacræ Libri vii., opus ex Antonii Socceii Sabellici Eneadibus concinnatum, 1710, and 1711.
- A Commentary on the first fifteen and part of the sixteenth Articles of the Church of England, 1712.
- A Defence of the Doctrine and Discipline of the Church of England (a translation of his Defensio Ecclesiæ Anglicanæ), 1715. These last two were posthumously published.
