= John Bury (divine) =

English divine

John Bury (1580–1667), was an English divine.

== Life ==
Bury was the son of a descendant of the Devonshire family of Bury, long resident at Colyton, who was in business at Tiverton, was born there in 1580. On 9 February 1597 he was elected a scholar of Corpus Christi College, Oxford, and in 1603, shortly after he had taken his degree of B.A., he became the first fellow of Balliol College under the bequest of Peter Blundell. After remaining for several years at the university he returned to his native county, where he obtained the vicarage of Heavitree and a canonry in Exeter Cathedral, his collation to the latter preferment dating 20 March 1637.

A few years later he resigned his benefice in favour of a relation, and accepted the rectory of Widworthy in the same county. The latter preferment he retained until his death, and after the Restoration (2 March 1662) the rectory of St. Mary Major, Exeter, was conferred upon him. He died on 5 July 1667, and was buried in the middle area of Exeter Cathedral.

== Works and legacy ==
The presentment of Bury and the other prebendaries at William Laud's visitation, 19 June 1634, is printed in Hist. MSS. Comm. 4th Rep. p. 138. His literary works were few in number: two sermons (1615 and 1631) and a catechism for the use of his parishioners at Widworthy (1661). He endowed a school in St. Sidwell's, Exeter, left funds for the maintenance of thirteen poor persons in St. Catherine's Almshouse in the same city and for the poor of his native town of Tiverton, and largely added to the resources of the public workhouse at St. Sidwell's.

== Family ==
Canon Bury had two sons, Arthur Bury the rector of Exeter College, Oxford, and John, a colonel in the parliamentary army. Portraits of all three were in the workhouse at Exeter.
