= 2026 Oklahoma lieutenant gubernatorial election =

- November 3, 2026
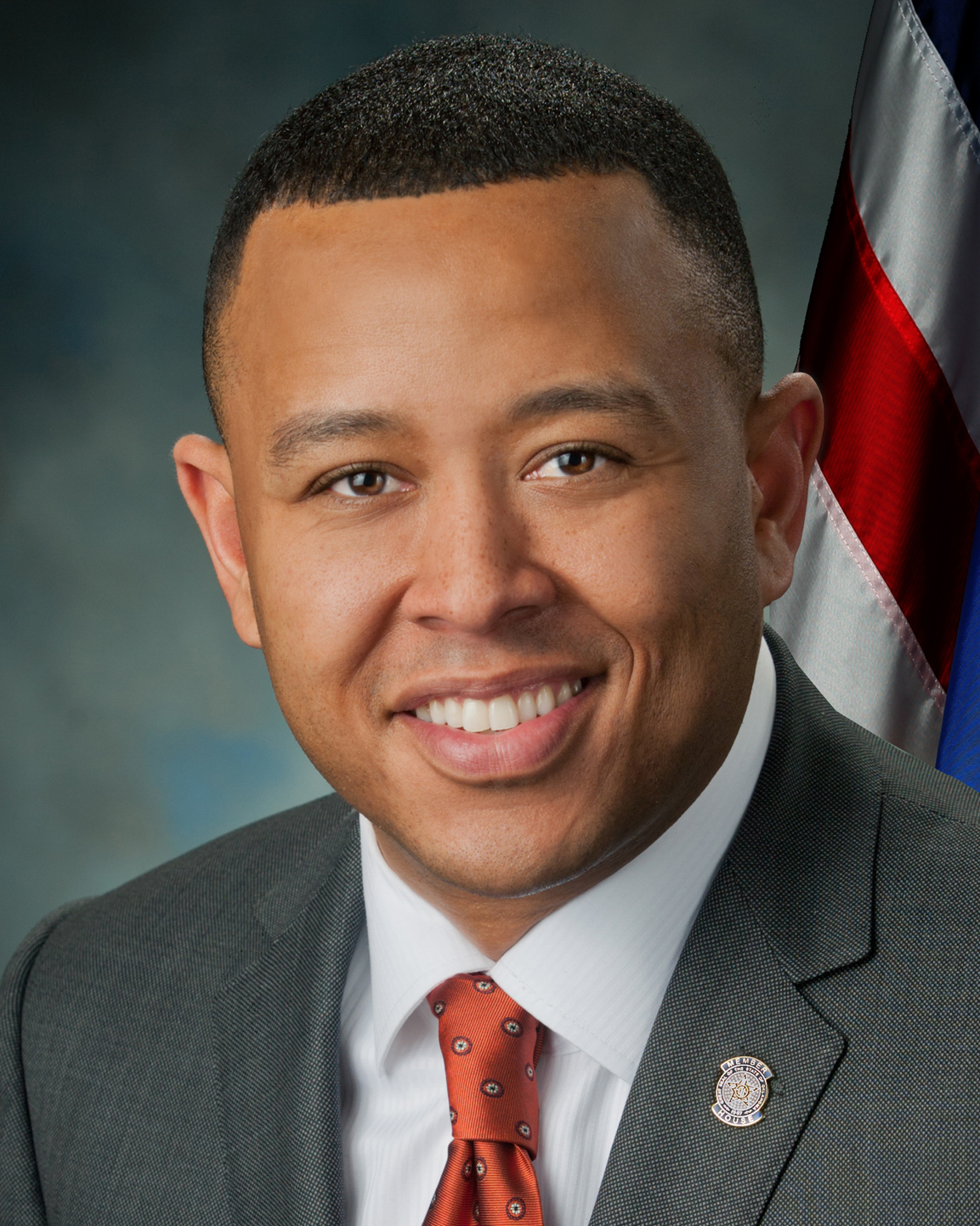

| Nominee | T. W. Shannon | Kelly Forbes |
| Party | Republican | Democratic |
| Popular vote | 646,619 | 472,357 |
| Percentage | 57.8% | 42.2% |
Lieutenant Governor before election
Matt Pinnell
Republican
Elected Lieutenant Governor
T. W. Shannon
Republican

The 2026 Oklahoma lieutenant gubernatorial election took place on November 3, 2026, to elect the next lieutenant governor of Oklahoma. Incumbent Matt Pinnell was term-limited and ineligible to seek a third full consecutive term.

== Background ==
Incumbent Republican lieutenant governor Matt Pinnell was term-limited in 2026. Official candidate filing for the office was in April 2026. Reporting on the campaign began in January 2025 when state auditor and inspector Cindy Byrd registered an official campaign committee to run for the seat. Byrd released a statement saying her official campaign launch would come later that year.

== Republican primary ==
=== Candidates ===
==== Nominee ====
- T. W. Shannon, former Speaker of the Oklahoma House of Representatives (2013–2014) from the 62nd district (2007–2015) and candidate for U.S. Senate in 2014 and 2022

==== Eliminated in primary ====
- Victor Flores, businessman
- Brian Hill, state representative (2018–present)
- Justin Humphrey, state representative (2016–present)
- David Ostrowe
- Darrell Weaver, state senator (2018–present)

==== Withdrawn ====
- Cindy Byrd, incumbent state auditor (2019–present) (running for state treasurer)
- Chris White, former county commissioner for McCurtain County's 1st district

=== Endorsements ===
T. W. Shannon

Executive branch officials

- Donald Trump, president of the United States (2017–2021, 2025–present)

Organizations

- Oklahoma Association of General Contractors

=== Polling ===
| Poll source | Date(s) administered | Sample size (Note: Key: A – all adults RV – registered voters LV – likely voters V – unclear) | Margin of error | Cindy Byrd | H. Victor Flores | Brian Hill | Justin Humphrey | David Ostrowe | T.W. Shannon | Darrel Weaver | Undecided |
|---|---|---|---|---|---|---|---|---|---|---|---|
| Cole Hargrave Snodgrass & Associates | April 26–29, 2026 | 500 (RV) | ± 4.3% | - | 2% | 3% | 7% | 2% | 42% | 6% | 39% |
| Cole Hargrave Snodgrass & Associates | Jan. 26–30, 2026 | 600 (RV) | ± 4.3% | 23% | - | 2% | 6% | - | 39% | 3% | 27% |

=== Results ===
Primary results by county: Shannon: 30–40%; 40–50%; 50–60%; 60–70%; 70–80%; Humphrey: 40–50%; 50–60%

Republican primary results
| Party | Candidate | Votes | % |
|---|---|---|---|
| Republican | T. W. Shannon | 209,377 | 53.8 |
| Republican | Darrell Weaver | 50,738 | 13.0 |
| Republican | Justin Humphrey | 48,902 | 12.6 |
| Republican | David Ostrowe | 36,080 | 9.3 |
| Republican | Brian Hill | 29,445 | 7.6 |
| Republican | H. Victor Flores | 14,939 | 3.8 |
| Total votes | | 389,481 | 100.0 |

== Democratic primary ==
=== Candidates ===
==== Nominee ====
- Kelly Forbes, consultant and educator

==== Withdrawn ====
- Candice Jay, U.S. Navy veteran

== Polling ==
| Poll source | Date(s) administered | Sample size | Margin of error | T. W. Shannon (R) | Kelly Forbes (D) | Undecided |
|---|---|---|---|---|---|---|
| CHS & Associates | August 3–6, 2026 | 500 (RV) | ± 4.3% | 51% | 34% | 15% |

== Results ==
2026 Oklahoma lieutenant gubernatorial election
| Party | Candidate | Votes | % | ±% |
|---|---|---|---|---|
| Republican | T. W. Shannon | 646,619 | 57.79 | −7.08 |
| Democratic | Kelly Forbes | 472,357 | 42.21 | +11.19 |
| Total votes | | 1,118,976 | 100.0 | |
| Republican hold | | | | |

== See also ==
- 2026 United States lieutenant gubernatorial elections
- 2026 Oklahoma elections
