= Arthur Bury =

English college head and Anglican theologian

Arthur Bury, D.D. (1624-1714?) was an English college head and Anglican theologian of controversial views. His 1690 antitrinitarian work, The Naked Gospel, first published anonymously, was commanded to be burnt at Oxford, and, in a complex sequence of events involving legal action, Bury lost his position as Rector of Exeter College, Oxford after being expelled initially in 1689.

William Prideaux Courtney in the Dictionary of National Biography stated that "His object was to free the gospel from the additions and corruptions of later ages, and he sums up its doctrines 'in two precepts—believe and repent.'" Jonathan Israel characterizes Bury as a "crypto-Socinian"; he is now often claimed as a Unitarian sympathizer, with a strong interest in the monotheism of Islam. Bury was in fact in the tradition of latitudinarianism and Protestant irenicism, and the early Unitarian Thomas Firmin had a hand in the publication, which suggested that a minimal set of articles of Christian faith should suffice; but he included Arianism as an acceptable position for salvation.

== Life ==
He was the son of the Rev. John Bury (1580–1667), and matriculated at Exeter College, Oxford, on 5 April 1639, aged 15. He took his degree of B.A. on 29 November 1642, was elected a Petreian fellow of his college on 30 June 1643, and become full fellow on 6 May 1645. A royalist, he refused to submit to the parliamentary visitors of the university, and took refuge with his father in Devon. At the Restoration of 1660 he was restored to his fellowship. In 1666 the rectorship at Exeter College became vacant, and Bury was elected (27 May), on the recommendation of Archbishop Gilbert Sheldon and with heavy-handed support from Charles II. On 22 June in the same year he took the degree of B.D. and five days later became D.D.

There were disputes in 1669 over the election of Fellows, and he suspended five of them. The Visitor (the Bishop of Exeter) in 1675 complained of his management of college property, and of laxity of the internal discipline. In 1689 a further serious trouble arose. Bury had expelled one of the fellows on a probably groundless charge. The Visitor was now Jonathan Trelawny, and he ordered the restoration of the man in question, but when the bishop held a formal visitation, Bury tried to shut the gates against him. Bury and his backers were thereupon expelled, and a new Rector was elected in his stead: William Paynter, one of the Fellows suspended in 1669. The legality of Bury's deprivation was tried in the King's Bench and the House of Lords, which on 10 December 1694 decided against Bury.

He was one of the vicars of Bampton, Oxford, but resigned in 1707. The date of his death is not known with certainty, but is believed to have been about 1714.

== Works ==
The treatise issued in 1690, under the title of The Naked Gospel, by a true son of the Church of England, was discovered to be the work of Bury, and for some passages in it a charge of Socinianism was brought up against him. An answer to it was published in 1690 by William Nicholls, fellow of Merton College. Another reply came out in the next year from Thomas Long, and a third by Henry Felton appeared in 1725. There was support from Jean Le Clerc, in An Historical Vindication of the Naked Gospel. Bury had immediate support from James Parkinson, who in Fire's Continued at Oxford (1690) argued that he was a target of political venom from Tories.

The Naked Gospel was condemned by a decree of convocation of Oxford (19 August 1690) and was publicly burnt in the area of the schools. On 30 August Bury had printed a letter of fifteen pages, The Fires continued at Oxford, in defence of his conduct, and in 1691 he brought out, under his own name, a second edition of The Naked Gospel. Twelve years later (1703) he published an enlarged work, The rational Deist satisfy'd by a just account of the Gospel. In two parts; second edition.

== Notes ==
Academic offices
Preceded by Joseph Maynard	Rector of Exeter College, Oxford; 1666–1690	Succeeded by William Paynter
