= David Painter =

David Painter or Panter may refer to:

- David Painter (priest) (born 1944), English clergyman, Archdeacon of Oakham
- David S. Painter (born 1948), American historian
- David Panter or Painter (died 1558), Scottish diplomat, clerk and bishop of Ross

== See also ==
- David Paynter (disambiguation)
