= David William Paynter =

David William Paynter (1791–1823) was an English author.

== Life ==
The son of Richard Walter Paynter, an attorney, he was born in Manchester, and educated at Manchester Grammar School. Giving up on a medical career, he took up poetry and drama, and became closely associated with James Watson, a local writer, with whom he figured in magazines and newspapers as "Corporal Trim", while Watson called himself "Uncle Toby". Watson was associated with the Manchester Magazine of 1815–6, and died in Manchester in 1823.

In the introduction to his King Stephen, Paynter described his efforts to get it staged. After his pieces had been declined by several managers, he collected a company of his own, and produced King Stephen at the Minor Theatre, Manchester, on 5 December 1821. He died in Manchester on 14 March 1823, and was buried at Blackley. He had married in 1813, and left children.

== Works ==
Paynter published:

- The History and Adventures of Godfrey Ranger, 1813, 3 vols., a novel in the style of Tobias Smollett.
- Eurypilus, King of Sicily: a Tragedy in Five Acts and in Verse, 1816.
- The Muse in Idleness, 1819. This book was the subject of a sarcastic article by James Crossley in Blackwood's Magazine.
- King Stephen; or, the Battle of Lincoln: an Historical Tragedy in Five Acts and in Verse, 1822.
- The Wife of Florence: a Tragedy, 1823 (published posthumously).

In 1820 Paynter edited Watson's literary remains, as The Spirit of the Doctor. He appended some of his own writings, including letters from Lancaster Castle, where he had been a prisoner for debt.

== Notes ==
Attribution

This article incorporates text from a publication now in the public domain: Lee, Sidney, ed. (1895). "Paynter, David William". Dictionary of National Biography. Vol. 44. London: Smith, Elder & Co.
