= Kenstec =

9th-century Bishop of Cornwall

- Bishop of Cornwall
- Appointed: between 823 and 870
- Term ended: unknown

Orders
- Consecration: between 823 and 870

Personal details
- Died: before a period between 888 and 893
- Denomination: Christian

Kenstec was a medieval Bishop of Cornwall.

Kenstec was consecrated between 823 and 870. His death date was sometime before 893.

Kenstec's seat lay in "the monastery of Dinuurrin"' which may be Bodmin. He professed obedience to the Archbishop of Canterbury, marking a stage in the incorporation of Cornwall into the English church. It is not clear whether there was only one bishop in Cornwall at this time, as there may have been another at St Germans, and it is also not clear whether Cornish bishoprics continued into the later ninth century.
