= Deverell =

Deverell is a surname. Notable people with the surname include:

- Christopher Deverell MBE, a British Army officer and Director General Logistics Support and Equipment at HQ Land Forces
- Colville Deverell GBE, KCMG (1907–1995), Irish cricketer and colonial administrator
- Cyril Deverell GCB, KBE, ADC (1874–1947), British career military officer, Chief of the Imperial General Staff in 1936 and 1937
- Jack Deverell KCB OBE (born 1945), Commander-in-Chief Allied Forces Northern Europe
- John Deverell (1880–1965), British actor
- Richard Deverell (born 1965), director of the Royal Botanic Gardens, Kew
- Rita Deverell CM (born 1945), Canadian television broadcaster and social activist
- Walter Deverell (1827–1854), English artist, born in the US, associated with the Pre-Raphaelite Brotherhood
- William Deverell (born 1937), Canadian novelist, activist, and criminal lawyer
