= John Pender Paynter =

Commander John Pender Paynter R.N. (1788–1856) of Trekenning House, St Columb Major, Cornwall, was an officer of the British Royal Navy noted for his services during the Napoleonic Wars. In 1815 Paynter was appointed Flag Lieutenant to Lord Exmouth on HMS Boyne. In 1816 during the Bombardment of Algiers, Paynter was sent ashore in an attempt to secure the release of Christian slaves and to demand the release from custody of a Colonel Macdonald, the English Consul but was himself seized by the Dey and lodged in the Black Hole. However, the menacing attitude assumed by the British Fleet assured his release.

== Naval career ==
He entered the Royal Navy, 1804 as first class volunteer in HMS San Josef and was made midshipman August of the same Year; was employed in the blockade of Brest up to January, 1806 when he joined HMS Indefatigable; took part in Lord Cochrane's attack upon the French fleet in the Aix Roads April, 1809; joined the San Josef again in February the following year and joined HMS Euryalus as lieutenant, where he took part in several bombardments on the coast of Calabria; he contributed to the destruction 16 May 1813 of the xebec Fortune lying in the harbour of Cavalarie; in the following winter drove on shore in Calvi Bay the French store-ship Balleine and a large national schooner. In 1814 Lieutenant Paynter proceeded to America and was present at the capture of Fort Washington and the capitulation of Alexandria up the Patuxent: On his return to England in 1816, Paynter was advanced to commander.

== See also ==
- O'Byrne, William Richard (1849). "Paynter, John Pender" . A Naval Biographical Dictionary . John Murray – via Wikisource.
