= James Paynter =

James Paynter (1666 – date of death unknown) was an English gentleman and the leader of a Jacobite uprising in Cornwall in 1715. He is best known for publicly proclaiming James Francis Edward Stuart (the "Old Pretender") as the rightful King of England, Scotland, and Ireland, an act for which he was tried for high treason, acquitted and subsequently elevated to the Jacobite peerage.

== Early life and background ==
James Paynter was born in Cornwall in 1666 and baptized on 18 August of that year in St Erth. He was the son of Arthur Paynter, a gentleman, and Mary (née Praed) Paynter.

The Paynters were a well-established and wealthy Cornish family originating from Trelissick Manor in Hayle. James himself belonged to a junior branch of the family that resided at Trekenning House in the parish of St Columb Major. Throughout the late 17th and early 18th centuries, various branches of the Paynter family maintained strong local influence and covertly harboured strong loyalties to the House of Stuart.

== The 1715 Rising and trial ==
Following the death of Queen Anne in 1714 and the accession of the Hanoverian George I, tensions boiled over among supporters of the exiled Stuart dynasty. On 7 October 1715, James Paynter stepped forward as a central figure of the abortive Jacobite rising in the West Country. In the market square of St Columb Major, accompanied by several local gentlemen and townsfolk, Paynter openly proclaimed James Francis Edward Stuart as "James III and VIII." This act served as virtually the sole tangible manifestation of the 1715 Jacobite rebellion within Cornwall, as many other local Jacobite leaders, like Sir Richard Vyvyan, 3rd Baronet, had been preemptively arrested.

Government authorities quickly moved against him, and Paynter was arrested and put on trial for high treason at Launceston, Cornwall. However, leveraging his legal status as a registered Cornish tinner, Paynter successfully claimed his ancient privilege to be judged by a jury of his peers. The jury of fellow Cornish tinners promptly acquitted him of all charges. Following his release, Paynter was reportedly greeted with widespread public jubilation, celebrated by "bonfire and by ball" all the way from Launceston to Land's End.

== Jacobite Peerage ==
In recognition of his steadfast loyalty and leadership during the unsuccessful insurrection, James Paynter was created the Marquess of Trelissick (sometimes styled Marquis of Trelessick) in the Jacobite Peerage on 20 June 1715, by James Francis Edward Stuart.

== Later life and legacy ==
Little is documented regarding Paynter's life following his dramatic acquittal and quasi ennoblement, and the exact date and location of his death remain unknown. Because he died without direct issue, the Jacobite title was long thought to have become extinct, though later genealogical research noted that the patent's remainder allowed for inheritance through heirs-general.

Generations later, Paynter’s legacy was preserved in local Cornish folklore, particularly regarding the family's enduring association with the Jacobite cause. His relations at Boskenna were known to be Jacobites. During the Jacobite Rising of 1745, villagers in St Buryan were convinved members of the Paynter family assisted Charles Edward Stuart (the Young Pretender).

Peerage of England
New title	— TITULAR — Marquess of Trelissick; Jacobite peerage 1715–?	Unknown
