= Jon Painter =

American politician

Member of the Oklahoma Senate from the 24th district
- Incumbent
- Assumed office November 18, 2026
- Preceded by: Darrell Weaver

Personal details
- Party: Republican

Jon Painter is an American politician. A member of the Republican Party, he is the member of the Oklahoma Senate for the 24th district. He was elected at the 2026 election.
