= John Painter (cricketer) =

English cricketer

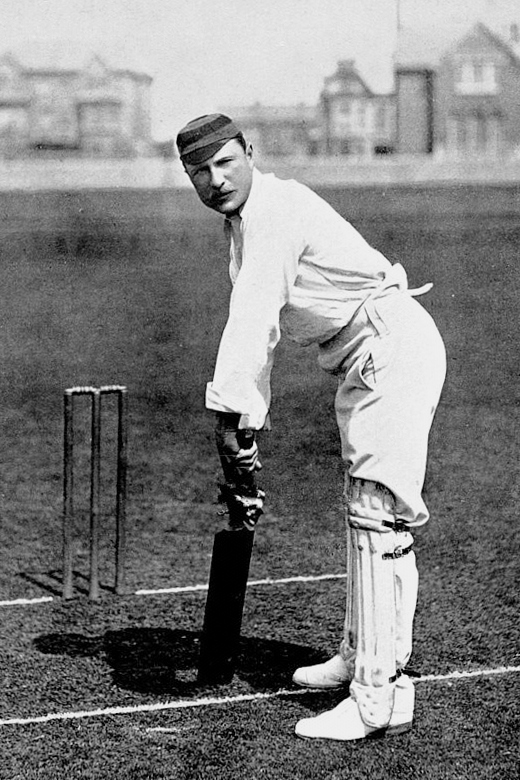
- Painter in about 1895

Personal information
- Full name: John Richard Painter
- Born: 11 November 1856; Bourton-on-the-Water, Gloucestershire, England
- Died: 16 September 1900 (aged 43); Bourton-on-the-Water, England
- Batting: Right-handed
- Bowling: Right-arm fast

Domestic team information
- Years: Team
- 1881–1897: Gloucestershire
- 1884: South
- 1885: Lord Sheffield's XI

Career statistics
Competition	First-class
Matches	198
Runs scored	5,927
Batting average	17.58
100s/50s	5/0
Top score	150
Balls bowled	3,052
Wickets	46
Bowling average	26.78
5 wickets in innings	2
10 wickets in match	1
Best bowling	8/67
Catches/stumpings	151/–
- Source: Cricinfo, 28 January 2012

John Richard Painter (11 November 1856 – 16 September 1900) was an English cricketer who played professionally for Gloucestershire, South, Lord Sheffield's XI and an England Eleven.

== Playing career ==
Painter began his professional career with Lancashire club Clitheroe before joining Gloucestershire in 1881. Between 1881 and 1897 he played 192 matches for the county. In August 1894, the match played at Clifton College Close Ground between Gloucestershire and Middlesex was awarded to him as a benefit.

== Later life ==
In 1895, he opened a cricket and athletic store in Clifton, Bristol. When he died in 1900 at the age of 43, he left a widow and two children.
