= Jacobite uprising in Cornwall of 1715 =

Uprising in England

The Jacobite uprising in Cornwall of 1715 was an unsuccessful Jacobite attempt at launching a rebellion against the Hanoverian regime which took place in the county of Cornwall. It had been planned to coincide with the wider Jacobite Rising of 1715, but was ended by the preemptive arrest of its key leaders before the rebellion could gain momentum.

== Background ==
On 1 August 1714, Queen Anne died, George, Elector of Hanover, the son of the Electress Sophia, granddaughter of James I (1566–1625) was proclaimed King under the Act of Settlement of 1701. However, James Stuart, the surviving legitimate son of James II of England who had been deposed in Glorious Revolution of 1688, believed he had a stronger claim to The Crown. Major riots broke out across Great Britain at the time of the coronation of George I. This show of feeling prompted James Stuart, who subsequently became known as the Old Pretender, to believe he had enough support to use military force to claim the British throne.

== Cornish support ==
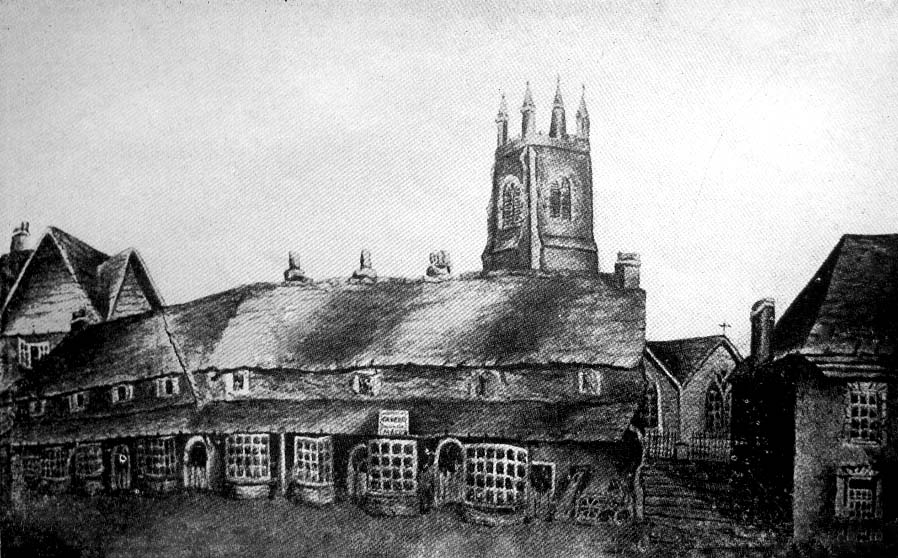
St Columb town square. The site of the proclamation in Cornwall

The main leaders of the Jacobite uprising in Cornwall were the High Tories James Butler, 2nd Duke of Ormonde and Henry St John, 1st Viscount Bolingbroke. Part of their scheme was to capture Bristol, Exeter and Plymouth. With these important places in the hands of the Jacobites, they hoped that other smaller towns would join the cause. Ormonde had implicit confidence in Colonel Maclean, who had been sent to Devon and Cornwall to visit prominent members of the Tory party, and others likely to support the Pretender's cause. It turned out that Maclean was probably a spy who supplied the government with names of Jacobite adherents, and measures were taken to prevent their committing mischief or folly.

On 22 September, John Anstis, MP for Launceston, was arrested for plotting an uprising and on 6 October Sir Richard Vyvyan of Trelowarren (and Trewan Hall, St Columb Major), MP for Cornwall and the most influential Jacobite in the West of England, was taken and sent to London in the custody of a messenger. On 7 October Mr James Paynter of Trekenning, proclaimed the Pretender in the market square at St Columb Major in Cornwall. At this time the representative of the Government in Cornwall was Hugh Boscawen, of Tregothnan. This gentleman called out the militia and took measures which effectively put an end to any attempt at a rising. James Paynter and his servant along with fellow rebel, Henry Darr (also of St Columb), fled to London and remained undiscovered for some time. Paynter's servant at this time was sending letters to a sweetheart at St Columb and it seems that the postmaster suspected that the letter came from one of the suspects and inspecting the letter found that it come from London. Immediately warrants were ordered but they denied their names until eventually a messenger was sent to London who knew them particularly well and they were found to be the same persons.

Some time later Paynter and his fellow rebels were sent to Newgate to be tried for high treason. Paynter claimed to be a judge in Cornwall, so he was tried at Launceston. Here Henry Darr died in the prison. Eventually Paynter was acquitted by a packed Jacobite jury. Following the release of the rebels, friends appeared with white cockades in their hats (a Jacobite symbol), as a token of joy they were welcomed with "bonfire and ball" all the way to Lands End.

=== Proclamation at St Columb ===
In October 1716, the names associated with the proclamation of James III at St Columb were as follows: James Paynter, jun.; Thomas Bishop, gent.; Henry Darr, (bayliff and inn keeper); Anthony Hoskin, (pewterer); Francis Brewer, jun.; Richard Whitford, (barber); John Angove, (clothier); Richard Meter, (taylor).

According to Henry Jenner, it seems probable that the postmaster who opened the letter from James Paynter's servant was none other than the celebrated Ralph Allen, afterwards of Bath. He certainly was at St Columb post office at that time and his distinguishing himself by his scrupulous performance may have been the beginning of his fortunes.

== In fiction ==
- Best, G M (2013). The Jacobite Murders. Robert Hale Ltd. Mentions the events in Cornwall.
- Lee, Katharine (1895). When Fortune Frowns. London Horace Cox. A fictional account based on historical facts of the Jacobite rising in Cornwall.
- Kearsley, Susanna (2011). The Rose Garden. Allison and Busby. A fictional romance based on the Cornish part in the Jacobite uprising.

== See also ==
The following give a background to Cornish involvement in other rebellions.

- Cornish Rebellion of 1497
- Second Cornish Uprising of 1497
- Prayer Book Rebellion (1549)
- Monmouth Rebellion (1685)
- Bloody Assizes of (1685)
- The Glorious Revolution (1688)
- Sir Jonathan Trelawny, 3rd Baronet (1650–1721), one of the Seven Bishops tried under James II and the hero of the Cornish ballad, The Song of the Western Men
- Jacobitism
