= William Paynter (academic) =

English clergyman and Vice-Chancellor

Rev. William Paynter D.D. (1637 – 18 February 1716) was an English clergyman and Vice-Chancellor of Oxford University.

The son of William Paynter or Cambo[u]rne, from Antron in Sithney, and Jane, the sixth child of Richard Keigwin of Mousehole, he was born at Trelissick Manor in the parish of St Erth, Cornwall, England, and baptised on 7 December 1637. Having been admitted as a poor scholar in February 1656, he matriculated from Exeter College, Oxford, on 29 March that year, and on 3 July 1657 he was elected to a fellowship of the college. He graduated B.A. in 1660 and M.A. in 1663 (incorporated at Cambridge in 1664), B.D. in 1674, and D.D. in 1695.

In 1669, together with those of several other Cornishmen, Paynter's fellowship was suspended by Arthur Bury, the college rector and a devout Devonian, on the grounds that Paynter had been elected to one of the fellowships earmarked for candidates from Devon. In spite of this rebuff, in 1685 Paynter gave £100 to Exeter College. The same year he faced scandal when a child was left on his doorstep in college and was claimed to be his; it was later revealed that John Jago, a disaffected undergraduate expelled by Paynter for debauchery, had tried to wreak revenge. It was not until 1686, that Paynter actually vacated his fellowship, having been appointed to the college living of Wootton, Northamptonshire.

Paynter married twice. The date of his first marriage is uncertain, but it was possibly about the time of his appointment to Wootton rectory; his wife was Mary (1657–1695), daughter of John Conant who had been rector of Exeter College during the interregnum, and his wife, Elizabeth (daughter of Edward Reynolds). When probate was granted on Mary's first husband Matthew Poole's will, on 15 March 1690, Mary was already married to Paynter. Mary died on 7 May 1695 and was buried at Wootton near her children, William and Elizabeth. Paynter married secondly on 16 May 1695, at Preston in Northamptonshire, Sarah, daughter of Francis Duncombe of Broughton, Buckinghamshire.

On 15 August 1690, Paynter was elected by a depleted Fellowship to the Rectorship of Exeter College, on the deprivation of Arthur Bury. Bury appealed to the Court of the King's Bench, which granted him management of the college until a definite decision on the legality of Bury's dismissal was made. The Exeter fellowship was divided by the decision of the Bench; both Bury's opponents and his supporters attempted to run the college. The 'great Exeter schism' resulted in double elections to fellowships. The resulting disorder was not put right until 1694, when the House of Lords confirmed Paynter as rector after reversing the decision of the King's Bench. He was Vice-Chancellor of Oxford University in 1698 and 1699, and held the Rectorship until his death.

Paynter died on 18 February 1716; having retained the rectory of Wootton until that time, and he was buried there on 22 February. His second wife, who survived him, died on 22 September 1725, and was buried at Ilsington, Devon. It is uncertain if they had children.

== Sources ==
- Courtney, William Prideaux. "Paynter, William" . Dictionary of National Biography. Vol. 44. pp. 129–130.

Academic offices
Preceded by Arthur Bury	Rector of Exeter College, Oxford; 1690–1716	Succeeded by Matthew Hole
Preceded by John Meare	Vice-Chancellor of Oxford University; 1698–1700	Succeeded by Roger Mander
