= Newquay =

Town in Cornwall, England

Newquay: Cornish: Tewynblustri
- Town
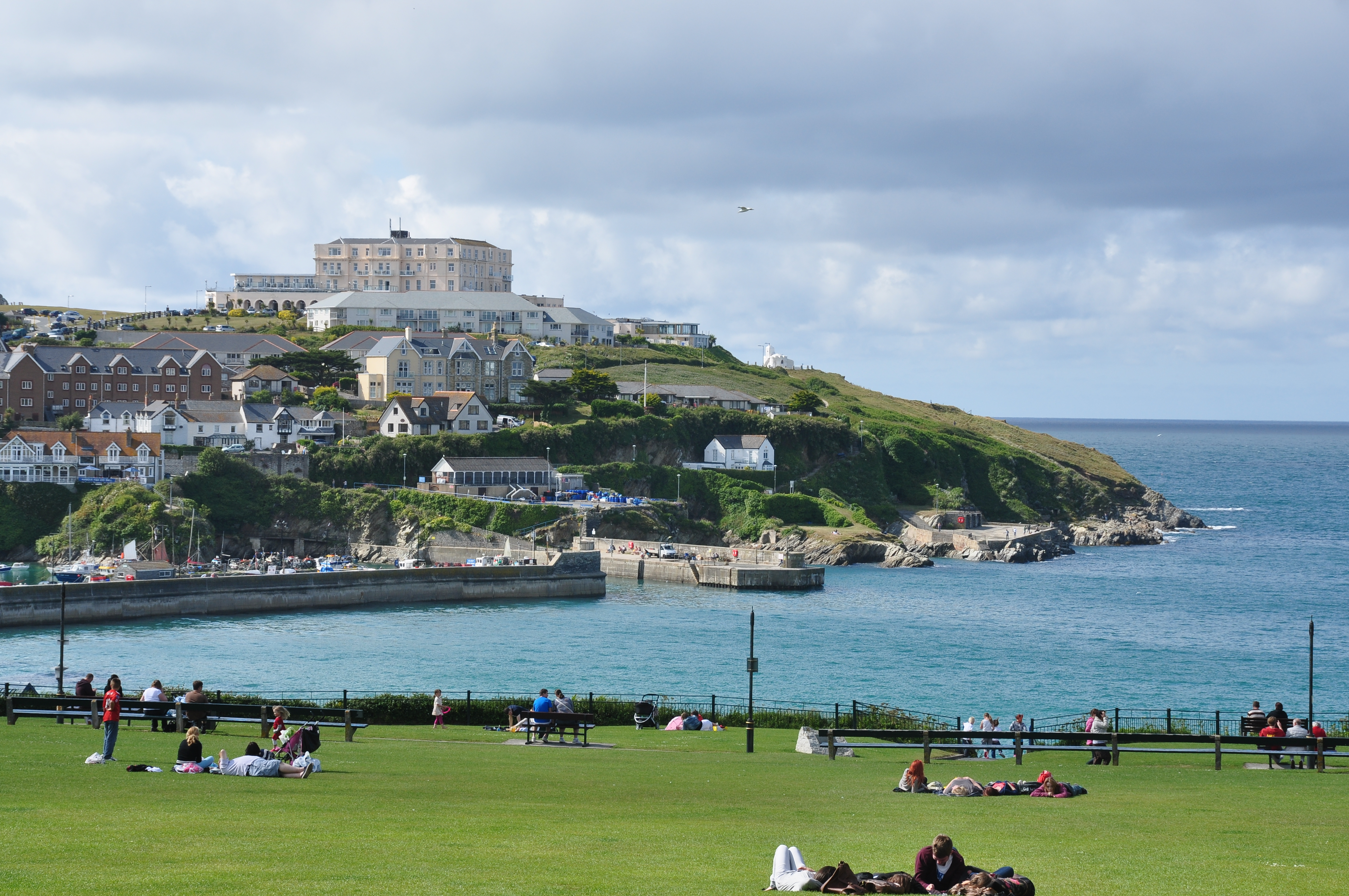
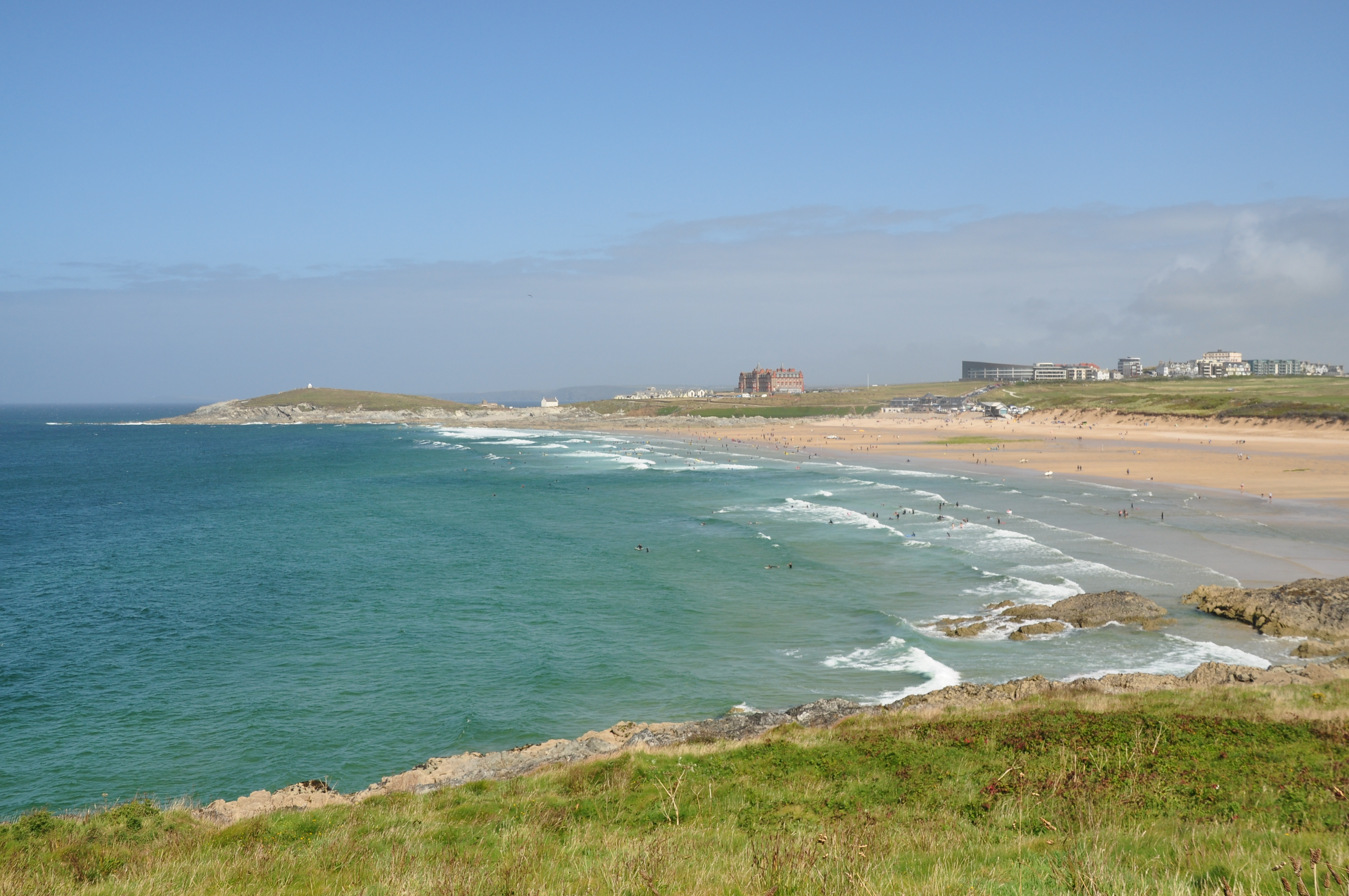
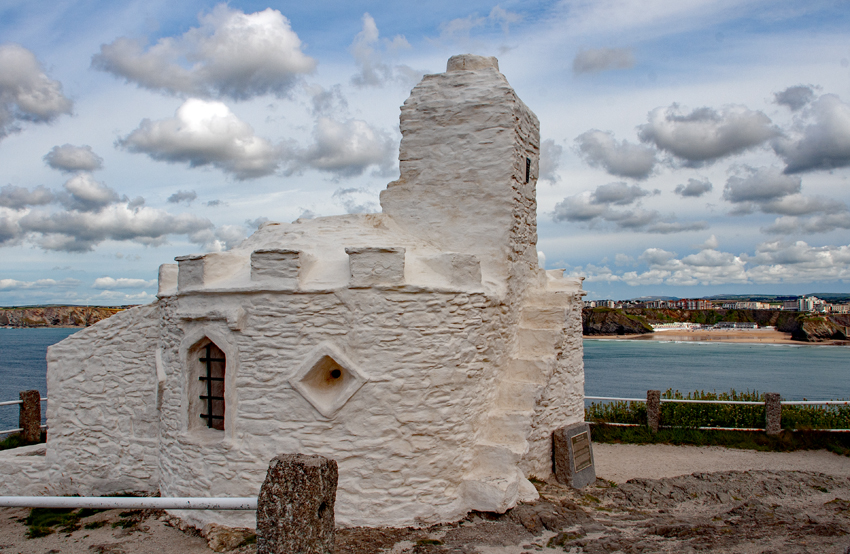
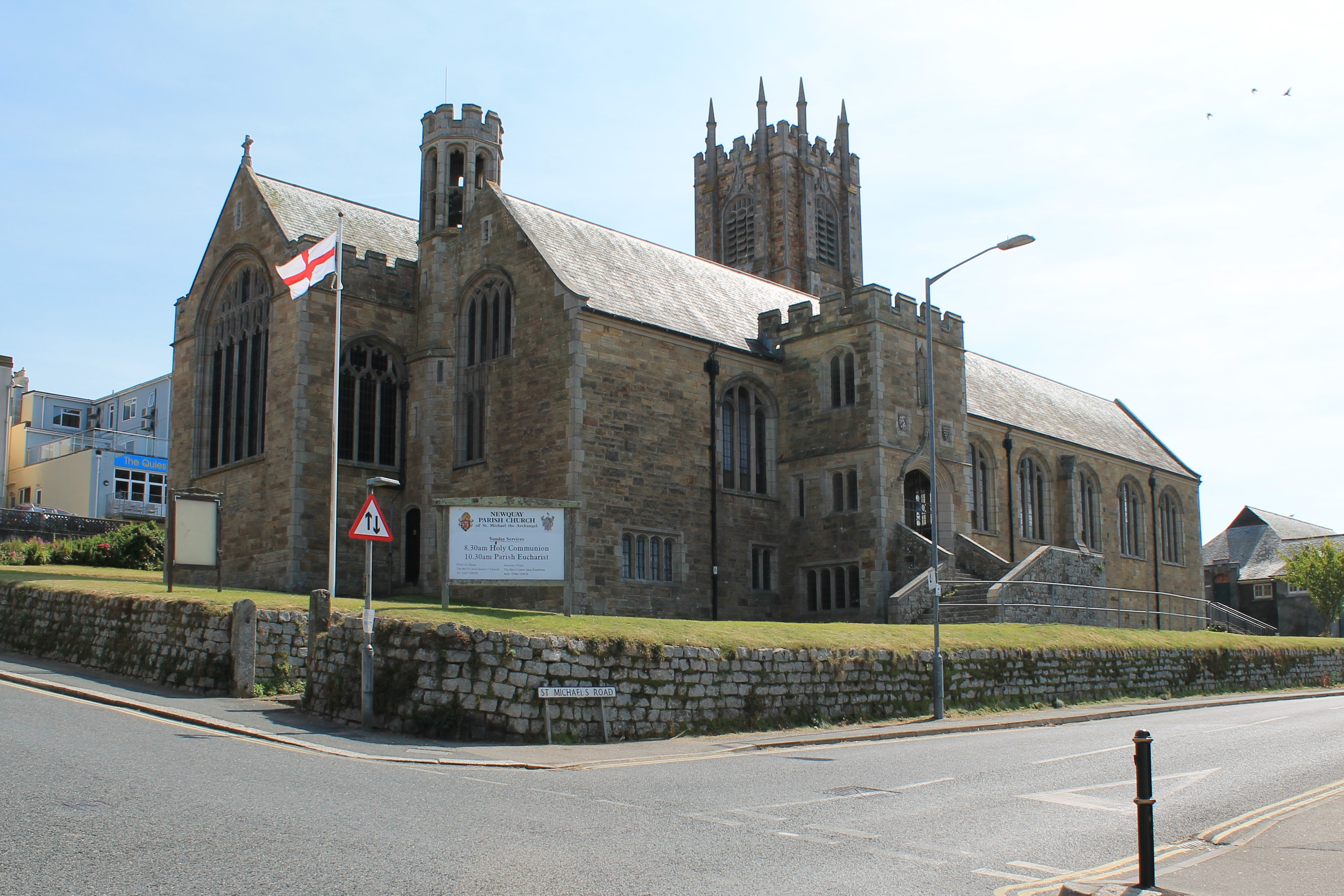
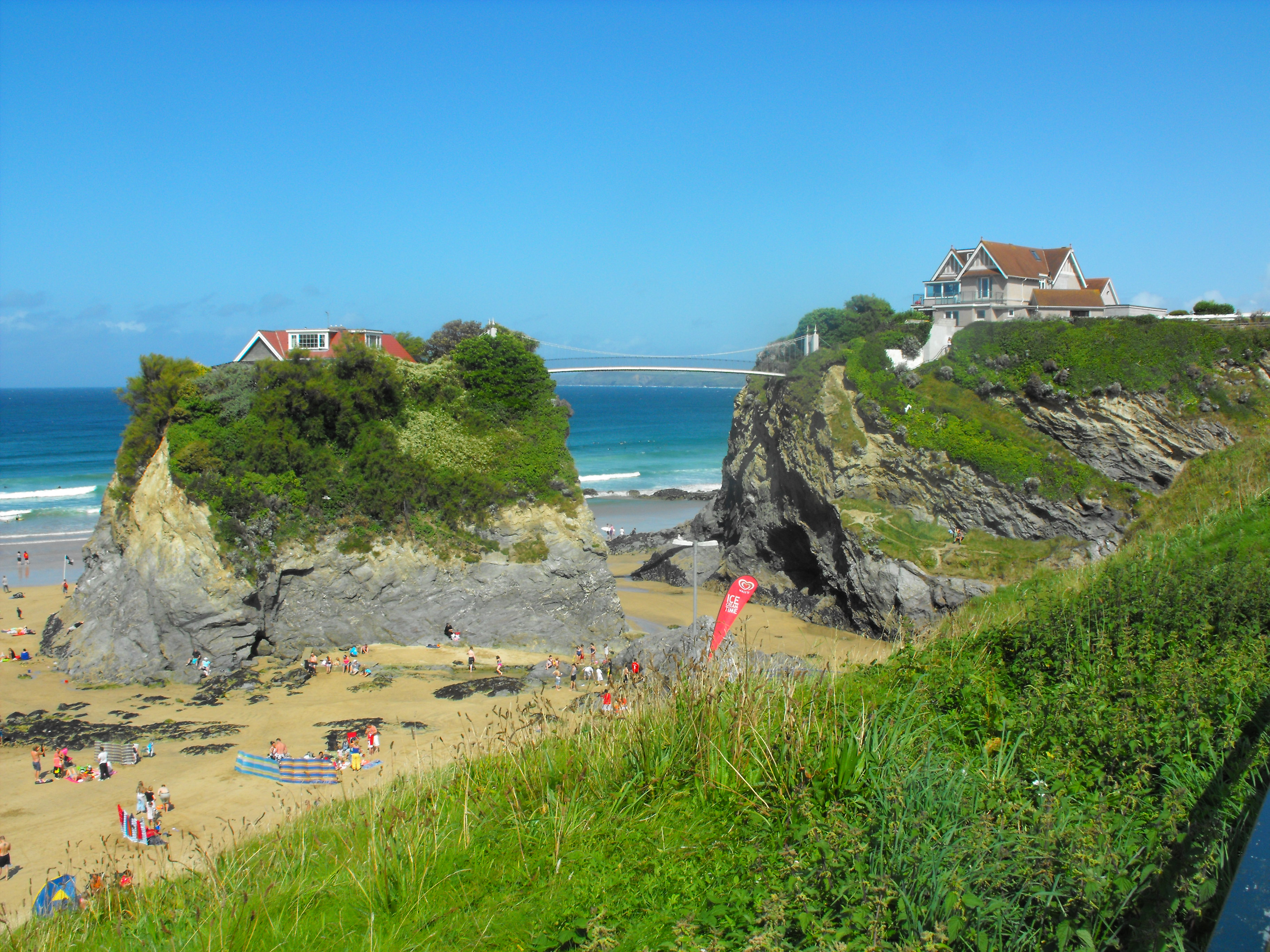
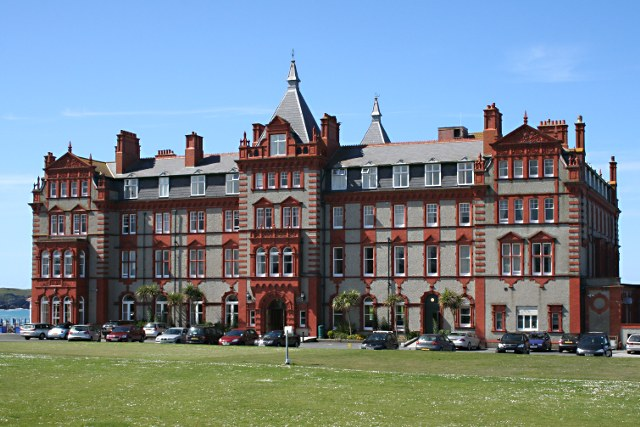
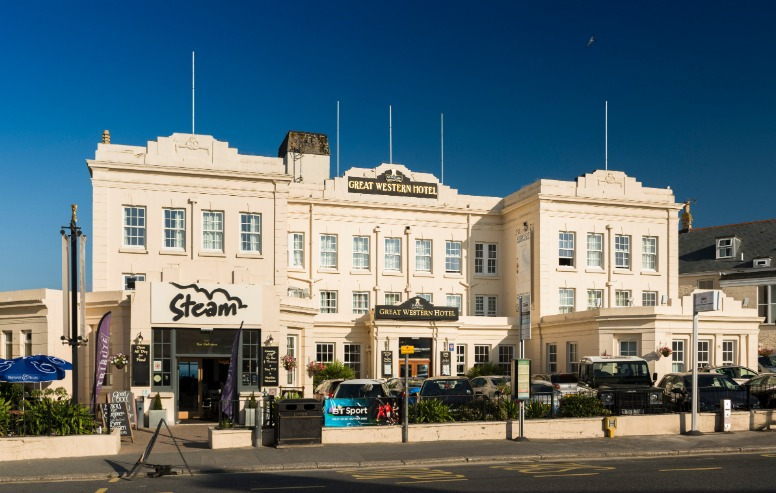
- View of the harbour from the Killacourt Fistral Beach The Huers House Parish Church The Island house The Headland Hotel Great Western Hotel

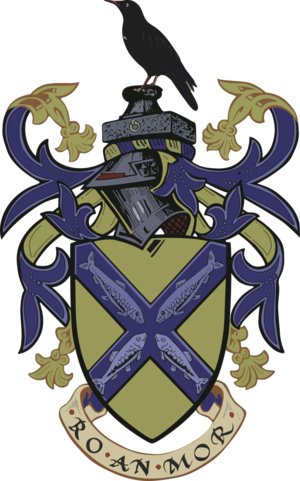
- Coat of arms

- Location within Cornwall
- Interactive map of Newquay
- Area: 2.557 sq mi (6.62 km^{2})
- Population: 23,626 (Parish, 2021); 24,545 (Built up area, 2021)
  - Density: 9,240/sq mi (3,570/km^{2})
- OS grid reference: SW815615
- Civil parish: Newquay
- Unitary authority: Cornwall
- Ceremonial county: Cornwall
- Region: South West
- Country: England
- Sovereign state: United Kingdom
- Post town: NEWQUAY
- Postcode district: TR7, TR8
- Dialling code: 01637
- Police: Devon and Cornwall
- Fire: Cornwall
- Ambulance: South Western
- UK Parliament: St Austell and Newquay
- Website: newquay.gov.uk

Newquay (/ˈnjuːki/ NEW-kee; Cornish: Tewynblustri [tɛʊɪnˈblʏstriː]) is a town on the north coast in Cornwall, England, United Kingdom. It is a civil parish, seaside resort, regional centre for aerospace industries with an airport and a spaceport, and a fishing port on the North Atlantic coast, approximately 12 miles (19 km) north of Truro and 20 miles (32 km) west of Bodmin.

The town is bounded to the south by the River Gannel and its associated salt marsh, and to the north-east by the Porth Valley. The western edge of the town meets the Atlantic at Fistral Bay. The town has been expanding inland (south) since the former fishing village of New Quay began to grow in the second half of the nineteenth century.

At the 2021 census the population of the parish was 23,626 and the population of the built up area as defined by the Office for National Statistics was 24,545.

== History ==
=== Prehistoric period ===
There are some pre-historic burial mounds and an embankment on the area now known as The Barrowfields, 400 m (440 yd) from Trevelgue. There were once up to fifteen barrows, but now only a few remain. Excavations here have revealed charred cooking pots and a coarse pottery burial urn containing remains of a Bronze Age chieftain, who was buried here up to 3,500 years ago.

In 1987, evidence of a Bronze Age village was found at Trethellan Farm, a site that overlooks the River Gannel.

The first signs of settlement in the Newquay region consist of a late Iron Age hill fort/industrial centre which exploited the nearby abundant resources (including deposits of iron) and the superior natural defences provided by Trevelgue Head. It is claimed that occupation of the site was continuous from the 3rd century BC to the 5th or 6th century AD. A Dark Ages house was later built on the head.

=== Domesday Book ===
The settlement which is now known as Newquay was not mentioned in Domesday Book, although a parcel of land was recorded at Treninnick, which is now part of suburban Newquay. Treninnick was then part of the manor of Coswarth and consisted of one virgate (value 15d) [30 acres (12 hectares)] with five sheep. The village of Crantock is the only other recognisable name in the Newquay area also recorded in Domesday Book, (as "Langoroch").

=== Funds to build a 'new quay' ===
In 1439, Edmund Lacey, Bishop of Exeter granted an indulgence to build a new quay from which the town would later derive its modern name. However, this appeal did not succeed, and the harbour remained largely undeveloped until the early 17th century, although it is thought to have had a succession of short wooden piers since the 15th century, and possibly before that.

=== Medieval to Early Modern period ===
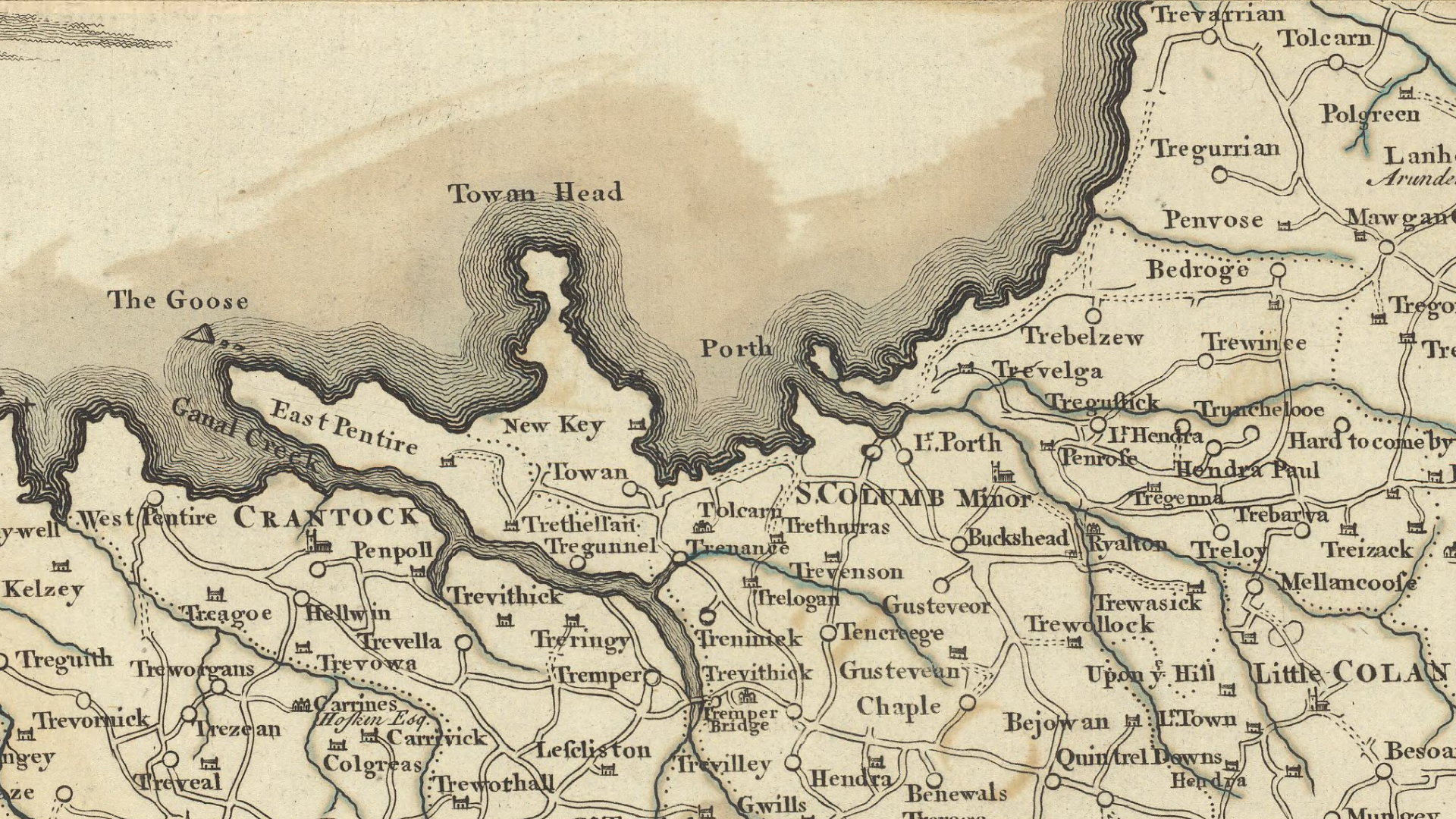
The settlements of Towan and 'New Key'

The origins of modern Newquay can be traced back to the medieval period to a small cluster of cottages known as "Towan," located where the Central Inn now stands. About 200 metres (660 ft) away was another settlement called "New Quay," referring to a small harbour within the Manor of Towan Blystra. Despite occasional confusion, "Towan Blystra" is not a Cornish equivalent of Newquay, and there is no historical record of the name "Newquay" being rendered in Cornish. The two settlements were connected by a track that eventually became today's Fore Street. The local economy at the time relied primarily on fishing, agriculture, and some mining activity

The earliest mention of a fish market in the area dates back to 1571, found in the Arundell papers. It is believed that this market may have been located in what is now Central Square, though fish trading also likely took place directly at the quay and in nearby cellars. The public house later known as 'The Central' (rebuilt in 1859) became a hub of local trade, with farmers parking wagons of grain in the square and conducting business inside the inn.

According to the accounts and financial reports of the Arundell papers from 1575, there is a mention of 'fysh bought at Newkaye,' which is likely one of the earliest recorded references to Newquay.

Richard Carew's Survey of Cornwall, published in 1602, includes the lines: "Neyther may I omit newe Kaye, a place in the North coast of this Hundred, so called, because in former times, the neighbours attempted, to supplie the defect of nature, by Art, in making there a Kay, for the Rode of shipping, which conceyt they still retayne, though want of means in themselves, or the place, have left the effect in Nubibus [unfulfilled]."

In 1615, Thomas Stuer, who was Lord of the Manor, applied for permission to build a single pier, and the development of the modern harbour then began.

=== The Huer's Hut ===
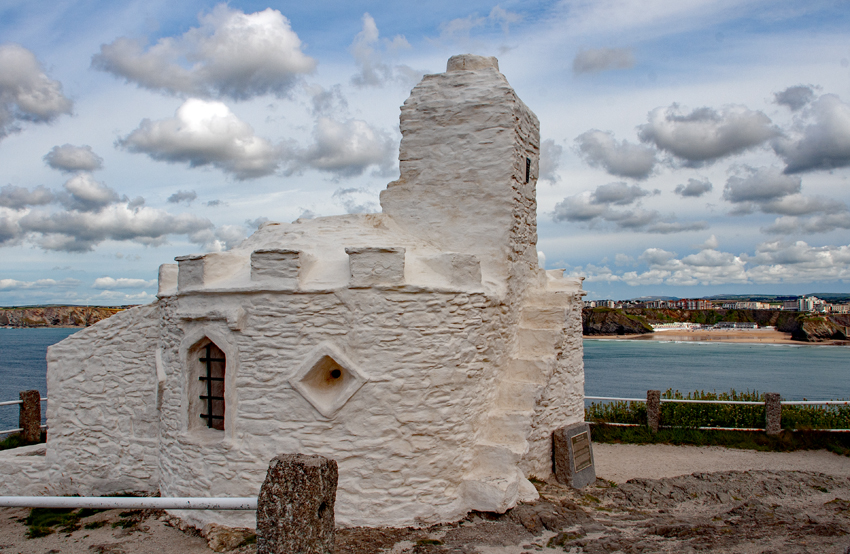
Huer's hut, Newquay

The Huer's Hut at Newquay, Cornwall served as a lookout point from which a man known as a huer could keep watch for the arrival of the pilchards. They could be discerned by the water turning a dark reddish-brown and by the flocks of seagulls which dived down to feed on the fish. The huer would announce the arrival by shouting "hevva, hevva" or through the use of a trumpet after which he would direct the townsfolk to the fish by waving tree branches above his head. The word huer has the same derivation as the "hue" in hue and cry, after this action.

The Huer's Hut at Newquay has been described as "a particularly fine late mediaeval specimen". The listed building description states that the current structure dates from the late 18th and early 19th centuries, though a plaque on the structure claims 14th-century origins. The plaque also states that the structure may have been used at an earlier time as a hermitage and lighthouse.

The structure was restored in 1836, at which point the fireplace may have been significantly altered. It received protection as a listed building (under the name "Huer's House") on 24 October 1951 and is currently categorised as grade II*

=== Central Inn ===
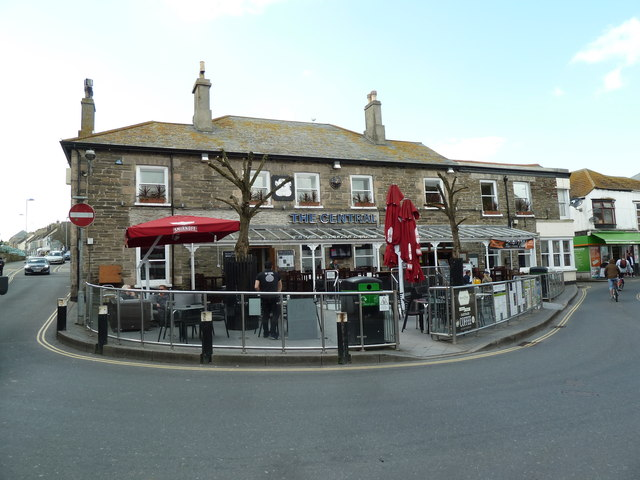
Central Inn in 2014

The origins of the original inn on the site of the present Central Inn are unclear. An inn was recorded on this site in 1755, which was probably built of freestone and topped with a thatched roof, later slate. It served as an early place of trade. In her publication "Old Newquay," Sarah Teague Husband described the inn in the 1850s as being "two or three hundred years old" and in a state of disrepair,.

The inn was rebuilt in 1859, and was known as the Commercial Inn until early in the 20th century.

=== Dr William Borlase visit in 1755 ===
Dr William Borlase, who was a Cornish antiquarian and the Rector of Ludgvan, visited Towan Blystra in 1755 during a tour of Cornwall. He wrote:

"Passed the Ganel and went about a mile further to a place of about twelve houses called Towan Blystra, a furlong further to the New Quay in St Columb Parish, here is a little pier, the north point of which is fixed on a rock, the end in a cliff; at the eastern end there is a gap cult [cut] about 25 feet wide into the slaty rock of the cliff: This gap lets small ships into a basin which may hold about six ships of about 80 tons burthen and at spring tides has 18 feet of water in it, upon the brow of the cliff is a dwelling house and a commodious cellar lately built."

The dwelling house mentioned by Borlase is believed to be referring to 'Quay House' one of the oldest building in the town, the Newquay edition of the Homeland Handbooks book (1931) described it as having a "picturesque front and low grey roof may be observed beyond a gate marked 'Private'."

=== 19th century ===
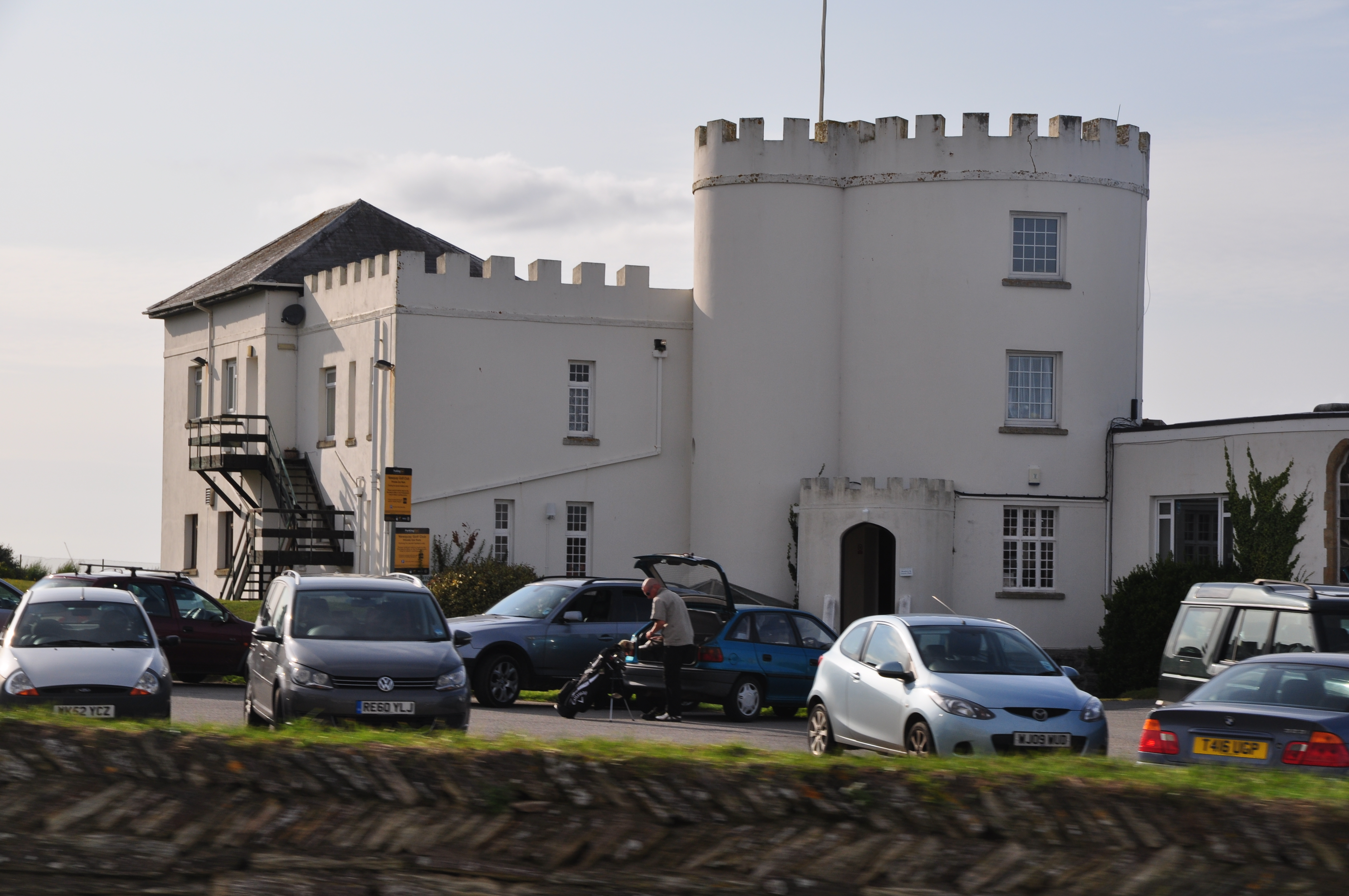
The tower, now Newquay Golf Club

The first national British census of 1801 recorded around 1,300 inhabitants in the settlement which would have include the small settlements which would become Newquay (enumerated as a village under St Columb Minor parish).

In 1832 the London-based entrepreneur Richard Lomax bought the manor of Towan Blystra. This included the small harbour at what was becoming known as New Quay.

The proposal included a description of New Quay and Towan and the unpaved track between the settlements. It also showed some buildings including an inn, (this was rebuilt in 1859 and is now known as The Central), cottages along what would become Bank Street and other structures connected with the fishing industry, such as the cellars, where the fish were dried and packed in barrels. Lomax began the construction of the north and south quay, but he died in 1837 before his harbour had been completed.

The harbour was at its most prosperous in the 25 years following its purchase in the 1870s by the Cornwall Minerals Railway. In 1872 the middle jetty was added to expand capacity.

To the north of the harbour there were fish cellars in the 19th century, where pilchards were salted and packed in casks. The two remaining areas are Fly cellars and Active cellars, although the others have disappeared.

A mansion called the Tower was built for the Molesworth family in 1835: it included a castellated tower and a private chapel as they were Roman Catholics and no church for that denomination existed in the area. The Tower later became the golf club house. After the arrival of passenger trains in June 1876, the town started to develop with many rows of private houses and hotels began to emerge.

=== Victorian hotels ===
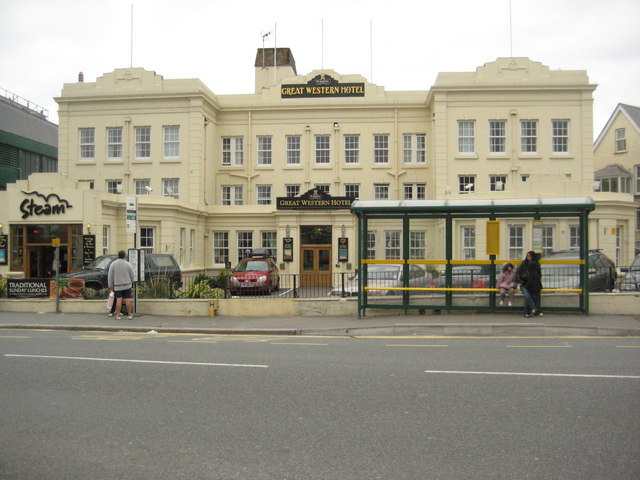
Great Western Hotel

Several major hotels were built around the end of the 19th century, the first being the Great Western Hotel which opened in 1879 on Station Road, now Cliff Road. The original hotel was enlarged and altered in the 1930s. Other early first-class hotels included the Victoria (1899), the Atlantic (1892) and the Headland (1900) near Fistral, Many smaller hotels were also being opened. Some were created around the turn of the century by converting large houses, many of which had been built originally by wealthy visitors as holiday homes, particularly along Narrowcliff.

=== Early 20th century ===
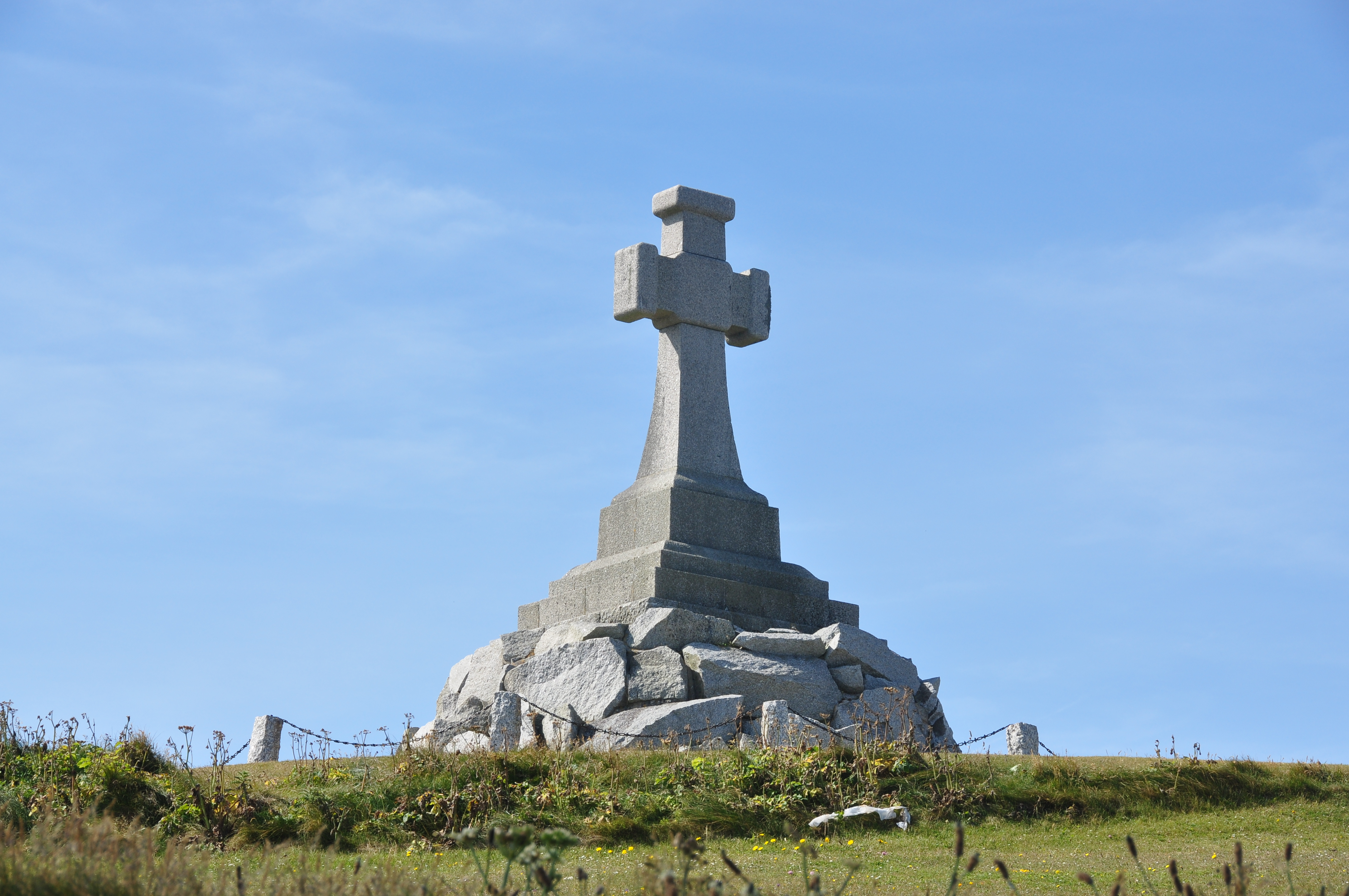
Newquay war memorial

Three churches were built early in the twentieth century, including the present day parish church of St Michael the Archangel, which was consecrated in 1911. Growth of the town eastwards soon reached the area around the railway station: Station Road became Cliff Road around 1930, and the houses beyond, along Narrowcliff, were also converted into hotels. Narrowcliff was known for a while as Narrowcliff Promenade, and then Narrowcliff Road. On some pre-war maps, it is spelt Narrowcliffe.

At the time of the First World War the last buildings at the edge of the town were a little further along present-day Narrowcliff. Post-war development saw new houses and streets built in the Chester Road area, accompanied by ribbon development along the country lane which led to St Columb Minor, some 2 miles (3 km) away. This thoroughfare was modernised and named Henver Road, also some time in the 1930s. Development continued in this direction until the Second World War, by which time much of Henver Road had houses on both sides, with considerable infilling also taking place between there and the sea.

A thriving knitting industry became established in Newquay in the early part of the 20th century. In 1905, Madame Hawke began selling machine-knitted garments in a shop in the centre of the town. Debenhams was sent a sample of her work and commissioned her as a supplier. She opened a factory in Crantock Street, which has since been converted into housing. Several competing knitting companies were also set up in the town in this period.

=== Second World War ===
Among many schools evacuated to Cornwall (notably Benenden School which occupied the Hotel Bristol), 240 boys and 20 masters of Gresham's School were evacuated to the town from Holt, Norfolk, during the Second World War, between June 1940 and March 1944. Gresham's occupied the Bay Hotel and the Pentire Hotel.

Between 1940 and 1944, the Royal Air Force used hotels in Newquay as a Ground school for aircrew Initial Training Wings No 7, No 8, and No 40. Recruits were taught basic flying theory and service protocols, and were sorted into their likely future RAF trades, such as Pilots, Observers, Navigators, Wireless operators, and air gunners. The training took place in the Highbury Hotel and men were billeted in nearby hotels.

Several hotels were requisitioned as convalescent hospitals for the Army, Air Force, and Royal Navy. These were the Atlantic Hotel, the Headland Hotel, the Hotel Victoria, the Fistral Bay Hotel and St Rumons (later renamed the Esplanade).

Only two civilians are recorded to have died by enemy action in Newquay Urban District.

=== Later 20th century ===
In the early 1950s, the last houses were built along Henver Road. After that, there was a virtually continuous building line on both sides of the main road from the other side of St Columb Minor right into the town centre. The Doublestiles estate to the north of Henver Road was also built in the early 1950s, as the name of Coronation Way indicates, and further development continued beyond, becoming the Lewarne Estate and extending the built up area to the edges of Porth.

Other areas also developed in the period between the wars were Pentire (known for a time as West Newquay) and the Trenance Valley. Other streets dating from the 1920s included St Thomas Road, which provided the approach to the town's new cottage hospital at its far end, to be followed by others in the same area near the station, such as Pargolla Road.

More recent development has been on a larger scale: until the late 1960s, a passenger arriving by train would not have seen a building by the line (with the exception of Trencreek village) until the Trenance Viaduct was reached. Today, the urban area starts a good 1.5 miles (2 km) inland from the viaduct. Other growth areas have been on the fringes of St Columb Minor and also towards the Gannel. More development beyond Treninnick, south of the Trenance Valley, has taken the urban area out as far as Lane, where more building is now under way. The Trennnick/Treloggan development, mainly in the 1970s and 1980s, included not merely housing but also an industrial estate and several large commercial outlets, including a major supermarket and a cash and carry warehouse.

=== 21st century ===
One of the worst hotel fires in Britain for many years occurred in 2007 at the Penhallow hotel, which overlooked Towan beach. Three people were killed because the hotel management had not complied with fire safety standards. The building was later demolished and replaced by a new structure.

The first phase of a new Duchy of Cornwall development began to be built in 2012 at Tregunnel Hill, which was sometimes unofficially called Surfbury after the similar Poundbury development in Dorset. It has 174 houses of traditional designs.

There is now a similar but much more substantial development in progress inland, and construction on a large site known as Nansledan ('broad valley' in Cornish) is now well under way, mainly west of the Quintrell Road. Plans were approved for the development of 800 homes at Nansledan in December 2013, but the plan now includes more than 4,000 homes, shops, a supermarket, church and a 14-classroom primary school which opened to its first pupils in September 2019. Following the example set at Tregunnel Hill, the buildings are again of traditional designs and all street names are in Cornish.

Places like Trencreek, Porth and St Columb Minor have long since become suburbs of Newquay: it had been reported that it was possible that by the 2030s, should present development trends continue, the south eastern edge of the town could stretch beyond the present boundary set by Nansledan and encompass Quintrell Downs, 3 miles (5 km) from the town centre. However, the Newquay Neighbourhood Development Plan, which was approved in a referendum held on 6 April 2019, said it was important to retain a 'green buffer' between Newquay and Quintrell Downs.

In April 2012, the Aerohub enterprise zone for aerospace businesses was set up at Newquay Airport. In September 2014, the UK's Homes and Communities Agency and the European Regional Development Fund agreed to fund the construction of a £6 million Aerohub Business Park there. A plan to launch space vehicles from a new spaceport alongside the airport moved ahead in July 2018, when a contract was signed with Virgin Orbit. The first launch from the spaceport, named Spaceport Cornwall, took place on 9 January 2023. The initial launch of the LauncherOne rocket from the carrier aircraft, Cosmic Girl, was successful but the rocket's second stage suffered an anomaly and the vehicle and payload satellites failed to reach orbit.

== Governance ==
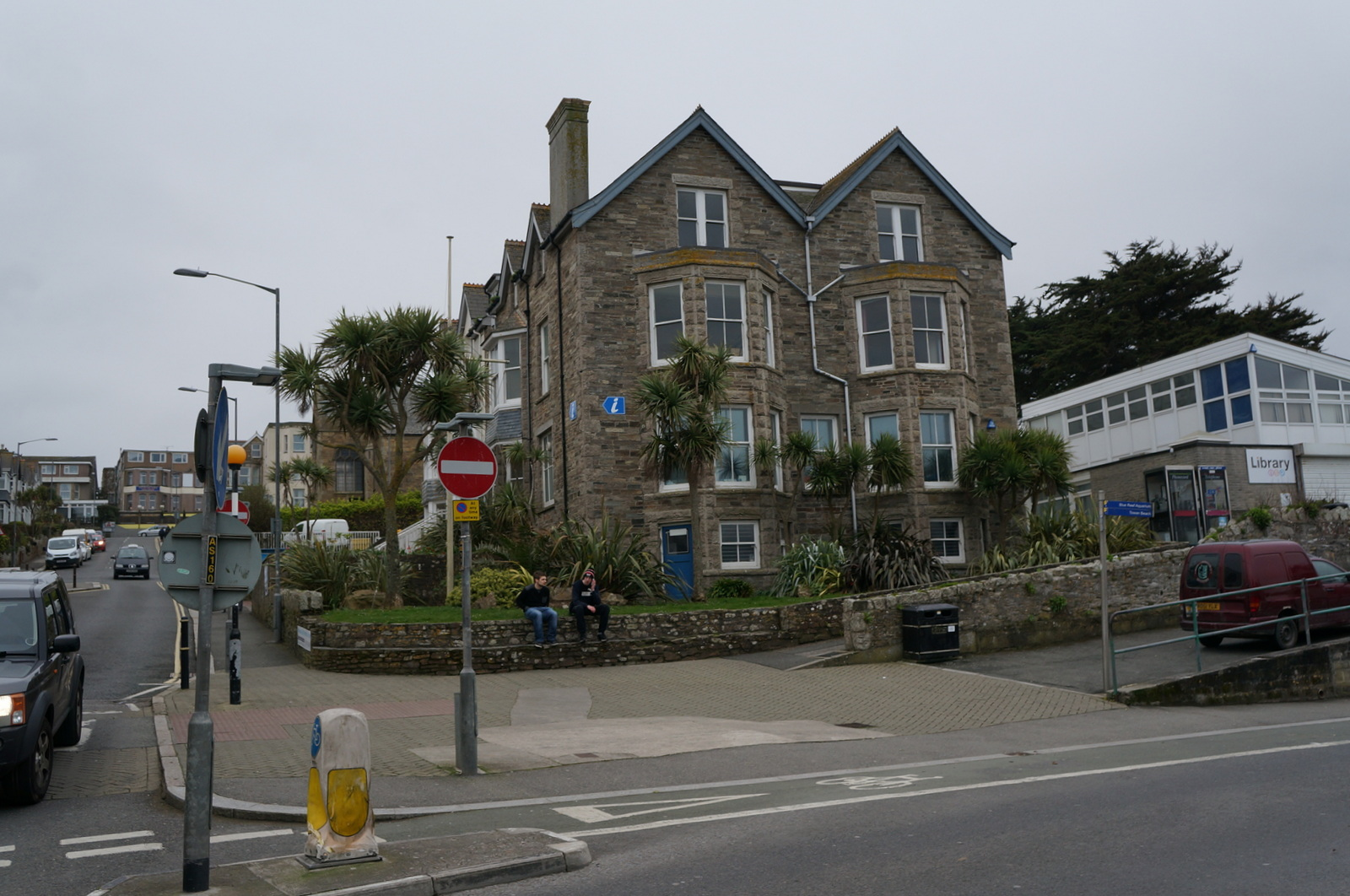
Tourist Information Office and Municipal Buildings, Marcus Hill

There are two tiers of local government covering Newquay, at parish (town) and unitary authority level: Newquay Town Council (which styles itself "Newquay Council") and Cornwall Council. The town council is based at the Municipal Buildings on Marcus Hill.

The Member of Parliament for St Austell and Newquay is Noah Law (Labour), who won the seat in 2024. The previous MP was Steve Double (Conservative) who had been MP for the constituency since it was created in 2010. He was re-elected in 2015 and 2019.

=== Administrative history ===
Newquay historically formed part of the ancient parish of St Columb Minor in the Pydarshire Hundred of Cornwall. In 1868 a Newquay local government district was established, administered by an elected local board. Such districts were reconstituted as urban districts under the Local Government Act 1894. In ecclesiastical terms, Newquay remained a chapelry of the ecclesiastical parish of St Columb Minor until 1918.

The urban district was enlarged in 1902 and 1934; the 1934 expansion included taking in the neighbouring villages of Crantock and St Columb Minor. In 1957 the urban district council moved its headquarters to the former Manor hotel on Marcus Hill, which became known as the Municipal Buildings.

Newquay Urban District was abolished in 1974 under the Local Government Act 1972, when the area became part of the new borough of Restormel. The area of the former Newquay Urban District became an unparished area as a result of the 1974 reforms. Two new parishes were subsequently created covering the former Newquay Urban District in 1983; Crantock and Newquay. The parish council for Newquay declared that parish to be a town, allowing it to take the name Newquay Town Council and letting the chairperson of the council take the title of mayor, who is currently, Drew Creek, who is the councillor for the Newquay Trenance ward.

Restormel was abolished in 2009. Cornwall County Council then took on district-level functions, making it a unitary authority, and was renamed Cornwall Council.

== Geography ==
=== Climate ===
As with the rest of the British Isles and South West England, Newquay experiences a maritime climate with cool summers and mild winters. The nearest Met Office weather station is St. Mawgan/Newquay Airport, about 3.5 miles to the north east of the town centre. Temperature extremes in the area since 1960 vary from 31.3 °C (88.3 °F) in June 1976 and August 1995 down to −9.0 °C (15.8 °F) during January 1987.

Climate data for Newquay Airport WMO ID: 03817; coordinates 50°26′19″N 4°59′47″W; elevation: 103 m (338 ft); 1991–2020 normals, extremes 1960–present (Note: Extreme temperature records were measured at NQY from 1960–2008, since 2008 extremes and average extremes were recorded at Newquay Weather Station.)
Month	Jan	Feb	Mar	Apr	May	Jun	Jul	Aug	Sep	Oct	Nov	Dec	Year
Record high °C (°F)	15.1 (59.2)	18.4 (65.1)	22.2 (72.0)	24.3 (75.7)	27.9 (82.2)	31.3 (88.3)	31.4 (88.5)	32.4 (90.3)	29.9 (85.8)	26.5 (79.7)	19.2 (66.6)	16.5 (61.7)	32.4 (90.3)
Mean maximum °C (°F)	13.0 (55.4)	13.3 (55.9)	16.8 (62.2)	18.9 (66.0)	22.6 (72.7)	25.0 (77.0)	25.8 (78.4)	24.0 (75.2)	22.5 (72.5)	20.7 (69.3)	16.4 (61.5)	13.6 (56.5)	27.3 (81.1)
Mean daily maximum °C (°F)	9.0 (48.2)	9.0 (48.2)	10.4 (50.7)	12.5 (54.5)	15.1 (59.2)	17.5 (63.5)	19.1 (66.4)	19.1 (66.4)	17.7 (63.9)	14.6 (58.3)	11.7 (53.1)	9.7 (49.5)	13.8 (56.8)
Daily mean °C (°F)	6.7 (44.1)	6.6 (43.9)	7.7 (45.9)	9.4 (48.9)	12.0 (53.6)	14.5 (58.1)	16.3 (61.3)	16.4 (61.5)	14.9 (58.8)	12.2 (54.0)	9.4 (48.9)	7.4 (45.3)	11.1 (52.0)
Mean daily minimum °C (°F)	4.3 (39.7)	4.1 (39.4)	5.1 (41.2)	6.4 (43.5)	8.9 (48.0)	11.5 (52.7)	13.5 (56.3)	13.7 (56.7)	12.1 (53.8)	9.8 (49.6)	7.1 (44.8)	5.1 (41.2)	8.5 (47.3)
Mean minimum °C (°F)	-0.0 (32.0)	0.7 (33.3)	0.7 (33.3)	3.1 (37.6)	5.5 (41.9)	8.6 (47.5)	10.9 (51.6)	10.6 (51.1)	8.5 (47.3)	5.4 (41.7)	4.2 (39.6)	1.5 (34.7)	−1.6 (29.1)
Record low °C (°F)	−9.0 (15.8)	−8.5 (16.7)	−8.5 (16.7)	−2.1 (28.2)	1.0 (33.8)	2.7 (36.9)	7.4 (45.3)	7.2 (45.0)	4.9 (40.8)	−0.1 (31.8)	−4.2 (24.4)	−6.7 (19.9)	−9 (16)
Average precipitation mm (inches)	109.0 (4.29)	83.2 (3.28)	68.8 (2.71)	65.7 (2.59)	58.4 (2.30)	63.1 (2.48)	71.5 (2.81)	71.3 (2.81)	77.2 (3.04)	108.0 (4.25)	127.7 (5.03)	115.7 (4.56)	1,019.4 (40.13)
Average precipitation days (≥ 1.0 mm)	16.4	13.3	12.4	11.1	9.8	10.1	11.4	12.1	11.5	15.2	17.8	17.1	158.1
Average relative humidity (%) (daily average)	86	85	84	82	82	84	85	85	85	86	86	86	85
Average dew point °C (°F)	4 (39)	4 (39)	5 (41)	6 (43)	8 (46)	11 (52)	13 (55)	13 (55)	11 (52)	9 (48)	7 (45)	5 (41)	8 (46)
Mean monthly sunshine hours	67.8	91.1	133.3	194.3	224.2	219.5	207.5	196.7	167.1	119.8	75.1	61.6	1,758
Source 1: Met Office
Source 2: Royal Dutch Meteorological Institute Source #3: Newquay Weather Station Source 4: Time and Date

=== Geology ===
The bedrock underlying Newquay is the Devonian age Meadfoot Group, a succession of interbedded mudstones, siltstones and sandstones, with occasional beds of limestone. Quaternary age deposits of blown sand cover the bedrock in the western part of the town. Some mineralisation associated with the Cornubian granite batholith that intrudes into much of the peninsular is found in the western part of the town near Fistral Beach, in the form of lodes of lead and silver minerals.

== Economy ==
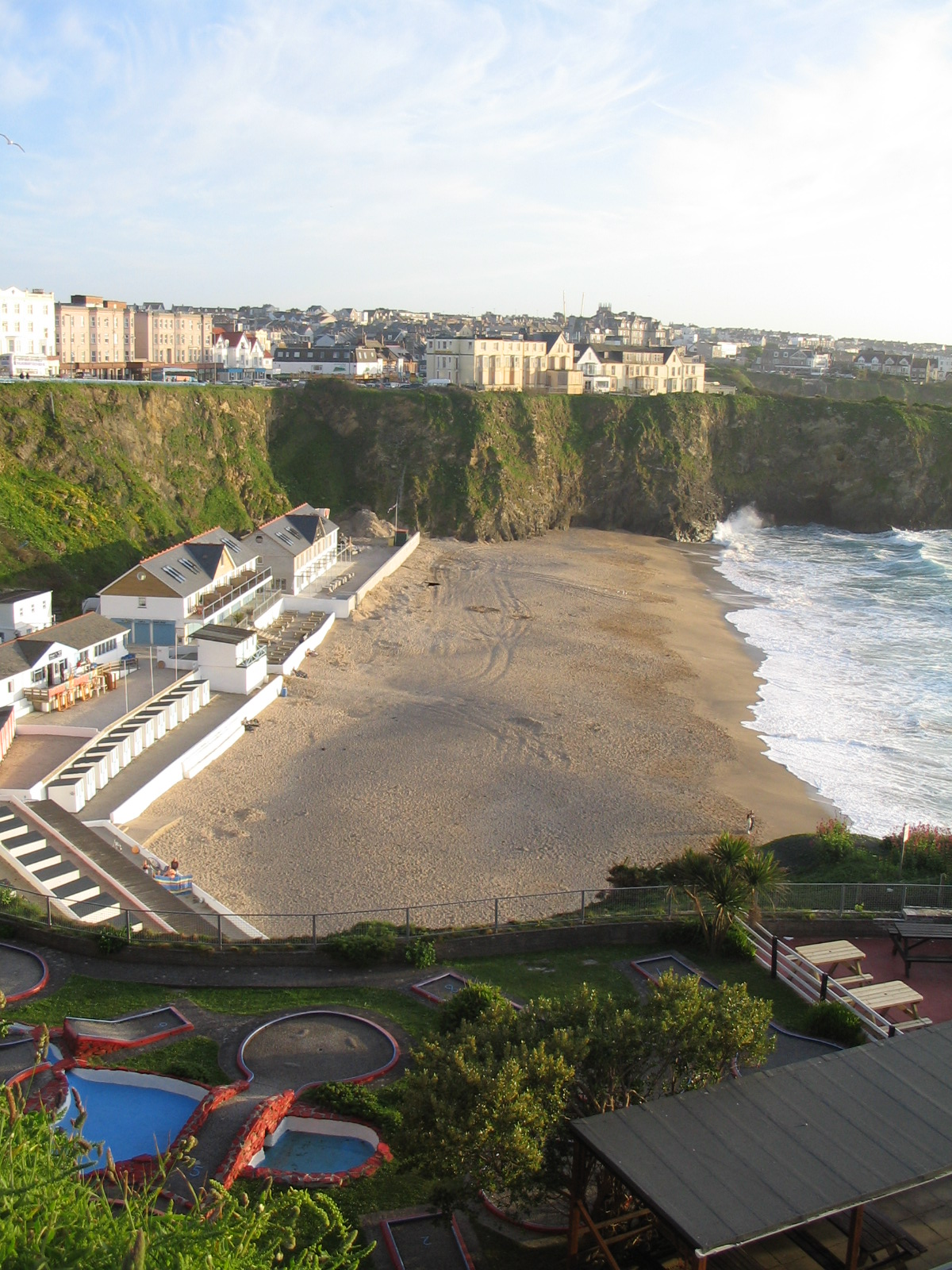
Tolcarne Beach

=== Tourism ===
Newquay has been a major tourist destination for more than a century, principally on account of its coastline and nine long and accessible sandy beaches. These include Fistral, which could claim to the best known surfing beach in the British Isles. Around 25,000 people live in Newquay, but the population can increase to 100,000 or more in the summer because Newquay has a large stock of holiday accommodation.

During the 20th century, the town developed in sections, Trenance Leisure Gardens are in a wooded, formerly marshy valley on the quieter edge of Newquay, stretching down to the Gannel Estuary. From the Edwardian era it provided recreation for tourists with walks, tennis courts and a bowling green. The gardens are spanned by a stone railway viaduct which was rebuilt just before the Second World War. The boating lake was dug during the depression of the 1930s, as a work creation scheme. In the late 1960s, further enterprises were established by the council, including mini-golf, a swimming pool, the Little Western Railway miniature railway which opened in 1968 and Newquay Zoo, which opened in 1969.

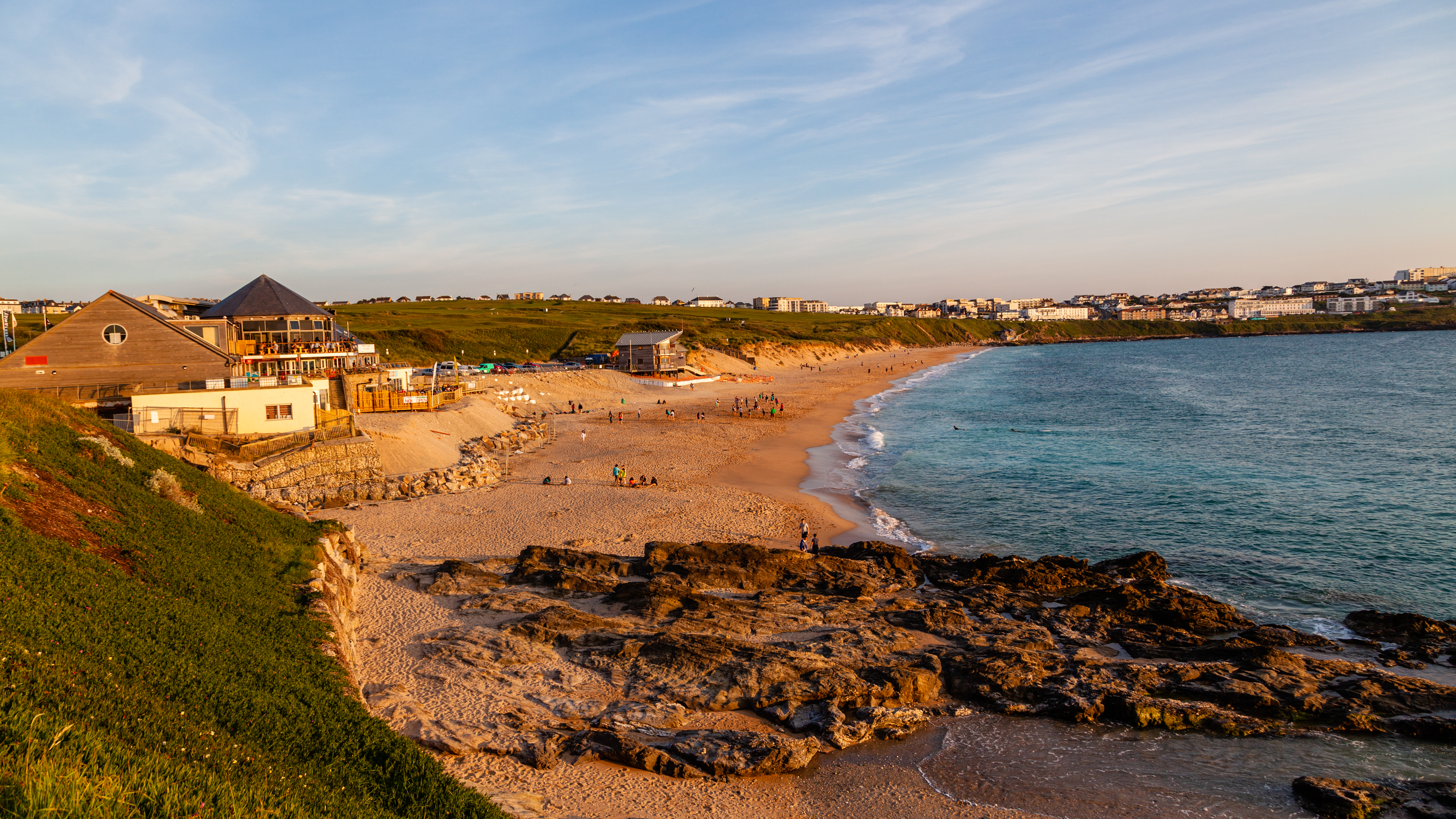
Fistral Beach

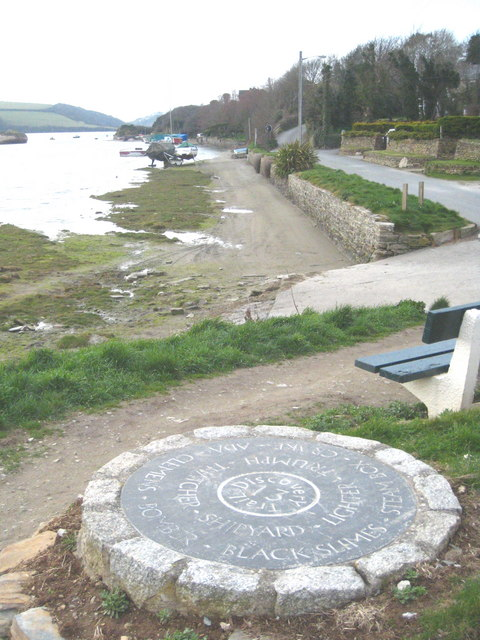
Disc number 13 beside the River Gannel on the Newquay Discovery Trail

Newquay was also known for the "Run to the Sun" event, which began on Fistral Beach in 1987 and then took place for many years during the public holiday on the last weekend in May at Trevelgue Holiday Park. People visited the town in Volkswagen camper vans, Volkswagen Beetles and other custom cars. The last RTTS took place in 2014, but in 2023, it was announced that the event would return on 27 May to a new site at St Mawgan, just outside Newquay.

Other events in recent times have included the large Boardmasters music festival, which attracts another 50,000 visitors over one weekend in early August and is held on sites at Watergate Bay (outside the urban area) and Fistral Beach. Cornwall Pride moved to Newquay from Truro in 2017, and this took place in 2018 on the last Saturday in August.

The 630 mi (1,014 km) South West Coast Path runs through the town.

==== Town trail ====
Newquay Discovery Trail is made up of 14 Cornish slate discs, each 1 metre (39 inches) in diameter, sunk into the ground at strategic points around the town. Each of the discs features a series of 'conundrum' words carved by sculptor Peter Martin. The trail starts in the centre of town at the Killacourt.

=== Spaceport ===
Newquay has obtained a licence to operate as a spaceport, called Spaceport Cornwall. A decision had been expected about the sites of UK spaceports in the summer of 2017, but the additional general election in June 2017 delayed necessary legislation for a time. Cornwall's bid was supported by Cornwall Council and Cornwall & Isles of Scilly Local Enterprise Partnership. The proposal also included the related Cornish space tracking station at Goonhilly, which is near Helston in south Cornwall. On 16 July 2018, a new partnership was announced with Virgin Orbit to create the spaceport, with the intention of launching satellites from Newquay within three years. On the same day, the government confirmed that a grant worth £2 million would be available to developing spaceports. The planned first satellite from Newquay, Kernow Sat 1, was to measure ocean pollution and deforestation and was planned to be launched in summer 2022 (in the end, Kernow Sat 1 was not present on the first launch from Spaceport Cornwall in 2023). On 24 February 2022, the then Business Secretary, Kwasi Kwarteng, formally launched the construction of a £5.6 million Centre for Space Technologies alongside the Spaceport, and the new Centre is expected to create 150 jobs. The first, unsuccessful, attempt to launch satellites took place on 9 January 2023.

== Transport ==
=== Railway ===
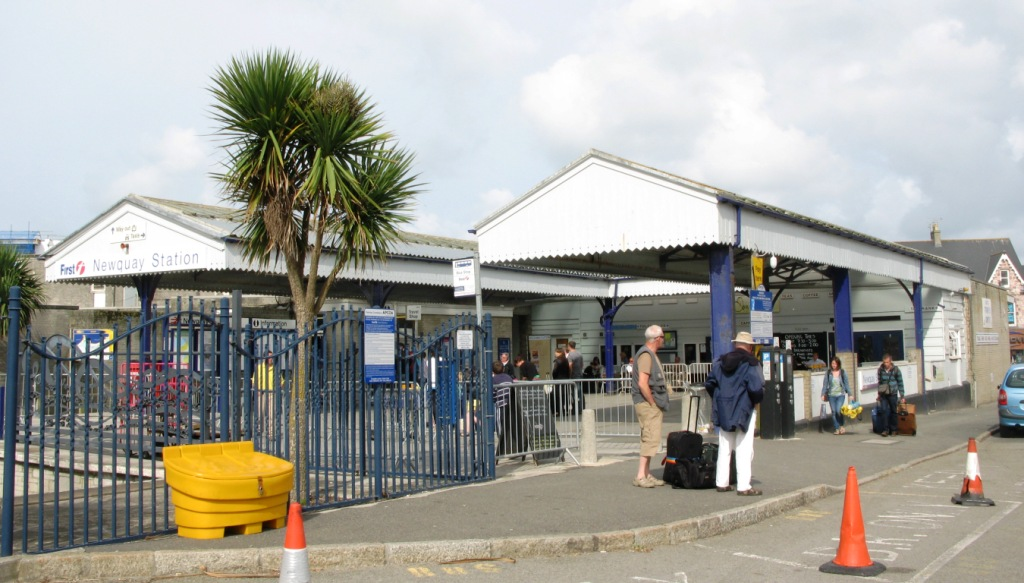
Newquay railway station

Newquay railway station is the terminus of the Atlantic Coast Line from Par. The railway was originally built as a mineral line in the 1840s and ran mainly around the fringes of the built-up area, as it was then, to the harbour. A passenger service followed on 20 June 1876, and from then on the town developed quickly as a resort. The station is close to the beaches on the eastern side of the town centre.

Newquay has daily direct services to and from Plymouth, Exeter and London between May and September. It is the only branch line terminus in Britain still served by scheduled intercity trains. Passenger services are currently operated under government contract by Great Western Railway, whose owner is FirstGroup.

==== History ====
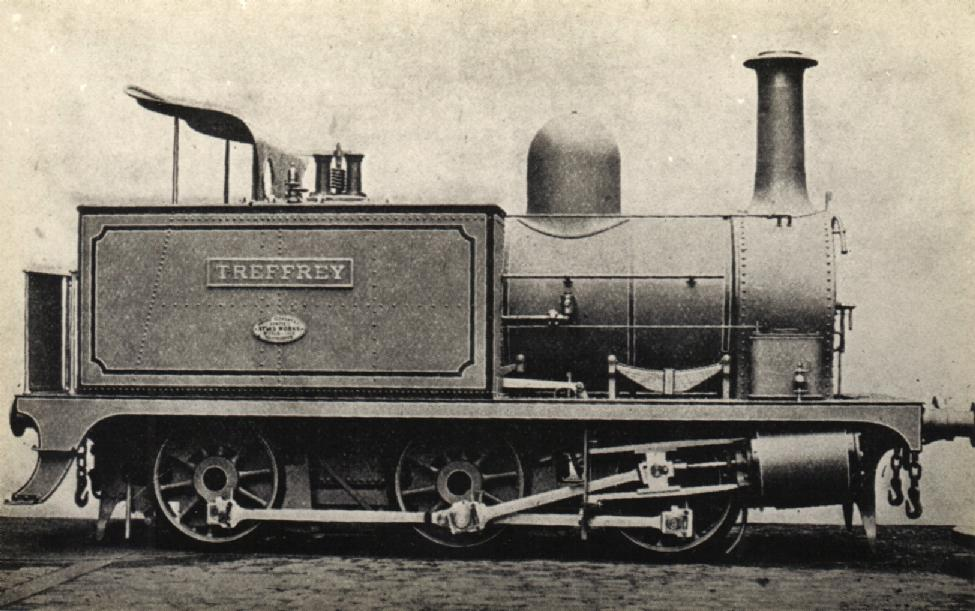
Cornwall Minerals Railway 060T Treffrey

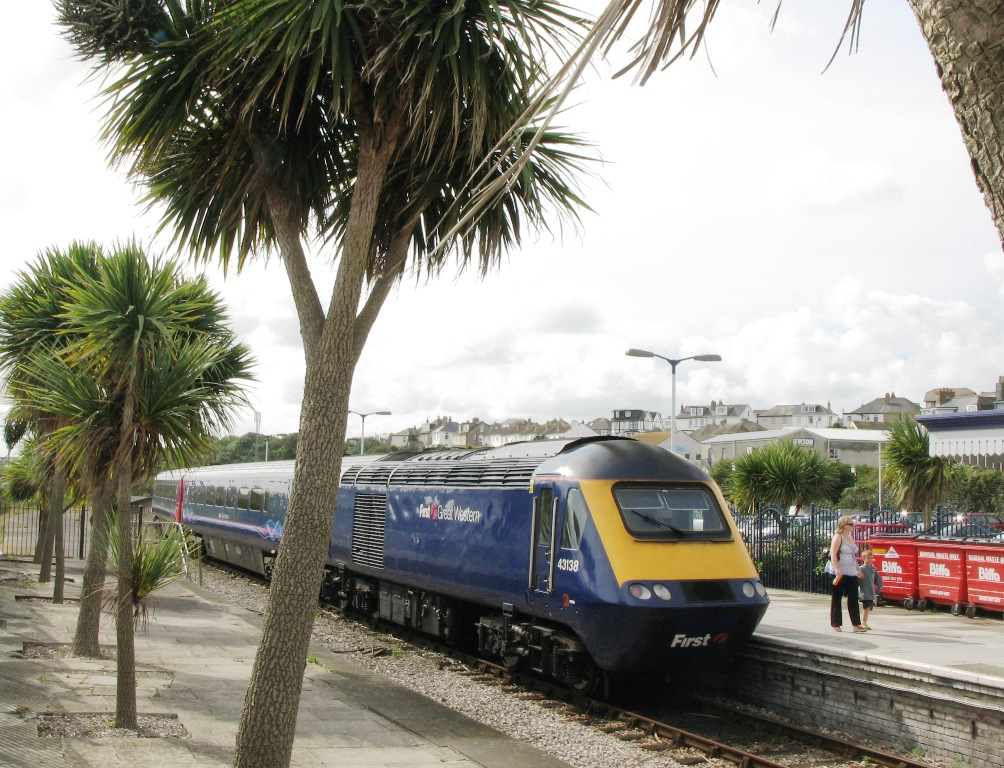
First Great Western 43138 stands at Newquay railway station

The goods line which would be acquired later by the Cornwall Minerals Railway was opened in 1846 from inland mines to the harbour, and was worked by horses. Parts of the old line from the present station to the harbour are still in existence: the most obvious section is a broad footpath from opposite the station in Cliff Road to East Street, known locally as the "tram track", and complete with a very railway-style overbridge. From East Street, the line continued towards the harbour along the present-day Manor Road.

The last trains ran through to Newquay Harbour in 1925, but general goods traffic continued to reach Newquay railway station until 1964. The passenger station and its approaches were enlarged more than once, with additional carriage sidings being built at Newquay in the 1930s. The originally wooden viaduct just outside the station, which crosses the Trenance Valley, was rebuilt in 1874 to allow locomotives to run over the structure and then again just before World War II to carry double track, which extended until 1964 for approximately 1,500 m (0.93 mi) to Tolcarn Junction. The line is now single again, but the width of the viaduct is still obvious.

Tolcarn Junction was the point where a second passenger route left the Par line between 1906 and 1963. This branch ran to Chacewater, west of Truro, via Perranporth and St Agnes, and provided through trains to Truro and Falmouth.

Two of the three former platforms were taken out of use in 1987.

==== Mid Cornwall Metro ====
The Mid Cornwall Metro received provisional approval for government funding worth almost £50 million on 18 January 2023, and the project was approved by Cornwall Council in December 2023, on condition that budgets are kept under control.

A second platform was restored at Newquay in early 2025 and there will be other improvements to the terminus as well as upgraded signalling and an additional crossing place (a section of double track) at Tregoss Moor, between St Columb Road and Roche stations. This crossing place, 400 metres (0.25 mi) long, was laid during a month-long closure of the line in March 2025. The MCM will provide a clockface hourly service between Newquay, Par, St Austell, Truro and Falmouth Docks.

Work is now under way. The frequency of trains to Par had been due to be doubled to hourly in May 2025, but this improvement has been delayed until later in the year. Newquay services are set to be extended to Truro and Falmouth in 2026.

=== Airport ===
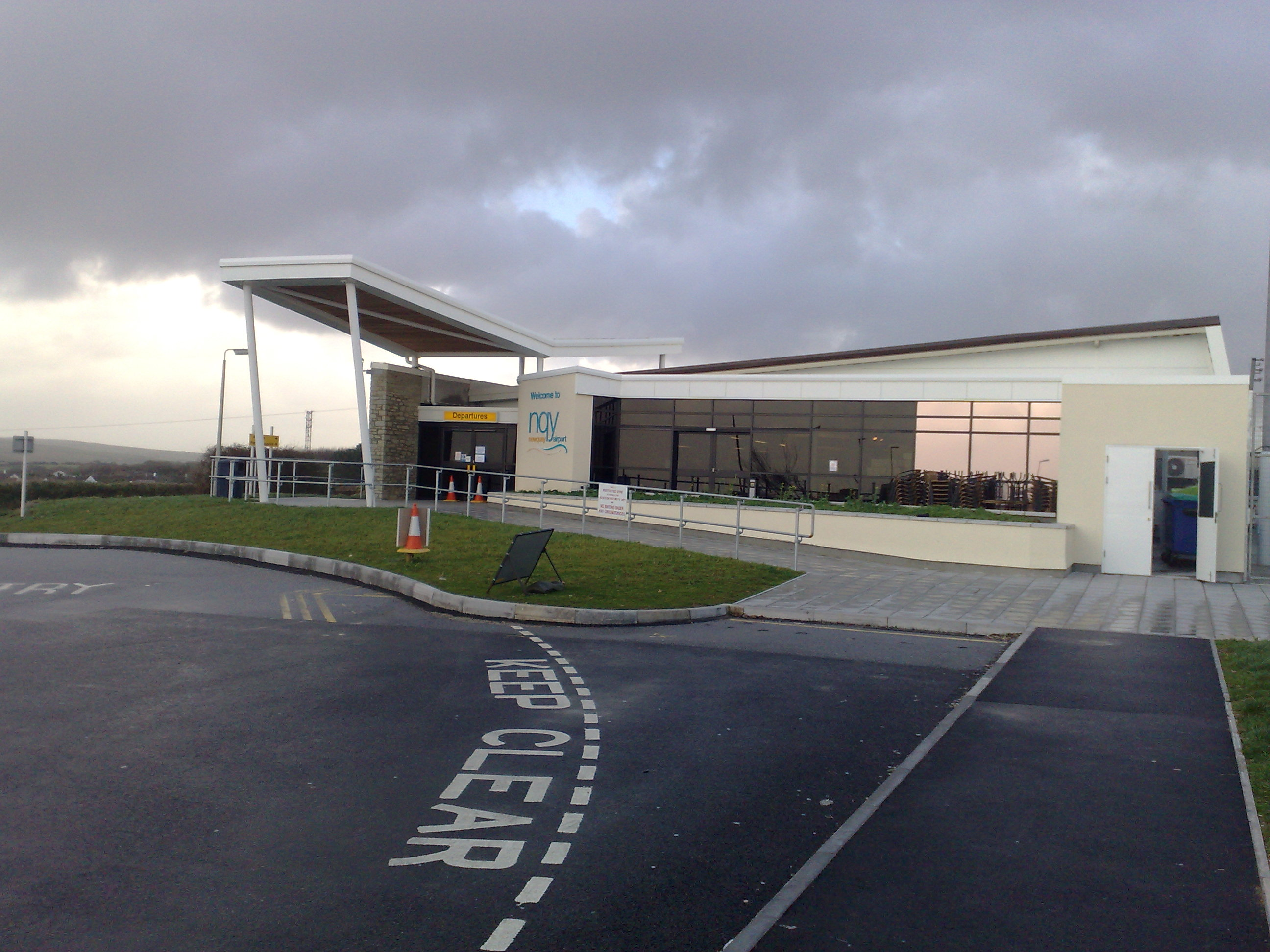
Newquay Airport

Newquay Airport provides links to many other parts of the United Kingdom. It is an HM Customs port because it also handles increasing numbers of foreign flights, both scheduled and chartered. Newquay is the principal airport for Cornwall, although there are several minor airfields elsewhere in the county.

Until 2008, Newquay Civil Airport (as it was formerly known) used the runway and other facilities of RAF St Mawgan, but in December 2008 the Ministry of Defence handed over most of the site to the recently formed Cornwall Airport Limited. The first stage of the conversion into a fully commercial airport was completed in 2011, although further substantial development is planned. The handover, which was due to take place at the end of 2008, was delayed for almost three weeks because of problems in obtaining the essential Civil Aviation Authority licence, which was withheld until further work had been carried out.

The name has changed several times since 2008, and the airport is now marketed as Cornwall Airport Newquay. However, the IATA code is still NQY.

Usage of the airport had been rising sharply until the COVID-19 pandemic in 2020–22. On summer Saturdays in 2018, there were almost 50 arrivals and departures, including flights to Germany and other continental countries.

Newquay Bus Station
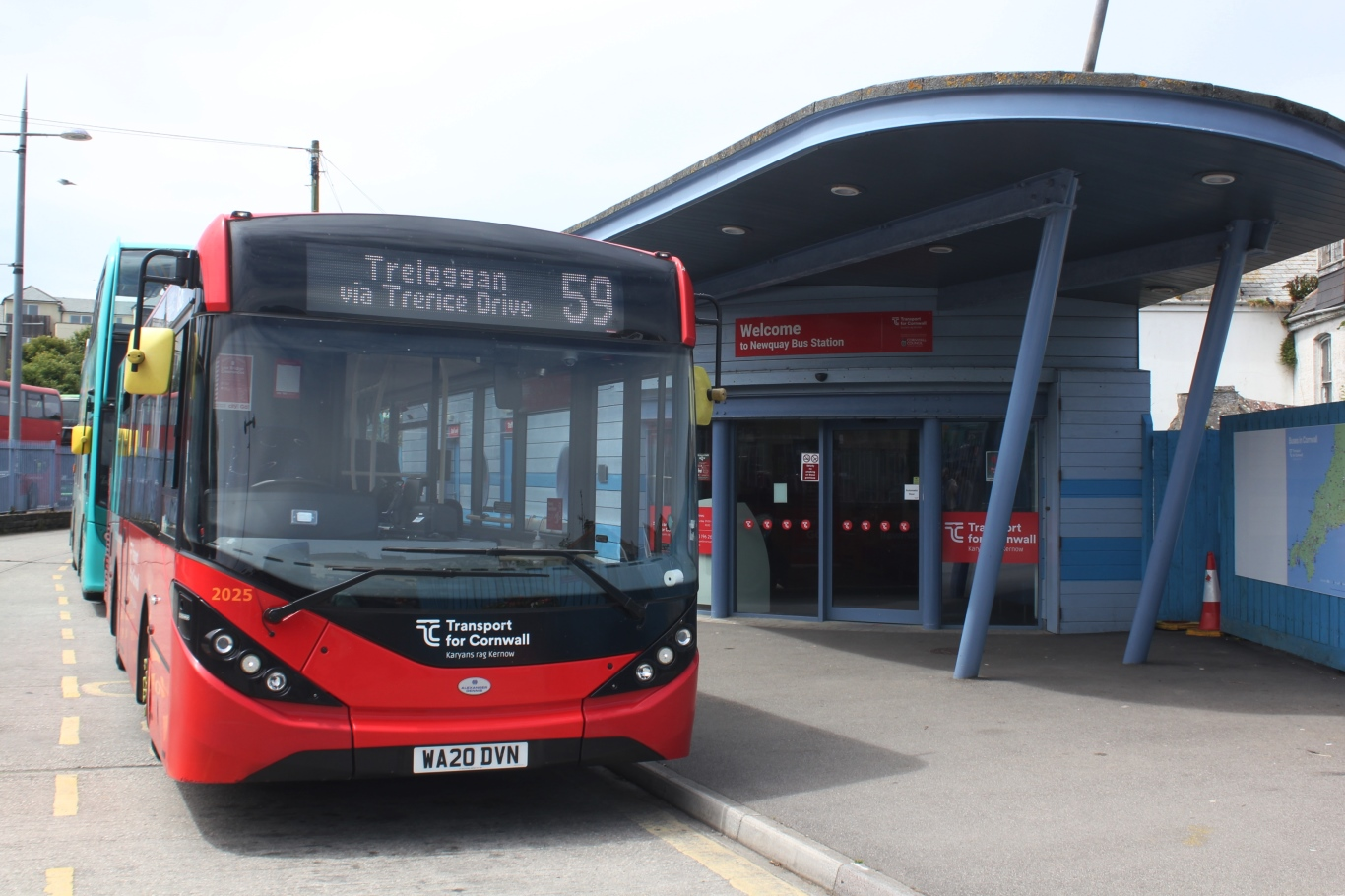
- Newquay Bus Station

General information
- Location: Manor Road, Newquay, Cornwall
- Owner: Transport for Cornwall
- Bus routes: 19
- Bus stands: 2
- Bus operators: Western Greyhound (1998 - 2015) Go Cornwall Bus (Since 2020) First South West (bus company) (1996 - 2026)

Other information
- Website: https://www.visitnewquay.org/visitor-information/newquay-bus-station-p1539193
Location

=== Bus ===
The bus station is in Manor Road, which runs parallel to the shopping area in Bank Street. A scheme to upgrade and improve the bus station with the additions of a new enclosed waiting area and accessible toilet began in February 2018 and was completed in July. Further changes occurred in April and May 2020, because Cornwall Council had awarded an eight-year contract to run subsidised services in the county to Go Cornwall, which also operates as Plymouth CityBus and is owned by the Go-Ahead Group.

There are regular bus services from Newquay to many parts of Cornwall, including the neighbouring urban centres of St Austell and Truro as well as Padstow, Perranporth, Redruth, St Columb Major and Wadebridge. In addition, there are several local services, including an hourly night bus service on Saturday nights/Sunday mornings to St Columb Major and Fraddon during the peak summer months. Buses are operated by FirstGroup and Go Cornwall Bus while the town is also served by National Express.

Go Cornwall operates frequent services in the high summer to and from a park and ride site by the A392, opposite Hendra Holiday Park.

In November 2025, First Group had announced that they would cease their Bus services in Cornwall on 14 February 2026, due to ongoing financial challenges.

== Education ==
Newquay has one higher education campus, Newquay University Centre, which is a member of the Combined Universities in Cornwall Partnership. It offers foundation degree courses in Zoological Conservation, Marine Aquaculture, Animal Science and Wildlife Education and Media. Appropriately, the campus is close to Newquay Zoo in the Trenance Valley. There are also two secondary schools: Newquay Tretherras is a state-funded academy with specialist Technology College status, and Treviglas Academy is a specialist Business and Enterprise College.

A new centre of higher education for Newquay had been planned alongside the Airport and Spaceport (see Transport) in 2020, to be known as the International Aviation Academy and attached to RAF St Mawgan. It was hoped to cater for students who wish to gain air- or space-related qualifications. The project was delayed by the COVID-19 pandemic and no further announcements have been made.

== Religious sites ==
=== Non-conformist ===
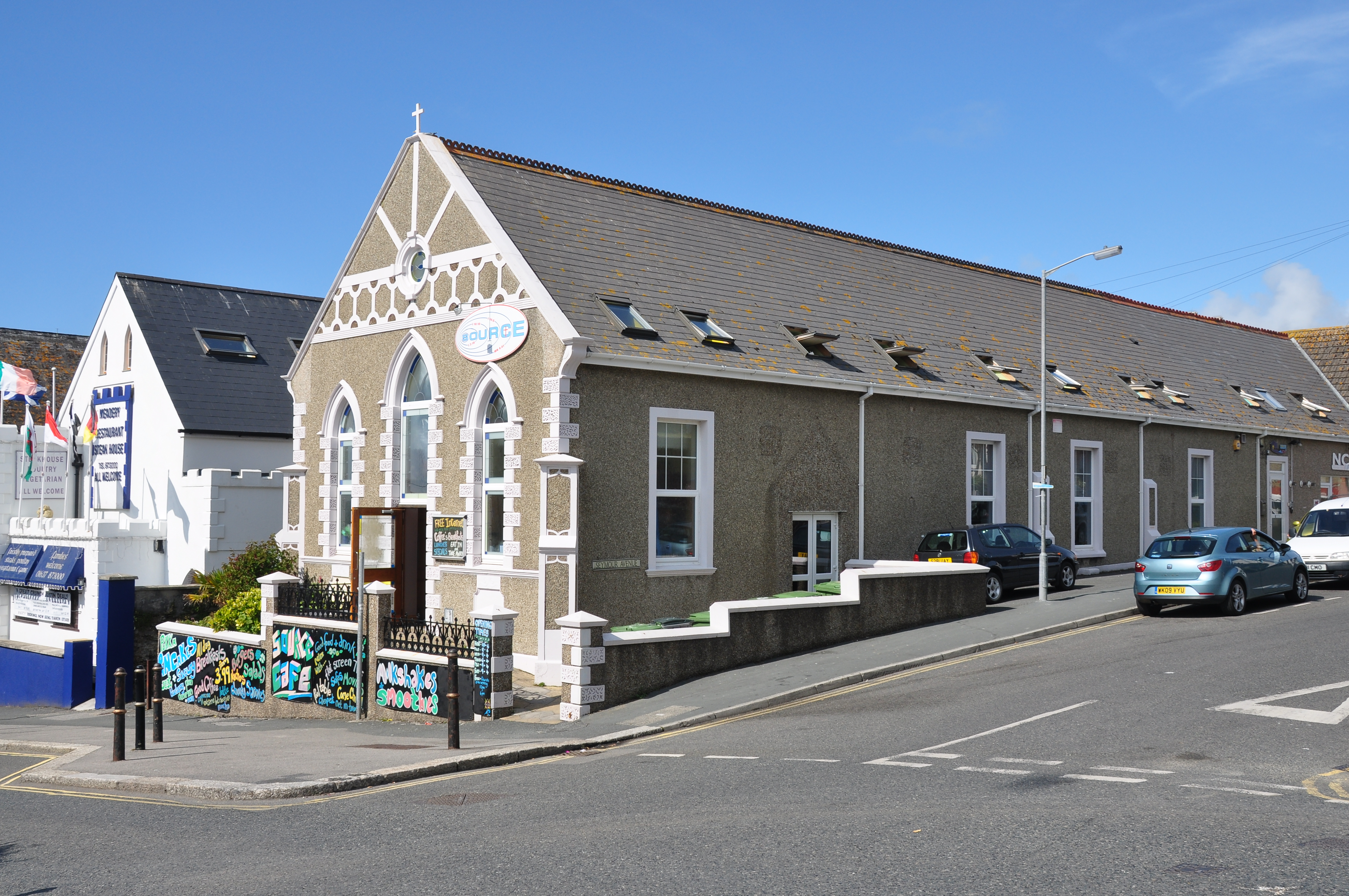
Chapel in Newquay

The first Methodist preaching at Newquay was recorded by Richard Treffry in 1802, an innkeeper, Carter, being the host. In 1810, preacher William O'Bryan came to Newquay and formed the nucleus of the first Methodist society. The society, later known as the Bible Christians or 'Bryanites', built a chapel in 1851. In 1907, following the amalgamation of the Methodist New Connexion, Bible Christians, and United Methodist Free Churches into the United Methodist Church, the chapel was renamed the Sydney Road United Methodist Church.The Methodist Union of 1932 further unified various Methodist denominations, and the chapel became known as the Sydney Road Methodist Chapel. It continued to serve the local congregation until its closure around 1977. Subsequently, the building was demolished, and the site was redeveloped for housing and a car park.

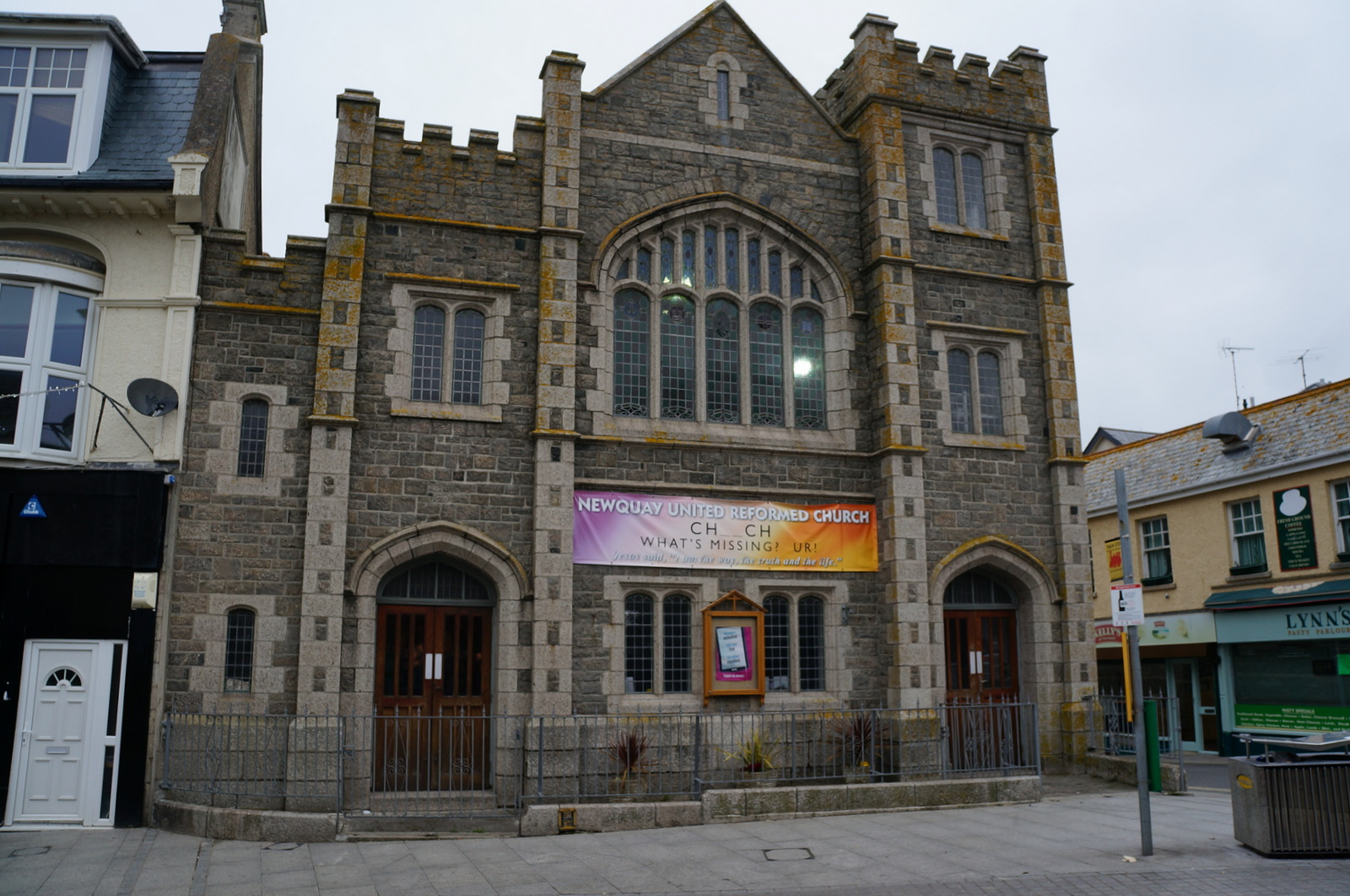
United Reformed Church, Bank Street

The Baptists were the first to have a building. The Newquay Baptist Church, formerly the Ebenezer Baptist Chapel founded in 1822, is one of the oldest religious buildings in Newquay. The worshippers at Ebenezer were Strict and Particular, or Calvinistic Baptists. Before the Baptist chapel was built the Strict Baptists formed themselves into a community and met for worship in the old malthouse opposite Primrose cottage on Beach Road. They had a regular Sunday supply of preachers from Plymouth, Torquay, and Truro.

The first Methodist chapel was built in 1833, at a cost of £170. In 1849, following a division within the Methodist movement, a significant portion of the congregation left to establish the Wesley Hill Chapel in 1852. The remaining members continued at Crantock Street until 1865, when they moved to the United Methodist Chapel on Marcus Hill, known as Steps Chapel. Following a visit by General Bramwell Booth in 1924, the building was taken over by the Salvation Army in 1926.

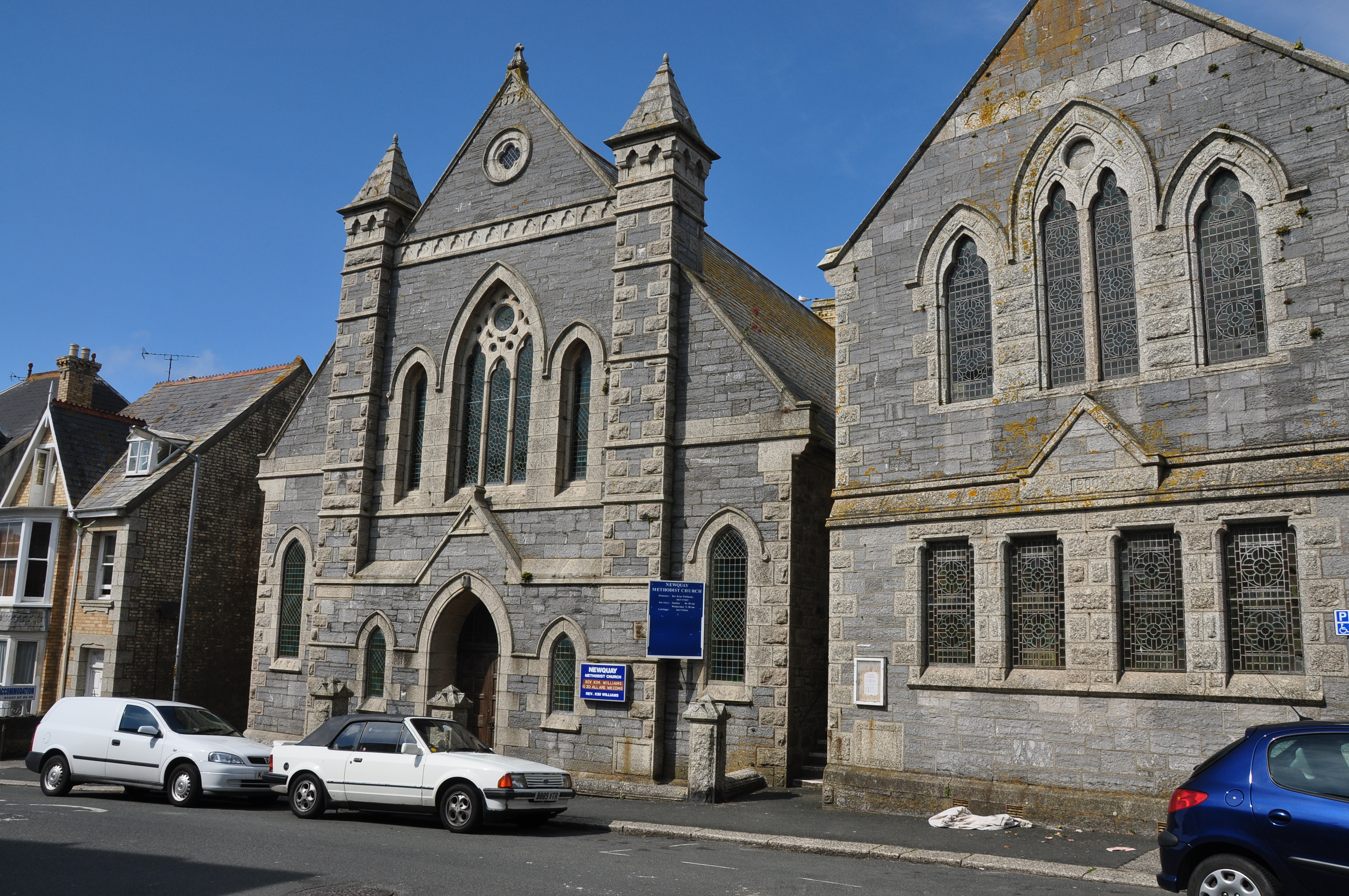
Newquay Methodist Church, Beachfield Avenue (Former)

The Wesleyan Methodist Church in Newquay, built in 1904, was designed in Gothic style by the architectural firm Bell, Withers, and Meredith. It served the growing Methodist community. Renamed the Newquay Wesleyan Methodist Chapel after the Methodist Church unification in 1932, it closed in 2009 due to declining congregations and was sold to the Elim Pentecostal Church. The Grade II listed building remains a key historical landmark.

==== Roman Catholic ====
The Roman Catholic Church of the Holy Trinity is earlier, having been built in 1903. Until 1985, it was dependent on monks from Bodmin but then became part of the Diocese of Plymouth.

=== Parish Church ===
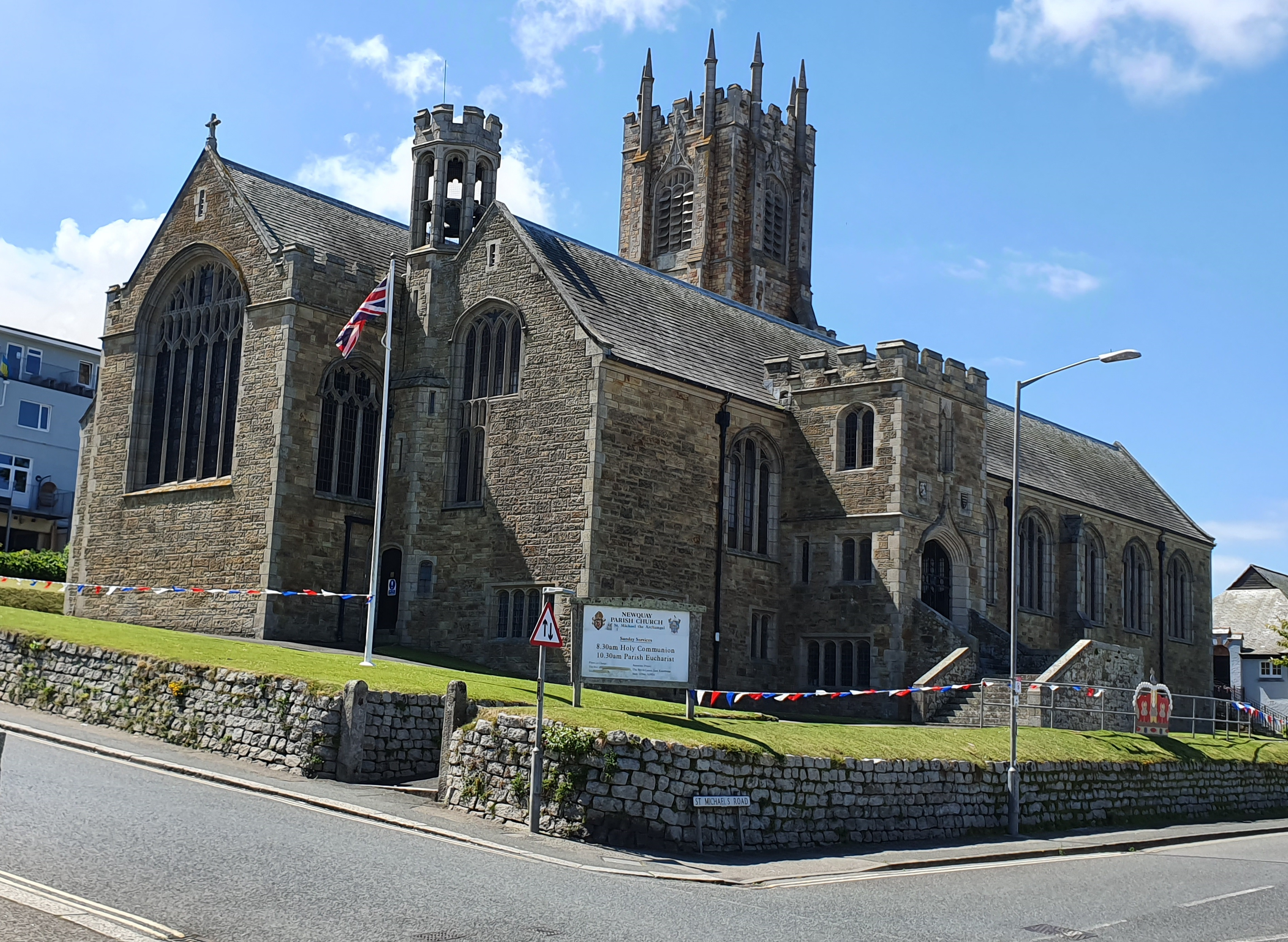
Church of St Michael the Archangel, Newquay

The first Anglican chapel was built in Newquay in 1858, as a chapel of ease, in a fine Cornish Perpendicular style; it was known as St Michael's due to the dedication of a side chapel. The parish itself was created in 1882 from part of St Columb Minor parish. By 1896, St Michael's Church had been twice enlarged, a north and a south aisle being added, and its capacity increased to 500. By the turn of the 19th century, however, it was quite inadequate to hold the summer congregation. The cramped and inconvenient site meant that no further enlargement of the chapel was possible, and it seemed inevitable that a new church would have to be built on a different site. The present church, the Newquay Parish Church of St Michael the Archangel is dedicated to St. Michael the Archangel, was originally designed by Ninian Comper and built in 1910–1911, but the tower not completed until the 1960s. Arthur Mee, in his Cornwall volume of the King's England series, describes the perpetual light maintained in the church as a memorial to the men of Newquay who died in the First World War. The stained glass windows and rood screen are also described: the main themes are St Michael, the three other archangels, and Jesus Christ and Mary the Blessed Virgin. The St Michael, chapel-of-ease continued to serve the people of Newquay until 1911 when the chapel was sold to the Women's Institute which owned it for a number of years until it was sold again to FW Woolworth for a new store. The chapel was demolished in 1937.

== Public Services ==
=== Emergency services ===
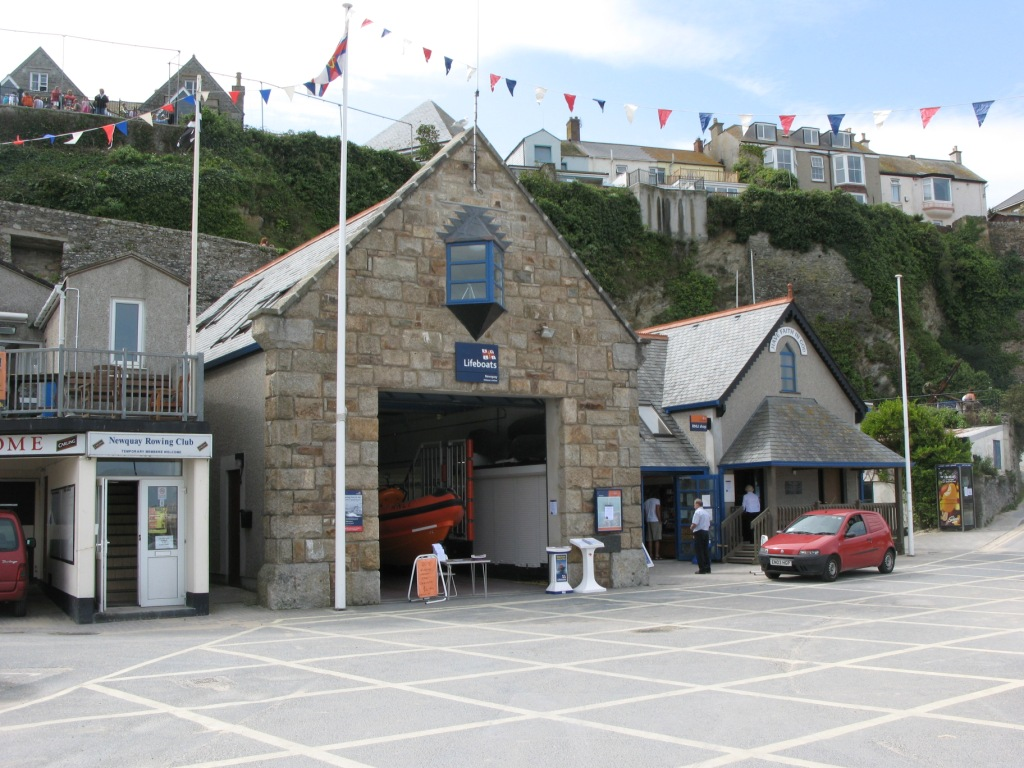
Newquay Lifeboat Station

Devon and Cornwall Constabulary maintains a substantial police station in Tolcarne Road. The modern fire station in Tregunnel Hill is run by Cornwall Fire and Rescue Service, and is the home of one of the two aerial ladder platforms based in Cornwall. The fire station has 24-hour cover during the summer and is day-staffed in the winter. A separate specialist fire service is maintained at Newquay Airport.

Ambulance cover is provided by the South Western Ambulance Service NHS Trust from an Ambulance Station in St Thomas Road. Cornwall Air Ambulance is also based just outside the town, alongside the airport. In addition, the airport at Newquay is one of ten UK bases for the Search and Rescue service, which is run by Bristow Helicopters on behalf of HM Coastguard.

The Royal National Lifeboat Institution's Newquay Lifeboat Station is at the harbour. There is also a coastguard rescue team based at Treloggan Industrial Park.

=== Newquay C0ommunity Hospital ===
Newquay Hospital was opened in 1931 at the end of St Thomas Road. It is a community hospital catering for both in- and outpatients, with a number of clinics and a minor injuries unit. Cornwall's only general hospital and full accident and emergency department is in Truro.

Proposals in recent years for the Newquay Growth Area, east of the present town, have included a new and larger hospital.

== Sport and leisure ==
Newquay has one non-league association football club - Newquay A.F.C. play at the Mount Wise Stadium. Godolphin Atlantic F.C. used to play on Godolphin Way until the club was dissolved in January 2023.

Newquay Hornets rugby football club play at Newquay Sports Centre.

Newquay has a four-team cricket club, also based at the sports centre. Their 1st XI compete in Cornwall's County One, winning the ECB Cornwall Premier League in 2003. Newquay's academy has produced four full-Cornwall players — Rob Harrison, Neil Ivamy, Joe Crane and Adam Cocking, in addition to numerous County youth representatives. There are several youth teams, ranging from Under 9 to Under 19.

Newquay plays host to the Newquay Road Runners, who are again based at the sports centre.

Newquay has been a centre for Cornish wrestling in the past. Venues for tournaments have included the New Hotel Meadow, Mount Wise recreation ground, the Red Lion Field and the Tower Meadow on Tower Road. The Interceltic games were hosted by Newquay in 1936, 1948, 1951, 1965 and 1975.

=== Surfing ===
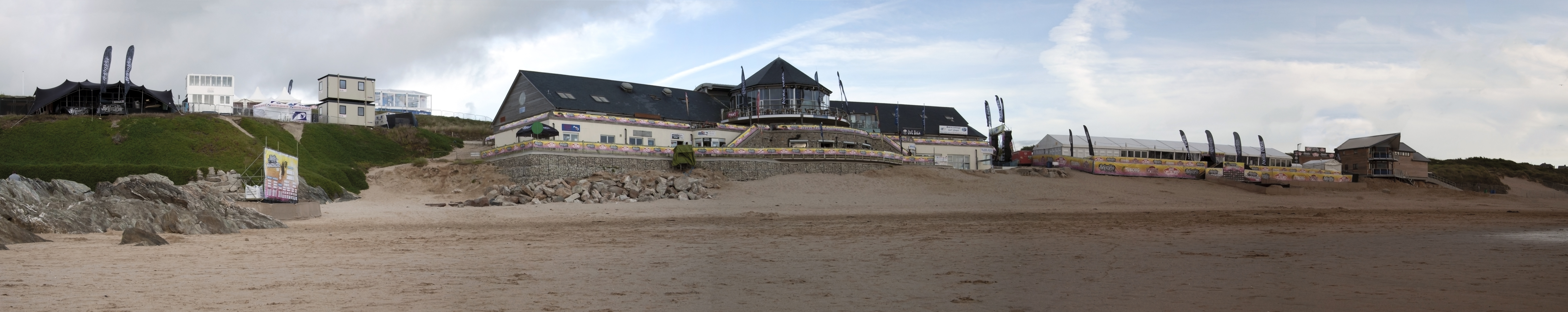
Fistral Beach showing the beach bar setup ready for the 2010 Boardmasters Festival

Newquay is widely regarded as the surf capital of the UK, and is therefore also a centre for the surf industry in Britain. There are many surf stores, board manufacturers and hire shops in the town.

At the centre of Newquay's surfing status is Fistral Beach.

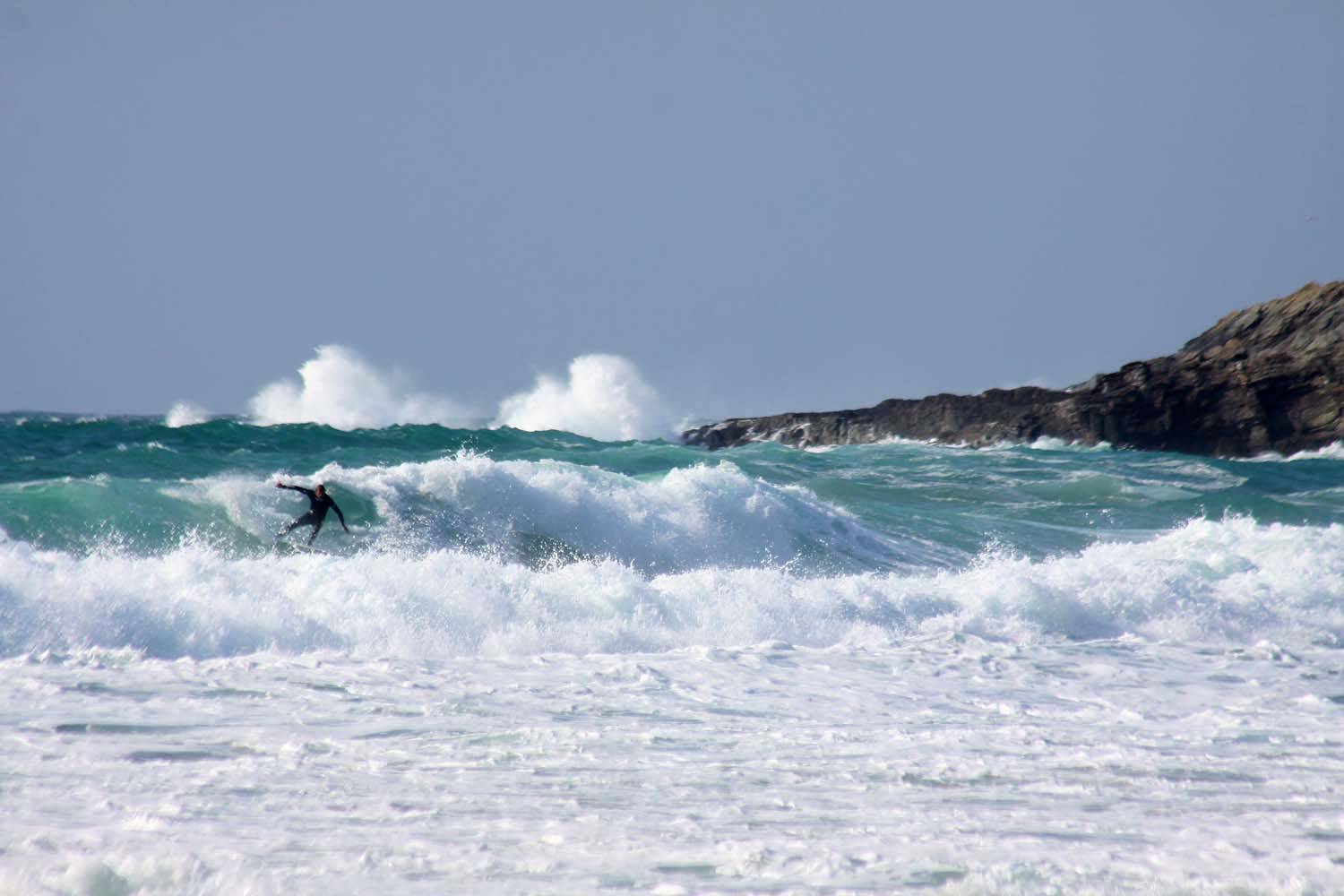
Surfing in Fistral Bay

Fistral Beach has been host to international surfing competitions for around 20 years now. The annual Boardmasters Festival takes place at Fistral beach, with a music festival taking place at Watergate Bay.

Newquay is also home to the reef known as the Cribbar. With waves breaking at up to 20 feet (6 m), the Cribbar was until recently rarely surfed as it requires no wind and huge swell to break. It was first surfed in September 1965 by Rodney Sumpter, Bob Head and Jack Lydgate and again in 1966, by Pete Russell, Ric Friar and Johnny McElroy and American Jack Lydgate. The recent explosion in interest in surfing large waves has seen it surfed more frequently by South African born Chris Bertish, who during a succession of huge clean swells in 2004, surfed the biggest wave ever seen there.

Towan, Great Western and Tolcarne beaches nearer the town and nearby Crantock and Watergate Bay also provide high quality breaks.

In 2011, an artificial reef was proposed in Newquay to increase the swell and frequency of waves for surfers. However, it lost council support after local rowing clubs and fishermen protested against it.

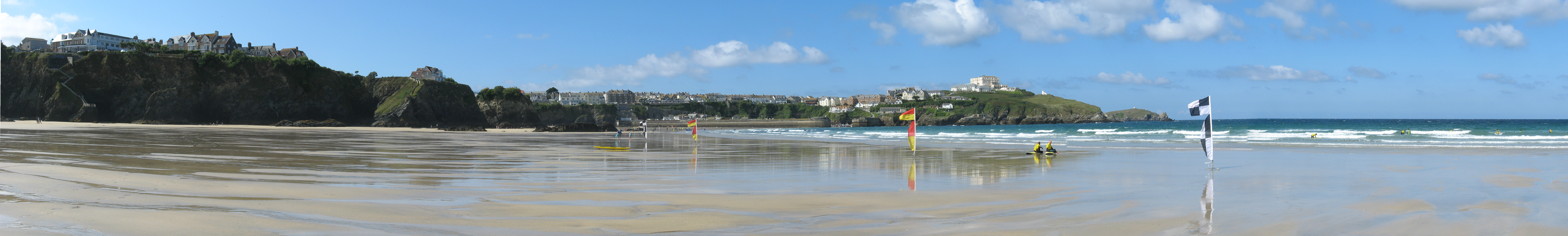
Newquay, harbour, Atlantic Hotel and headland from Tolcarne Beach

== Notable people ==
See Category:People from Newquay

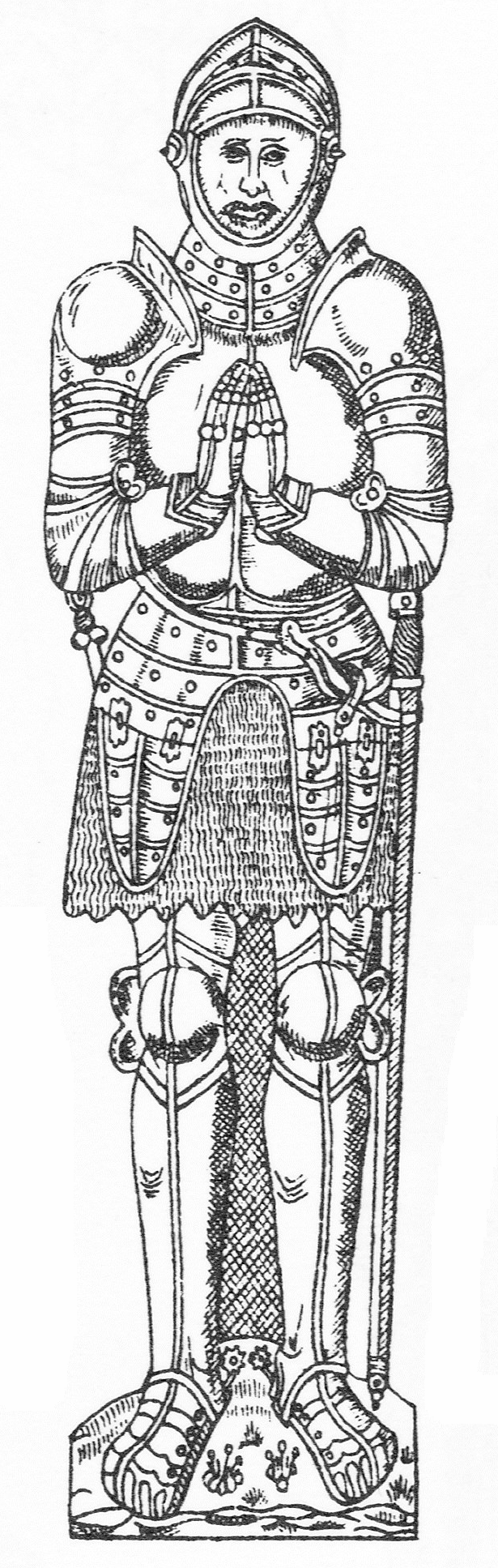
Sir John Arundell

- Sir John Arundell (1495–1561), of Trerice, a commander of the Royal Navy during the reigns of Kings Henry VIII and Edward VI
- John Coulson Tregarthen (1854–1933), naturalist and novelist, lived in Newquay.
- Sir George Cockerill, (1867–1957), Army officer, politician and MP from 1918 to 1931.
- Alexander Lodge (1881–1938) was an English inventor who did early work and held some patents on the spark plug
- Charlotte Mary Matheson (1888-1937), novelist, lived at Porth Veor
- Sir Melford Stevenson (1902–1987), barrister and later, a High Court judge, his judicial career was marked by controversial conduct and outspoken views.
- William Golding (1911–1993), novelist, author of Lord of the Flies, winner of 1983 Nobel Prize in Literature, was born in Newquay
- Sir David Willcocks (1919–2015), choral conductor, organist and composer.
- Richard Long, 4th Viscount Long (1929–2017), lived at The Island, a house on a rock linked to the mainland by a private suspension bridge.
- Phillip Schofield (born 1962), TV presenter, attended Newquay Tretherras School
- Steve Double (born 1966), politician, MP for St Austell and Newquay from 2015 to 2024
- Ruarri Joseph (born 1982), singer-songwriter, lives in the Newquay area
- James Morrison (born 1984), singer-songwriter, grew up at Porth, he attended Treviglas College

=== Sport ===
- Chris Morris (born 1963), footballer, played 314 games including 158 for Celtic and 35 for Ireland
- Scot Bennett (born 1990), footballer, played over 460 games including 288 for Newport County
- Brad Pauls (born 1993), English professional boxer, and former British middleweight champion
- Tommy Foster (born 2002), racing driver, competes for RJN Motorsport, has competed for Le Mans Cup
- Katie Robinson (born 2002), footballer for England women

== Twinning ==
Newquay is twinned with Dinard in Brittany, France.

== Filmography ==
- The Headland Hotel, next to Fistral Beach, has been used in several films, including Wild Things (1988) and The Witches (1990).
- The Beatles filmed part of the Magical Mystery Tour film in Newquay. Scenes were filmed at the Atlantic Hotel and Towan Beach.
- Some of the scenes in Blue Juice (1995) were filmed in Newquay.

== See also ==
- List of topics related to Cornwall
