= Wave House Church =

Coordinates: 50.4137°N 5.0806°W

- Wave House
- Wesleyan Methodist Church (Formerly)
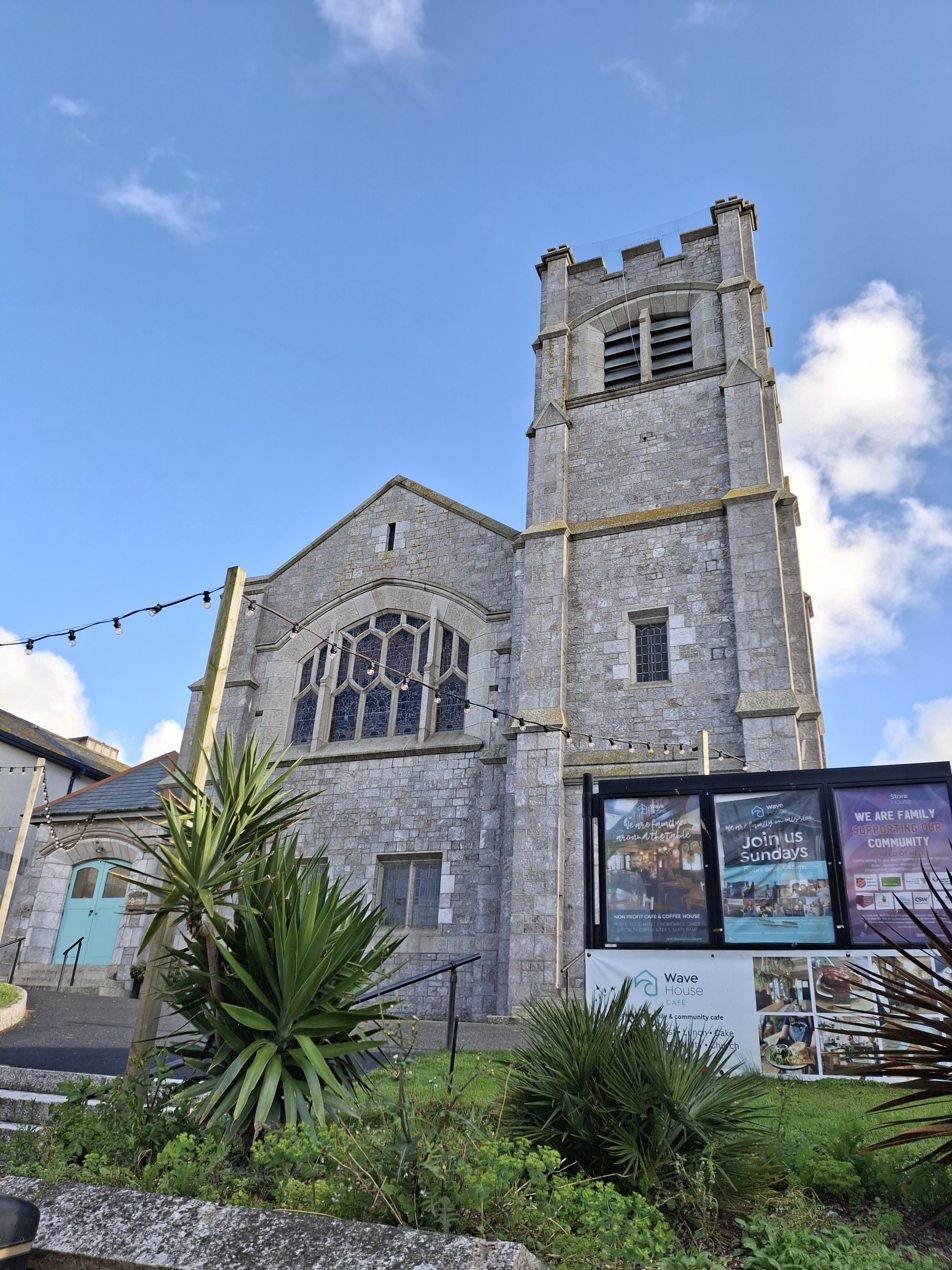
- Wave House Church
- Location: Newquay
- Country: UK
- Denomination: Pentecostal
- Previous denomination: Wesleyan Methodist
- Website: Wave House Church

Listed Building – Grade II
- Official name: Wesleyan Methodist Church and attached Church Hall
- Designated: 12 May 1988
- Reference no.: 1327389

History
- Former name(s): Newquay Wesleyan Methodist Chapel Newquay Methodist Church Newquay Christian Centre

Architecture
- Architect(s): Bell, Withers and Meredith
- Style: Late Gothic style
- Groundbreaking: July 1903
- Completed: 1904

Specifications
- Capacity: 700 people

Wave House Church is an evangelical Christian church in Newquay, Cornwall, UK. It forms part of the Elim Foursquare Gospel Alliance. The building was formerly the Wesleyan Methodist Church, a historic building in the town centre.

The Church was designated as a Grade II listed building in 1988.

== History ==
Methodist preaching in Newquay began in 1802, forming part of the early spread of Methodism across Cornwall. The town’s first purpose-built chapel was opened in 1833 on Crantock Street, serving a steadily growing Methodist community.

In 1852, a national rift within Methodism, commonly known as the Wesleyan Reform movement had a significant impact locally. A section of Newquay’s Methodist congregation separated from the original society and established a new place of worship at Wesley Hill, creating two Methodist communities within the town. Throughout the latter half of the nineteenth century, both congregations expanded, reflecting Newquay’s population growth and its development as a seaside resort.

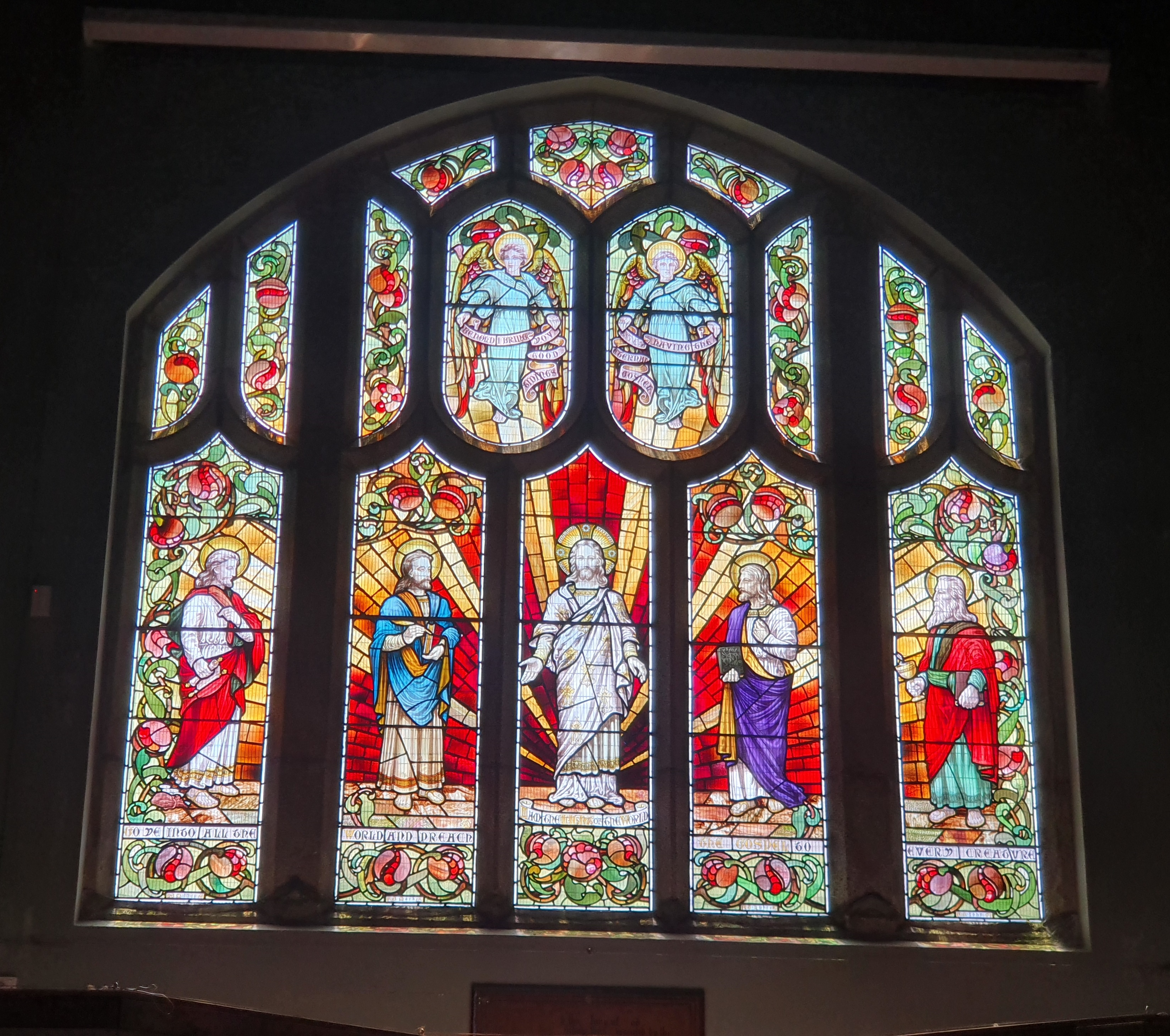
Stained-glass window, Wave House Church, East Street

By the closing years of the nineteenth century, the Wesley Hill chapel had become too small for the expanding Wesleyan congregation. As a result, plans were made for a larger and more architecturally prominent church. A central site on East Street was selected, and the new East Street Wesleyan Methodist Church was completed in 1904, designed by the architectural firm Bell, Withers and Meredith, The façades are finished in limestone from Plymouth, with stone from St.Columb cladded the back and sides, and every dressing crafted from granite from Penryn. An attached hall was also built, intended for a Sunday school.

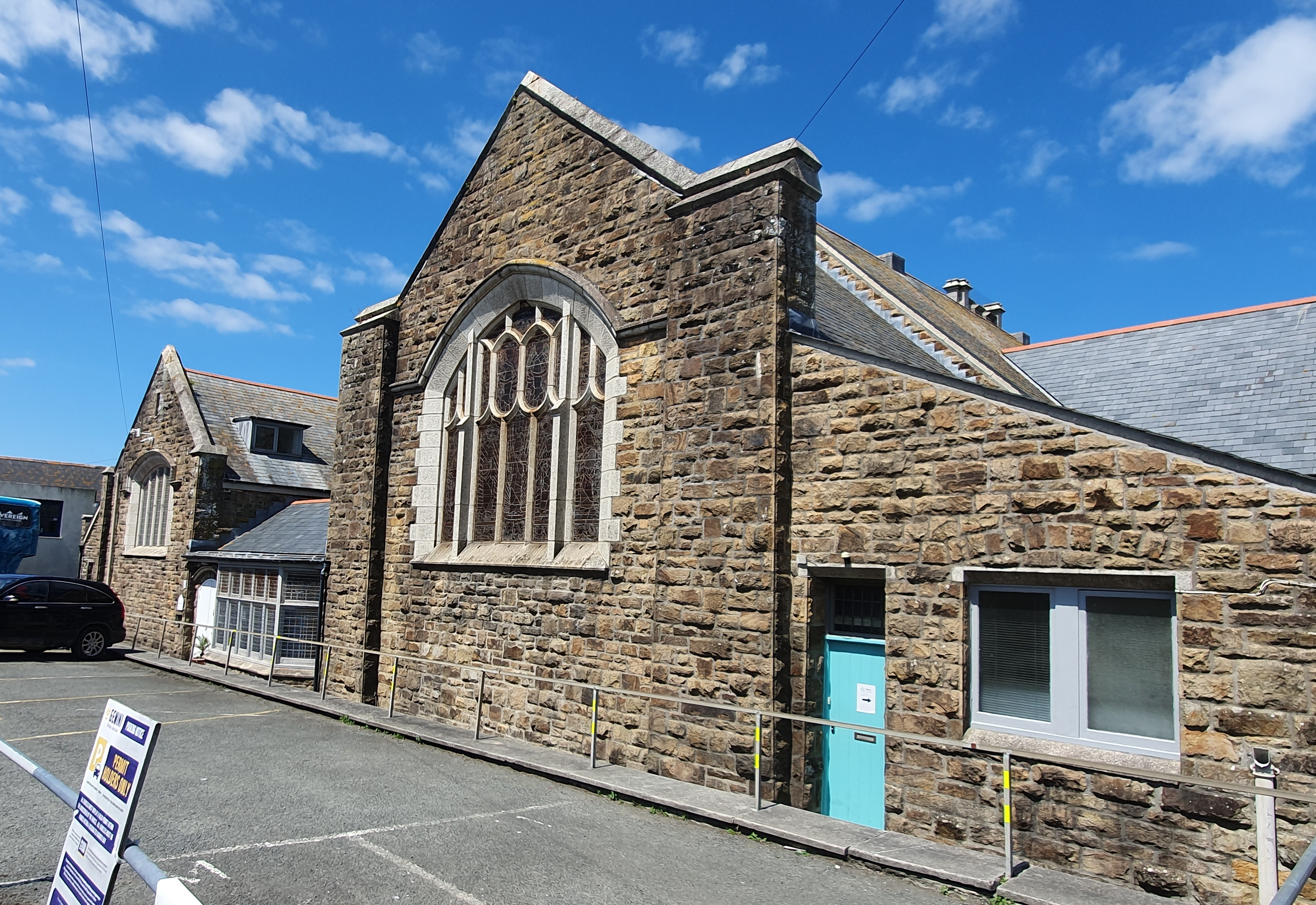
Wave House Church rear of building

For much of the twentieth century, the East Street chapel served as one of Newquay’s principal Methodist churches, hosting worship services, children’s programmes, and a variety of midweek meetings. Following the 1932 Methodist Union, which brought together several Methodist branches nationally, many of Newquay’s separate chapels were gradually consolidated. As attendance patterns changed in the late twentieth century, several Methodist sites in the town were closed or merged.

Newquay Wesleyan Methodist Church eventually ceased to function as an active Methodist place of worship. The building was later acquired by the Elim Pentecostal Church in 2009.

The new congregation refurbished the interior to create contemporary worship and community spaces while retaining the architectural character of the historic building

In September 2025, Queen Camilla visited the Church as part of her duties as Patron of the Cornwall Community Foundation, meeting volunteers and beneficiaries of the church’s community projects.
