= Cribbar =

The Cribbar
- Reef
- Location in Cornwall
- Coordinates: 50.425°N 5.099°W
- Grid position: SW799629
- Location: Cornwall, England, UK

The Cribbar (Cornish: Kribow, meaning reefs), also known as the Widow Maker, is a reef off the Towan Headland in Newquay, Cornwall, United Kingdom.

The Cribbar is best known for creating annual big waves, popular with experienced big-wave surfers from across the world. Wave faces can be in excess of 30 ft (9.1 m). The Zorba is a reef 2 miles (3.2 km) further off the coast and can create even higher waves.

== Surfing ==
The Cribbar was first surfed in 1966 by Ric Friar, Australians Pete Russell and Johnny McElroy, and American Jack Lydgate. In January 2016, 15-year-old Kamron Matthews became the youngest person known to have surfed Cribbar.
