= Central Inn, Newquay =

Central Inn
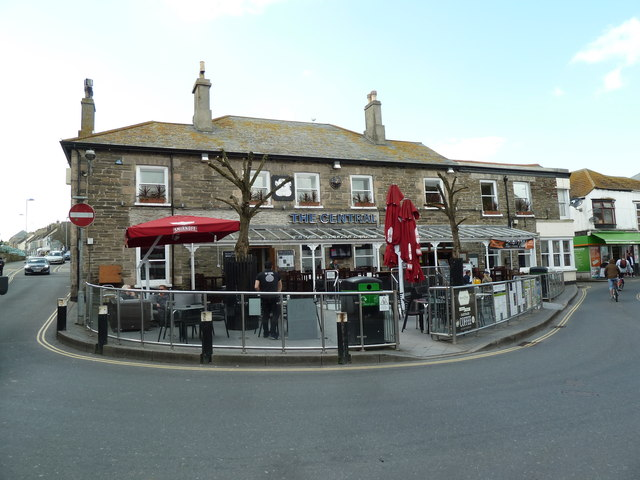
- Former names: Central Hotel; Commercial Hotel
- Alternative names: The Central

General information
- Location: Newquay, Cornwall
- Country: United Kingdom
- Year(s) built: 18th century 1859 (rebuilt)
- Owner: St Austell Brewery

Design and construction
- Architect(s): John Ennor (1859)

Website
- https://thecentralnewquay.co.uk/

The Central Inn (commonly known as The Central) is a pub and restaurant located in Central Square, Newquay, Cornwall, United Kingdom. With origins dating back to the 18th century, it is one of the town’s most prominent and long-standing Inns The pub is owned and operated by St Austell Brewery.

== History ==
An inn has existed on the site since at least 1755. The original structure was a freestone building with a thatched roof, later replaced with slate. By the mid-19th century, the building had fallen into disrepair and was subsequently rebuilt in 1859. During this time, the inn was known as the Commercial Inn, a name reflecting its importance as a stop for merchants and travelers to the settlement.

In as early as 1802, travelling preachers of the Bible Christian movement of William O'Bryan were entertained at the Inn.

In the early 20th century, the establishment became known as the Central Hotel, before eventually adopting its current name, The Central Inn.
