= Fistral Bay Hotel =

Hotel in Newquay, Cornwall, United Kingdom

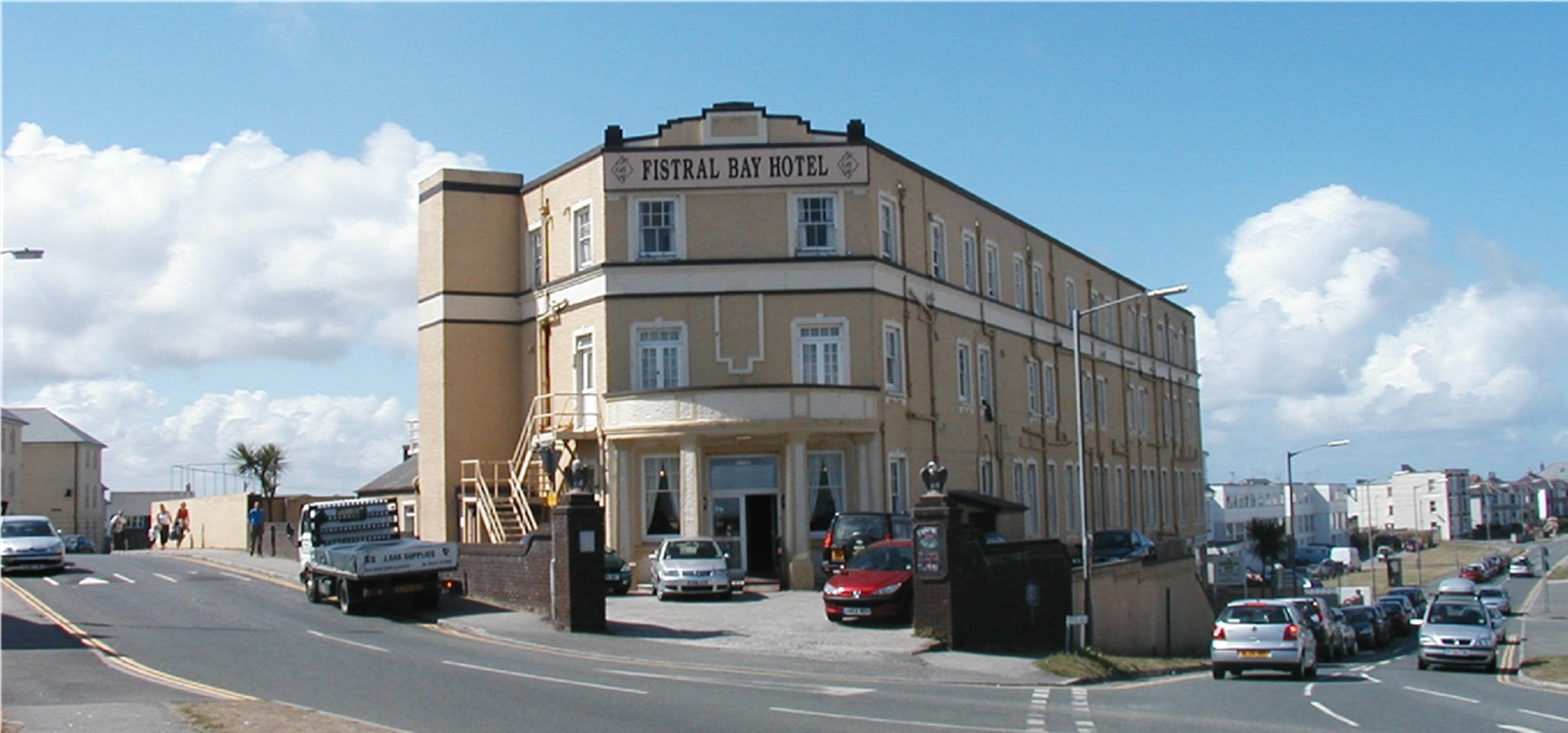
- Interactive map of the Fistral Bay Hotel area
- Former names: The Fistral Bay Hotel

General information
- Status: Demolished
- Architectural style: Art-Deco
- Location: Newquay, Cornwall, UK, 1 Pentire Ave, Newquay TR7 1NZ
- Coordinates: 50.4117°N 5.0999°W
- Opened: 1910
- Closed: 2006
- Demolished: 2021

Technical details
- Floor count: 4

Other information
- Number of rooms: 60

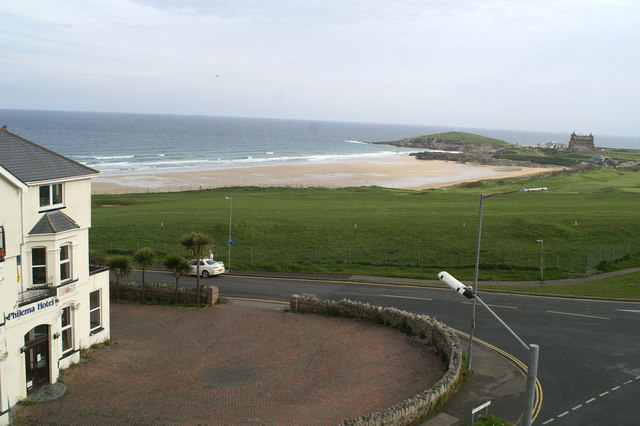
View from room 205

Fistral Bay Hotel was a hotel in Newquay, Cornwall, England. It overlooked Fistral Beach and a nearby golf course.

The Fistral Bay Hotel thrived during the 1950s and 1960s when Newquay benefited from increasing holiday travel to Cornwall and Devon. After 75 years of business, the hotel closed in 2006, and, after subsequently falling into disrepair, gained local notoriety as "the town’s biggest eyesore". The building was eventually demolished in 2021 and replaced with apartments.

== History ==
During the early 1930s, accommodation for visitors in Newquay increased as the town's popularity grew among tourists. Many existing hotels expanded during this time, such as the Great Western Hotel and the now-demolished St. Brannock's Hotel. However, the art-deco-themed Fistral Bay Hotel and The Pentire Hotel became the first purpose-built hotels in Pentire.

The hotel appears in computer dating pioneer Joan Ball's autobiography Just Me, where the author describes having stayed in Newquay for a short while during World War II. In the same war, the hotel was requisitioned by the military as a convalescent hospital.

=== Fire ===
On May 5, 1957, plans to open the hotel during the summer were delayed when a fire broke out. Someone from the neighbouring Philema Hotel reported flames coming from the foyer, followed by cracking windows and visible smoke plumes. The local fire department successfully extinguished the fire. Workmen were on site the next day to repair damage. In the same war, the hotel was requisitioned by the military as a convalescent hospital.
