= Richard Friar =

- Occupation: Artist / horticulturist
- Style: Semi-abstract; Abstract expressionism
- Partner: Wendy Harper
- Website: ricfriar.com

Richard "Ric" Friar is an English-Australian big wave surfer, artist, peace activist, film-maker and horticulturist. He is known as a pioneer of commercial cannabis (hemp) cultivation in Australia.

== Big wave surfing ==
Friar is considered a pioneer of 1960s big wave surfing. In 1966, he was among the first to surf the Cribbar off Towan Head in the United Kingdom, along with Peter Russell, John McIlroy and American Jack Lydgate, during that year's Great September Swell. In 2013, Friar contacted locals in Newquay with plans to reunite the group of 1966 Cribbar surfers for the 2016 unveiling of a monument and a "celebration of British surfing" event. He has also announced his and his partner, Wendy Harper's, plans to establish the "International Surfing Pilgrim's Trail" and a "global sustainability project" called 1GiantWave.

== Horticulture ==
In the early 1990s, Friar was humorously dubbed the "King of Poo" by the Sydney Morning Herald's quirky Column 8 for his disposal of manure for the Agricultural Society at the Sydney Royal Easter Show. He continued to pioneer the use of worms, mulch and manure in horticulture and established a business selling related products.

In 2009, Friar received permission from the New South Wales Department of Primary Industries for a pilot program to study the potential commercialisation of hemp. Friar cultivated 500 cannabis plants and suggested potential applications in the "textile and construction industries". The pilot would also allow consideration of applications including automotive fibreglass, paper and biofuel. Friar said Government fears about psychoactive cannabis had put a stop to what had once been among the world's largest crops.

== Film making and art ==
Having semi-retired, Friar and partner Wendy Harper have produced a number of short films about their commercial endeavours and general interests. In 2007, they produced an hour-long documentary about the anti-war movement in Australia and parallels between it and the Australian Aboriginal indigenous rights movement. Called Think About It!, the documentary starred indigenous actor David Gulpilil and included commentary from former Prime Minister, Malcolm Fraser, former Greens leader, Bob Brown, and Terry Hicks, father of Guantanamo Bay detainee David Hicks. In 2009, Friar produced a short film detailing the social aspects of railway history in Western New South Wales.

In 2011, Friar and Harper collaborated with two-time Wynne Prize winner Ian Bettinson to create a series of semi-abstract artworks and poetry. Over three weeks, the artists jointly created 30 works of art that were subsequently featured at the live exhibition version of Grand Designs Australia. The paintings were displayed with corresponding poetic works written by Harper.

Friar is known for using wood ash and other unusual artistic mediums as well as bark, leaves and grass in place of paint brushes. Also in 2011, Friar controversially used the ashes from his son's cremation to create a series of artworks as a tribute. He now produces similar artworks for others.

== See also ==
- Cannabis in Australia
