= Newquay Parish Church of St Michael the Archangel =

Church in Cornwall, England

Coordinates: 50.4127°N 5.0821°W

Newquay Parish Church
- Newquay Parish Church of St Michael the Archangel
- Church of St Michael; St Michael's Church
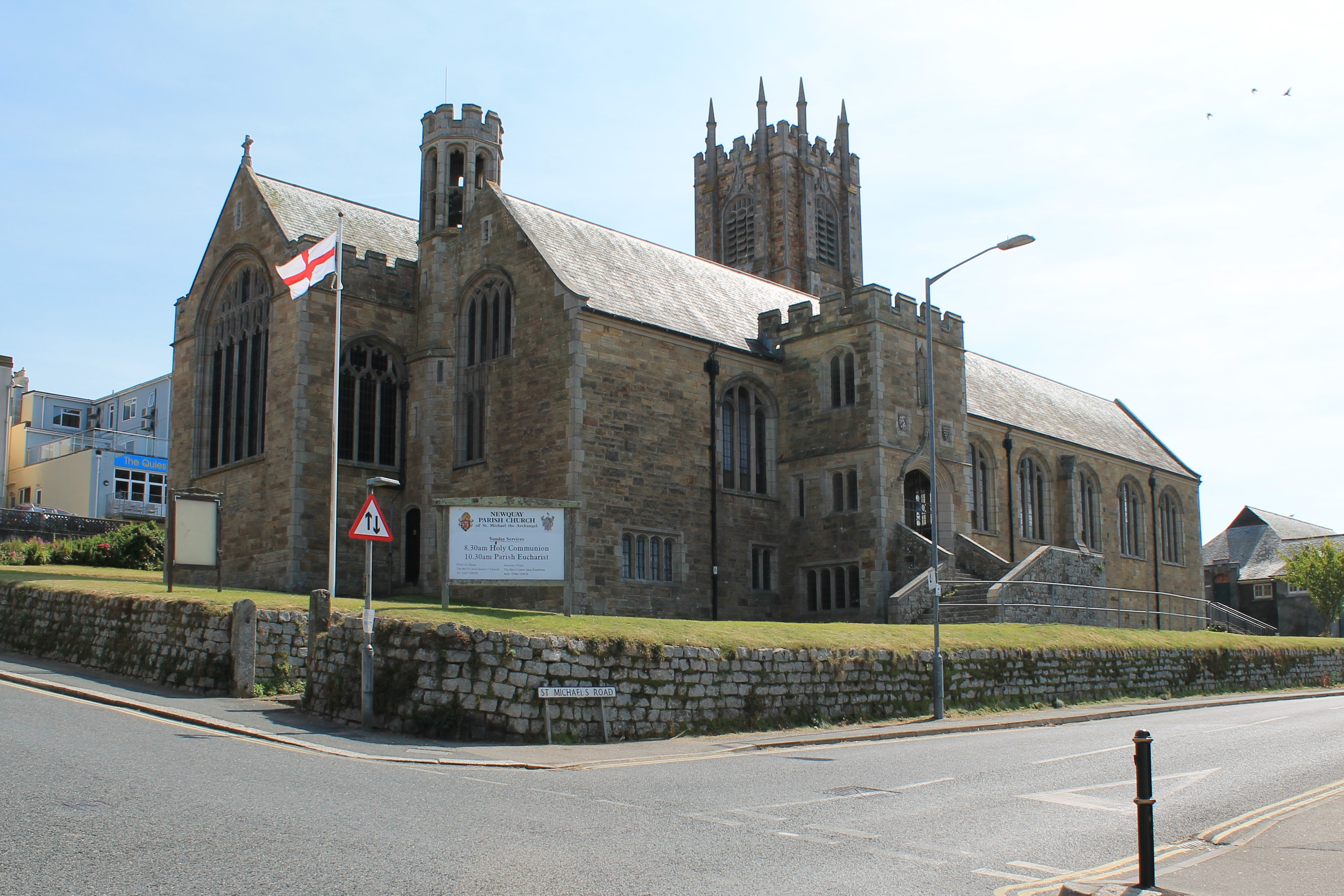
- Newquay Parish Church
- Location: Newquay, Cornwall
- Denomination: Church of England
- Churchmanship: Anglican
- Website: https://www.stmichaelsnewquay.org.uk/

History
- Status: Active
- Founded: 1858
- Dedication: St Michael the Archangel
- Consecrated: 12th July 1911

Architecture
- Functional status: Parish Church
- Architect(s): Sir Ninian Comper; Sebastian Comper
- Style: Perpendicular
- Years built: 1909-11 (Church) 1969 (Tower) 1995 (partiality rebuilt)
- Completed: 1911
- Construction cost: £11,000

Listed Building – Grade II*
- Official name: Church of St Michael
- Designated: 24 Oct 1951
- Reference no.: 1144109

Administration
- Diocese: Diocese of Truro
- Deanery: Pydar
- Benefice: The Benefice Of Towan Blystra
- Parish: St Columb Minor Parish pre 1896 Newquay Civil Parish formed in 1896 Ecclesiastical Parish formed in 1918

Clergy
- Rector: Canon Revd Jane Kneebone Paul Carter
- Vicar: Reverend Chris Harrigan

The Newquay Parish church of St Michael the Archangel, (also known as St Michael's Church) is located in Newquay, Cornwall, England, United Kingdom, and is dedicated to the St. Michael the Archangel. Since 1951 the church has been designated as a Grade II* listed building. It is an active Anglican parish church in the diocese of Truro, the archdeaconry of Cornwall and the deanery of Pydar.

The Benefice of Towan Blystra formed in 2022 which brings together the churches of St. Michael's Church, St Columb Minor & Colan, and St Newlyn East. As of October 2024, The Benefice has entered a period of transition as a new Oversight Minister is recruited.

== History ==
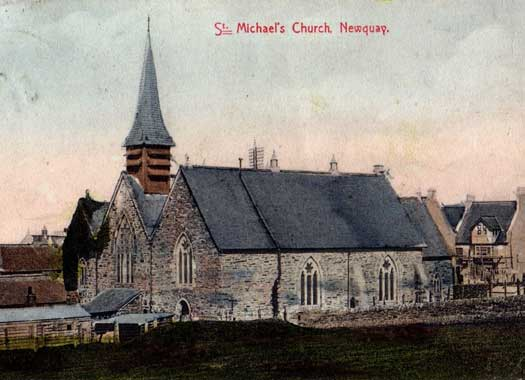
The Former - St Michael's Chapel of Ease, Newquay (c.1880)

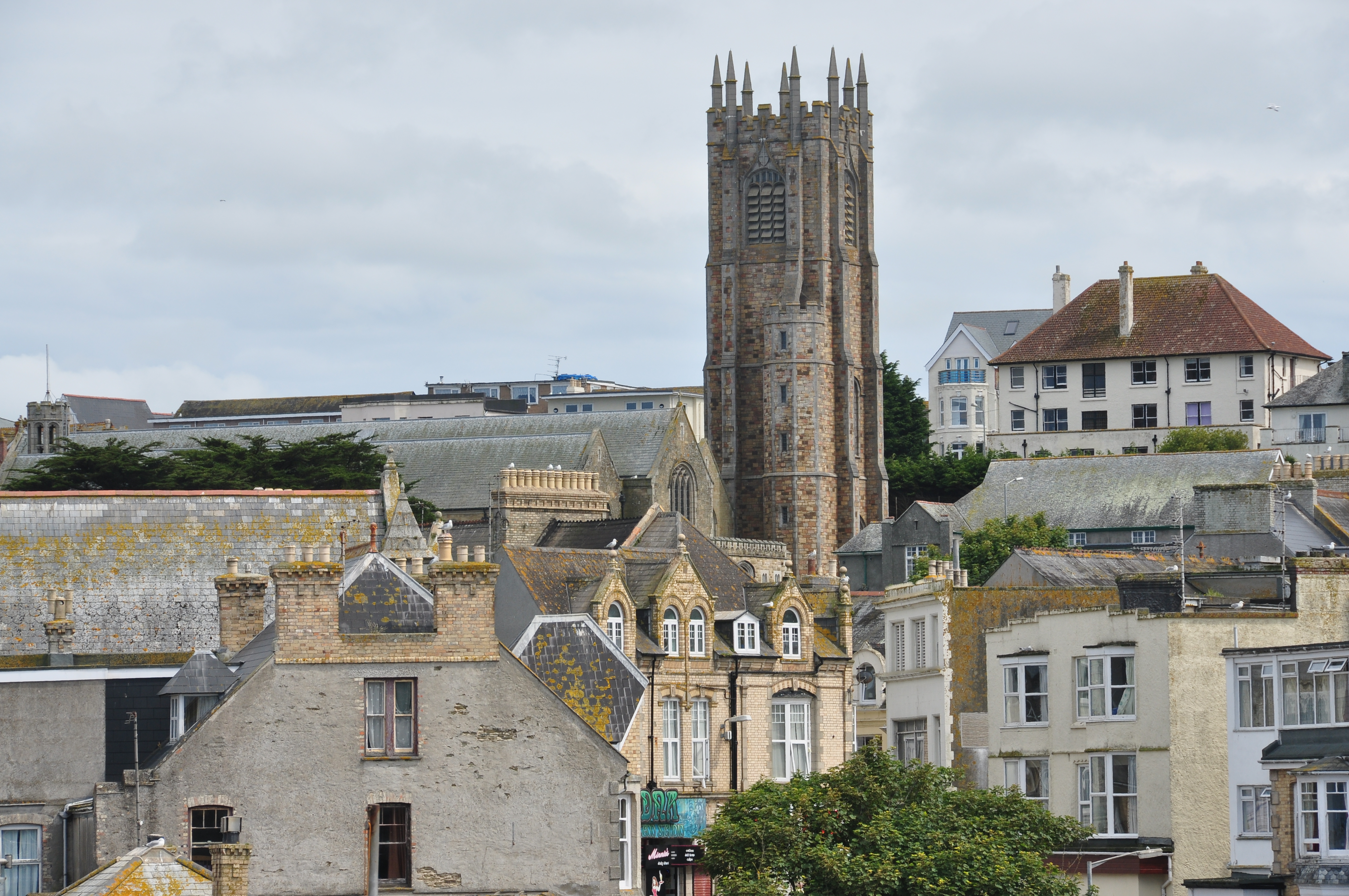
View of the church

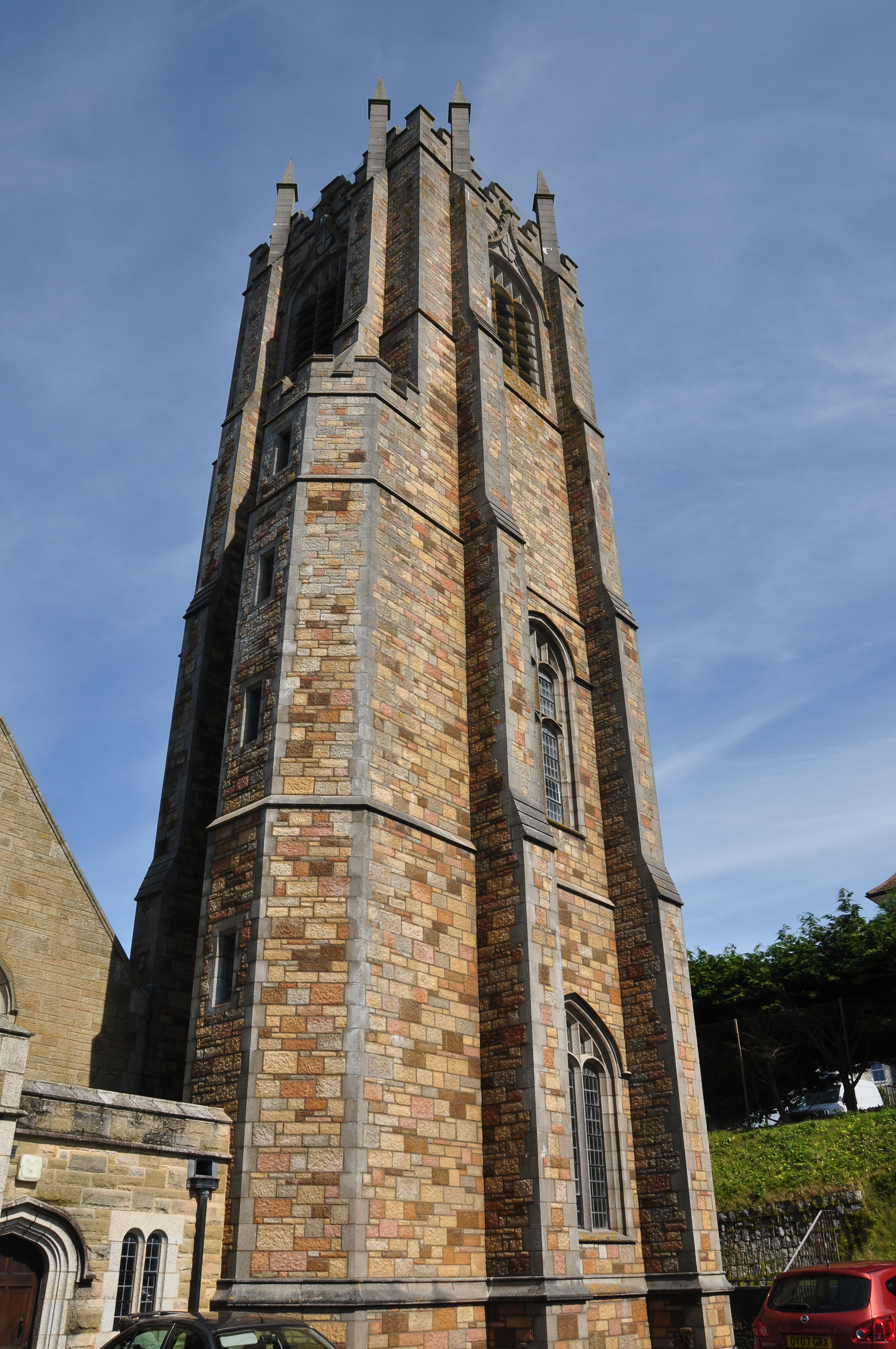
The Church Tower which is a Squared Elvan rubble with granite dressings.

=== St Michael's, chapel of ease (demolished) ===
In the early 19th century, when Newquay's pilchard fishery and boatbuilding industry were at their height, meetings for worship began to be held in town itself. The Baptists were the first to have a building here (in 1822) and the first Methodist chapel was built in about 1833 but those who needed to visit an Anglican Church (Church of England) had to travel to St Columb Minor Parish Church.

Dr Hutton and Revd Edward Bouverie Pusey, a leading figure in the Oxford Movement, Revd Chudleigh built a ‘Chapel of ease’ in the heart of Newquay. The first Anglican chapel was built in 1858 (by the Reverend Nicholas Chudleigh) as a chapel-of-ease, in a Cornish Perpendicular style; it was known as St Michaels due to the dedication of a side chapel. The Chapel held its first service on 9 September 1858. The Newquay parish itself was created 1896 from part of St Columb Minor parish. that same year the Chapel of Ease had been twice enlarged, a north and a south aisle being added, and its capacity increased to 500. By the turn of the 20th century, it became difficult to hold the summer congregation due to the number of people attending. The cramped and inconvenient site meant that no further enlargement of any kind was possible, and it seemed inevitable that a new large church would have to be built on a new site.

The St Michaels, Chapel of Ease continued to serve the people of Newquay until 1911 when the New Parish Church was built. After the new church opened, the land where the Chapel of Ease stood was purchased and became the Women's Institute. The land and building was purchased by FW Woolworth and was subsequently demolished for the new Woolworths store to be built in 1937. However, there is still a reminder of the fact that a church once stood here in the footpath, named 'Church Path', which runs from Mount Wise to Bank Street which is still in use today.

=== Newquay Parish church of St Michael the Archangel ===
The new church in Newquay was dedicated to St. Michael the Archangel, was commenced in 1909. the construction carried out throughout 1910 and eventually, after the some setbacks and some last minute issues that the necessary money would be collected in time, the church was completed and was consecrated on 12 July 1911 by the Bishop of Truro. The total cost of the church, including the purchase of the site, was just under £11,000. The church was originally designed by Sir Ninian Comper. Newquay Parish Church of St Michael the Archangel opened in 1911.

Sebastian Comper designed the present church tower, The tower was completed in 1969, nearly 60 years after the church was built. The Tower itself is 64.76 metres (105 feet 6 inches) in height. It was originally intended to contain a peal of bells, but there have never been funds for this or the proposed clock either.

== Vicars ==
- Reginald John Yarde-Buller 1918–1926
- Charles Stanley Fleet 1926–1934
- Henry George Blomfield 1934–1951
- Charles Kelland Peeke 1951–1969
- Harold Ernest Hocking 1969–1974
- John Donald Shepher 1974–1984
- Hugh Martin Williams 1984–1993
- Michael Harry Fisher 1995–1999
- Michael John Adams 1999–2014
- Jeremy S Thorold 2016–2021
- Chris McQuillen-Wright 2022–2024

== Fittings ==
The Church was further modified over the years, with stained glass (some designed by Ninian Comper), by the rood screen, also designed by Comper, which was installed in sections, and by the fine organ by Nicholson of Worcester, which was dedicated in 1961, replacing an old organ of mixed origin. This was the gift of the late Revd W.P.Mitchell, as was the tower. Comper's original plans had included a tower at the east end of the church, which was never built for lack of funds at the time.

== Organ ==
The organ installed in 1911 was second hand from St Ia's Church, St Ives and included pipework from another organ.

This was replaced in 1962 by a new organ by Nicholson of Worcester and Roger Yates following a £15,000 legacy (equivalent to £280,000 in 2025) from Revd. W.P. Mitchell. The old organ was given to St Paul's Church, Penzance and installed there by Hele of Plymouth.

The current organ was installed in 2013 by Lance Foy. A specification of the organ can be found on the National Pipe Organ Register.

== Fire ==
On St Peter's Day, 29 June 1993, there was an arson attack that destroying large sections of the church. The restoration project which followed received a considerate amount of funding from English Heritage, and in collaboration with experts at English Heritage, the practice used its expertise in architectural conservation to complete a substantial repair of the church, restoring it to its former glory. but has since been reopened (rededicated in 1996).
