= Saint Columba (disambiguation) =

Saint Columba (521–597) was an Irish Christian saint who evangelized Scotland.

Saint Columba may also refer to:

== Saints ==
- Columba of Cornwall or Saint Columba the Virgin
- Columba of Sens
- Columba of Spain
- Columba of Terryglass

== Schools ==
- St. Columba's College, Hazaribagh, India
- St Columba's College, Dublin, a co-educational boarding school affiliated with the Church of Ireland in Dublin
- St Columba's College, Essendon, an all-female Catholic secondary school in Melbourne, Australia
- St Columba's College, St Albans, a Catholic independent boys' school in St Albans, England
- St. Columba's High School (disambiguation), multiple schools
- St Columba's Roman Catholic High School, Dunfermline in Scotland
- St. Columba's School, Delhi, India
- St Columba's School, Kilmacolm, Scotland
- St Columba's High School, Gourock, Scotland

== Other ==
- Cathach of St. Columba, an early seventh-century Irish Psalter
- Knights of St Columba, a Scottish Order of Catholic Laymen
- Urney St. Columba's GAC, a Gaelic Athletic Association club in County Tyrone, Northern Ireland
- St. Kolumba, Cologne, a destroyed church in Cologne, Germany, now chapel
- MS Masarrah, a ferry originally named St. Columba, working on the Irish sea
- St. Columba (tune), traditional Irish tune

== See also ==
- St. Columba's Church (disambiguation)
- Columba (disambiguation)
- Columbanus (540–615), also known as St. Columban, was an Irish missionary
- Santa Coloma (disambiguation)
- St Columb (disambiguation)
- St. Columba's Church (disambiguation)
