= Diocese of Truro =

Diocese of the Church of England

Diocese of Truro Dioecesis Truronensis Epskobeth Truru
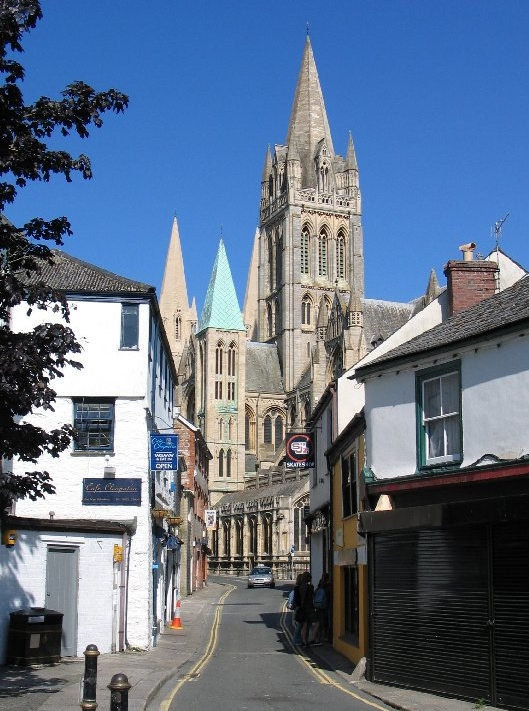
- Truro Cathedral seen from St Mary's Street. It was built between 1880 and 1910.

- Coat of arms

- Flag

Location
- Country: England
- Ecclesiastical province: Canterbury
- Archdeaconries: Bodmin, Cornwall
- Coordinates: 50.240°N 5.018°W

Statistics
- Parishes: 225
- Churches: 313
- Schools: 12 Church of England schools 12 Multi-academy trusts

Information
- Formation: 15 December 1876
- Denomination: Church of England
- Established: 1877
- Cathedral: Truro Cathedral
- Language: English, Cornish

Current leadership
- Bishop: David Williams, Bishop of Truro
- Suffragan: James Treasure, Bishop of St Germans
- Archdeacons: Clive Hogger, Archdeacon of Cornwall; Archdeacon of Bodmin (vacant)

Website
- trurodiocese.org.uk

Bishopric of Truro Act 1876 (Note: Section 1.)
- Act of Parliament
- Parliament of the United Kingdom
- Long title: An Act to provide for the Foundation of a new Bishopric out of a part of the diocese of Exeter.
- Citation: 39 & 40 Vict. c. 54
- Territorial extent: United Kingdom

Dates
- Royal assent: 11 August 1875
- Commencement: 11 August 1875 (Note: The Acts of Parliament (Commencement) Act 1793.)
- Repealed: 18 July 1973

Other legislation
- Amended by: Statute Law Revision Act 1883
- Repealed by: Statute Law (Repeals) Act 1973

Status: Repealed

Text of statute as originally enacted

The Diocese of Truro (established 1876) is a Church of England diocese in the Province of Canterbury which covers Cornwall, the Isles of Scilly and a small part of Devon. The bishop's seat is at Truro Cathedral.

== Geography and history ==
The diocese's area is that of the county of Cornwall, including the Isles of Scilly, as well as two parishes in neighbouring Devon (St Giles on the Heath and Virginstow). It was formed on 15 December 1876 from the Archdeaconry of Cornwall in the Diocese of Exeter. It is, therefore, one of the younger dioceses. The Christian faith, however, has been present in the region since at least the 4th century – more than 100 years before there was an Archbishop of Canterbury. Many of the communities in the diocese, as well as the parish churches, bear a Celtic saint's name, which is a reminder of the links with other Celtic lands, especially Ireland, Wales and Brittany.

The Diocese of Truro is involved directly and indirectly through its Board of Social Responsibility and in the life of its parishes in tackling some of the economic problems that Cornwall is wrestling with and works closely with statutory and voluntary agencies. There are 313 church buildings.

== Bishops ==
David Williams has been the diocesan Bishop of Truro since his confirmation on 28 March 2025; he was previously suffragan Bishop of Basingstoke, in the Diocese of Winchester.

=== Suffragan Bishop ===
The suffragan Bishop of St Germans was created in 1905, and Hugh Nelson was the incumbent until he was translated to Worcester.

=== Provincial Episcopal Visitor ===
The provincial episcopal visitor for conservative evangelical parishes in the diocese which do not accept the ordination of women priests (e.g., St Olaf's Church, Poughill), is the suffragan Bishop of Ebbsfleet. He is licensed as an honorary assistant bishop of the diocese in order to facilitate his ministry. Traditionalist Anglo-Catholic parishes such as St George's Truro that reject the ordination of women receive alternative episcopal oversight from the Bishop of Oswestry (currently Paul Thomas).

=== Other bishops in the Diocese ===
At some periods there have also been assistant bishops, including John Wellington (formerly Bishop of Shantung) and Bill Lash, both retired from sees abroad.

The most recent suffragan Bishop of Plymouth in the neighbouring Diocese of Exeter, John Ford, was also licensed as an honorary assistant bishop in Truro diocese. A former Bishop of St Germans, Roy Screech, lives in St Austell.

== Archdeaconries and deaneries ==
Diocese	Archdeaconries	Rural Deaneries	Paid clergy	Churches	Population	People/clergy	People/church	Churches/clergy
Diocese of Truro	Archdeaconry of Bodmin (est. 1878)	Deanery of Stratton	2	23	21,120	10,560	918	11.5
Diocese of Truro	Archdeaconry of Bodmin (est. 1878)	Deanery of Trigg Major	5	23	19,932	3,986	867	4.6
Diocese of Truro	Archdeaconry of Bodmin (est. 1878)	Deanery of Trigg Minor & Bodmin	9	34	43,004	4,778	1,265	3.78
Diocese of Truro	Archdeaconry of Bodmin (est. 1878)	Deanery of East Wivelshire	5	32	51,370	10,274	1,605	6.4
Diocese of Truro	Archdeaconry of Bodmin (est. 1878)	Deanery of West Wivelshire	5	23	32,799	6,560	1,426	4.6
Diocese of Truro	Archdeaconry of Cornwall	Deanery of Carnmarth North	7.25	20	65,196	8,993	3,260	2.76
Diocese of Truro	Archdeaconry of Cornwall	Deanery of Carnmarth South	9	13	38,709	4,301	2,978	1.44
Diocese of Truro	Archdeaconry of Cornwall	Deanery of Kerrier	5	23	32,104	6,421	1,396	4.6
Diocese of Truro	Archdeaconry of Cornwall	Deanery of Penwith	12	29	64,555	5,380	2,226	2.42
Diocese of Truro	Archdeaconry of Cornwall	Deanery of Powder	17.16	39	51,736	3,015	1,327	2.27
Diocese of Truro	Archdeaconry of Cornwall	Deanery of Pydar	6.59	21	48,867	7,415	2,327	3.19
Diocese of Truro	Archdeaconry of Cornwall	Deanery of St Austell	8	25	65,880	8,235	2,635	3.13
Total/average			91	305	535,272	5,882	1,755	3.35

=== Rural deaneries ===
The names of the older deaneries (before 1875) are based on those of the ancient Hundreds of Cornwall though the boundaries do not always correspond. East and West (Wivelshire) must have originally had a Cornish name but it is not recorded (Wivel may be from an Anglo-Saxon personal name 'Wifel').

The deaneries created in 1875 in the episcopate of Frederick Temple were Bodmin, Stratton, St Austell and Carnmarth. These remained unchanged until Carnmarth was divided; later still in the 1980s some alterations of boundaries occurred. The need for smaller deaneries was caused by the economic growth of Victorian Cornwall, mainly in tin and copper mining, which increased the population and by a greater effort by the church to encourage church membership.

== Coat of arms ==
Coat of arms of the Diocese of Truro

Flag of the Diocese of Truro, consisting of the coat of arms in the canton of a Saint George's Cross

The arms of the diocese include a saltire gules on which are a crossed sword and key: below this is a fleur de lys sable, all surrounded by a border sable charged with 15 bezants. The saltire is the cross of St Patrick, taken to be the emblem of the Celtic church; the sword and key are emblems of St Peter the patron of Exeter Cathedral, and the fleur de lys represents St Mary, patron of the cathedral. The border is derived from the arms of the Duchy of Cornwall. They were designed by the College of Heralds in 1877 and are blazoned thus:

"Argent, on a saltire gules, a key, ward upward, in bend, surmounted by a sword, hilt upward, in bend sinister, both or. In base, a fleur de lys sable. The whole within a bordure sable, fifteen bezants. Ensigned with a mitre."

== 21st century ==
=== Campaign by Fry an Spyrys ===
In 2003 a campaign group was formed called Fry an Spyrys ("Free the Spirit" in Cornish) which is dedicated to disestablishing the Church of England in Cornwall and to reconstituting the Diocese of Truro as an autonomous province of the Anglican Communion. Its most vociferous member is the founder, the Revd Andy Phillips, who also writes under the pen-name "An Bucca". Its chairman is Garry Tregidga of the Institute of Cornish Studies. Phillips states there has been constant speculation that the diocese might be merged back into the Diocese of Exeter for budgetary reasons.

The possibility of a merger was aired unofficially in March 2003, during debate surrounding the formulation of the Dioceses, Pastoral and Mission Measure, which would allow diocesan commissions to make proposals for the reorganisation of dioceses, including their dissolution. However, such a merger has yet to be proposed by any official body within the Church of England. When the possibility was raised by Fry an Spyrys in 2004 it was denied by a Church of England spokesman and also by representatives of the Truro and Exeter dioceses Since then the Diocese of Truro has shown some financial and administrative resilience. Diocesan reorganisation and the People of God campaign rallied human resources and led (by 2007) to a tight but stable financial situation. In 2007, Lord Lloyd of Berwick, chair of Parliament's Ecclesiastical Committee, reported to the House of Lords that there were no plans to abolish the Diocese of Truro and to merge it with the Diocese of Exeter.

=== Jeremy Dowling review ===
A 2018 case review commissioned by the diocese reported that four bishops, Maurice Key, Peter Mumford, Michael Ball and Richard Llewellin, had failed to respond to disclosures of abuse by a leading diocesan figure. The diocese had failed to investigate the accusations against Jeremy Dowling, a lay preacher and synod member, who rose to influential positions including communications officer to the bishop. Dowling was jailed in 2015 for seven years, and again in 2016 for a further eight years, for a series of indecent assaults on boys while teaching at a Cornish school during the 1960s and 1970s. Kim Stevenson, a criminal justice expert, said the report made "sadly familiar reading", and she contrasted the situation in Britain with that in Australia where those who concealed or did not act on evidence of a sexual offence faced prosecution.

== List of churches in the diocese ==
Grade I: buildings of exceptional interest. Grade II*: particularly important buildings of more than special interest. Grade II: buildings that are of special interest, warranting every effort to preserve them.

Last fully updated 26 September 2018.

=== Deanery of Stratton ===
Benefice	Churches	Link	Clergy	Population served	Ref
Boscastle and Tintagel Group, The, Comprising Forrabury, Lesnewth, Otterham, St Juliot, Tintagel, and Trevalga	St Julitta, St Juliot (II*); St Denis, Otterham (II*); St Michael & All Angels, Lesnewth (II*); St Symphorian, Forrabury (II*); St Merteriana, Minster (I); St Petroc, Trevalga (II*); St Materiana, Tintagel (I); St Piran, Trethevy (II)		Priest-in-Charge: Heather Aston	3,426	
Kilkhampton (St James the Great) with Morwenstow	St James the Great, Kilkhampton (I)		Priest-in-Charge/Rector: David Barnes; NSM: Richard Ward-Smith	10,713	
Kilkhampton (St James the Great) with Morwenstow	SS Morwenna & John the Baptist, Morwenstow (I)		Priest-in-Charge/Rector: David Barnes; NSM: Richard Ward-Smith	10,713	
North Kernow Benefice, The, Comprising Bude Haven, Launcells, Marhamchurch, and Stratton	St Michael & All Angels, Bude (II); SS Swithin & Andrew, Launcells (I); St Marwenne, Marhamchurch (I); St Andrew, Stratton (I)		Priest-in-Charge/Rector: David Barnes; NSM: Richard Ward-Smith	10,713	
Poughill (St Olaf King and Martyr)	St Olaf King & Martyr, Poughill (I)		Vicar: Vacant	2,775	
Week St Mary Circle of Parishes (St Mary the Virgin)	St Mary the Virgin, Week St Mary (I); St James, Jacobstow (I); St Gregory, Treneglos (II*); St Werburgh, Warbstow (II*); St Winwaloe, Poundstock (I); Our Lady & St Anne, Widemouth Bay; St Gennys, St Gennys; St Anne, Whitstone (I)		Rector: Vacant	4,206	

=== Deanery of Trigg Major ===
Benefice	Churches	Link	Clergy	Population served	Ref
Boyton (Holy Name), North Tamerton, Werrington, St Giles-In-The-Heath and Virginstow	Holy Name, Boyton (II*); St Denis, North Tamerton (I); St Giles, St Giles-in-the-Heath (II); St Bridget, Virginstow (II); St Martin of Tours, Werrington (I)		Rector: Vacant	1,956	
Egloskerry (St Petrock and St Keri), North Petherwin, Tremaine, Tresmere and Trewen	SS Petrock & Keri, Egloskerry (II); St Paternus, North Petherwin (I); St Winwalo, Tremaine (I); St Nicholas, Tresmere (II*); St Michael, Trewen (II*)		Vicar: Geoffrey Pengelly	1,629	
Launceston (St Mary Magdalene) (St Thomas the Apostle) (St Stephen)	St Mary Magdalene, Launceston (I); St Stephen the Martyr, Launceston (II*); St Thomas the Apostle, Launceston (II*); Christ the Cornerstone, Tregadillett		Team Rector: Vacant; Curate: Teresa Folland; Curate: Alison Hardy	9,152	
Moorland Group, The, Comprising Altarnon, Davidstow, Laneast, and St Clether	St Nonna, Altarnun (I); St David, Davidstow (II*); SS Sidwell & Gulval, Laneast (I); St Clederus, St Clether (II*)		Rector: Deryn Roberts	1,938	
Three Rivers, The, Comprising Lawhitton, Lewannick, Lezant, North Hill, and South Petherwin	St Michael, Lawhitton (II*); St Martin, Lewannick (II*); St Briochus, Lezant (II*); St Torney, North Hill (I); St Paternus, South Petherwin (I)		Curate: Heather West	5,257	

=== Deanery of Trigg Minor & Bodmin ===
Benefice	Churches	Link	Clergy	Population served	Ref
Blisland (St Protus and St Hyacinth) with Temple, St Breward and Helland	SS Protus & Hyacinth, Blisland (I); St Catherine, Temple (II*); St Helena, Helland (II*); St Breward, St Breward (I)		Priest-in-Charge: David Seymour; NSM: Stephen Williams	3,152	
St Tudy (St Tudy) with St Mabyn and Michaelstow	St Tudy, St Tudy (I); St Michael, Michaelstow (I)		Priest-in-Charge: David Seymour; NSM: Stephen Williams	3,152	
St Tudy (St Tudy) with St Mabyn and Michaelstow	St Mabena, St Mabyn (I)		Priest-in-Charge: David Seymour; NSM: Stephen Williams	3,152	
Bodmin (St Petroc) Team Benefice, The, Including Cardynham, Lanhydrock, and Lanivet	St Petroc, Bodmin (I); St Meubred, Cardinham (I); St Hydroc, Lanhydrock (I); Lanivet Parish Church (I); St Stephen, Nanstallon		Team Rector: Paul Holley; Team Vicar: Elaine Munday; Team Vicar: Cynthia Clemow	17,608	
Lanteglos By Camelford (St Julitta) with Advent	St Julitta, Lanteglos-by-Camelford (I)		Priest-in-Charge: Angela Cooper	5,764	
Lanteglos By Camelford (St Julitta) with Advent	St Thomas of Canterbury, Camelford; St Adwena, Advent (I)		Priest-in-Charge: Angela Cooper	5,764	
St Teath (St Teatha)	St Tetha, St Teath (I); St John the Evangelist, Delabole (II)		Priest-in-Charge: Angela Cooper	5,764	
Lostwithiel (St Bartholomew) Parishes	St Brevita, Lanlivery (I)		Priest-in-Charge: Paul Beynon; NSM: Sheila Bawden	4,201	
Lostwithiel (St Bartholomew) Parishes	St Bartholomew, Lostwithiel (I)		Priest-in-Charge: Paul Beynon; NSM: Sheila Bawden	4,201	
Lostwithiel (St Bartholomew) Parishes	Blessed Virgin Mary, Bradoc (I)		Priest-in-Charge: Paul Beynon; NSM: Sheila Bawden	4,201	
Lostwithiel (St Bartholomew) Parishes	St Winnow, St Winnow (I)		Priest-in-Charge: Paul Beynon; NSM: Sheila Bawden	4,201	
Lostwithiel (St Bartholomew) Parishes	Boconnoc Parish Church; St Cyricius, St Veep (I); St Nectan, St Nectan (II*)		Priest-in-Charge: Paul Beynon; NSM: Sheila Bawden	4,201	
North Cornwall Cluster of Churches, Comprising Port Isaac, St Endellion, St Kew, and St Minver with St Enodoc and St Michael Rock	St Peter, Port Isaac; St Endelienta, St Endellion (I); St James the Great, Kew (I); St Enodoc, Trebetherick (I); St Michael, Porthilly; St Menefreda, St Minver (I)		Rector: Elizabeth Wild; NSM: Andrew Lewis	4,410	
St Breoke (St Breoke) and Egloshayle in Wadebridge	St Breoke, St Breoke (II); St Petroc, Egloshayle (I); St Conan, Wadebridge (II)		Rector: Stephen Payne	7,869	

=== Deanery of East Wivelshire ===
Benefice	Churches	Link	Clergy	Population served	Ref
Antony (St James the Great) with Sheviock and Torpoint	St James the Great, Antony (I); Blessed Virgin Mary, Sheviock (I); SS Philip & James, Maryfield (II*); St James, Torpoint (II)		Vicar: Lynn Parker	8,857	
Callington Cluster, The, Including Linkinhorne, South Hill, and Stoke Climsland	St Mary, Callington (I); St Mellor, Linkinhorne (I); St Paul, Upton Cross; St Sampson, South Hill (I); Stoke Climsland Parish Church (II*)		Rector: Tony Stephens; NSM: Annabel King	9,505	
Landrake (St Michael) with St Erney and Botus Fleming	St Michael, Landrake (I); St Erney, St Erney (II*); St Mary, Botus Fleming (II*)		Priest-in-Charge: Cathy Sigrist; NSM (Saltash): Pamela Sellix	18,308	
Saltash (St Nicholas and St Faith)	SS Nicholas & Faith, Saltash (I); St Stephen, St Stephens-by-Saltash (I)		Priest-in-Charge: Cathy Sigrist; NSM (Saltash): Pamela Sellix	18,308	
Rame Peninsula Benefice, The, Comprising Maker with Rame, Millbrook, and St John	St Andrew, Cawsand (II); SS Mary & Julian, Maker (I); St Germanus, Rame (I); All Saints, Millbrook (II); St John the Baptist, St John (I)		Rector: Michael Brown	3,629	
St Germans (St Germans of Auxerre)	St Germanus of Auxerre, St Germans (I); St Nicholas, Downderry (II); St Anne's Church, Hessenford (II); St Luke, Tideford (II)		Vicar: Vacant	2,673	
Tamar Valley Benefice, The, Comprising Calstock, Landulph, St Dominick, and St Mellion with Pillaton	St Andrew, Calstock (I); Cotehele House Chapel (I); St Anne, Gunnislake (II); All Saints, Harrowbarrow (II); SS Leonard & Dilpe, Landulph (I); St Indract's Chapel, Halton Quay; St Dominica, St Dominic (I); St Odulph, Pillaton (I); St Melanus, St Mellion (I)		Rector: Chris Painter	8,398	

=== Deanery of West Wivelshire ===
Benefice	Churches	Link	Clergy	Population served	Ref
Duloe (St Cuby) and Herodsfoot	St Cuby, Duloe (I); All Saints, Herodsfoot (II)		Rector: Vacant	823	
Trelawny, Comprising Lanreath, Lansallos, Lanteglos By Fowey, and Pelynt	St Marnarck, Lanreath (I); St Nun, Pelynt (I); St Ildierna, Lansallos (I); St Wyllow, Lanteglos-by-Fowey (I); St John, Bodinnick; St Saviour, Polruan		Rector: Richard Allen	4,192	
Trelawny, Comprising Lanreath, Lansallos, Lanteglos By Fowey, and Pelynt	St Tallanus, Talland (I); St John the Baptist, Polperro (disused?)		Rector: Richard Allen	4,192	
Looe (St Nicholas) and Morval	St Nicholas, West Looe (II*); St Martin, St Martin-by-Looe (I)		Rector: Ben Morgan-Lundie	6,391	
Looe (St Nicholas) and Morval	St Wenna, Morval (I)		Rector: Ben Morgan-Lundie	6,391	
Liskeard (St Martin) and St Keyne	St Martin, Liskeard (II*); St Keyna, St Keyne		Vicar: Vacant*	12,571	
Menheniot (St Lalluwy and St Antoninus)	SS Lalluwy & Antoninus, Menheniot (I); St Mary, Merrymeet (II)		Vicar: Becca Bell; Curate (St Ive): Li Selman	4,372	
St Ive (St Ive) and Pensilva with Quethiock	St Ive, St Ive (I); St Hugh, Quethiock (I); St John, Pensilva		Vicar: Becca Bell; Curate (St Ive): Li Selman	4,372	
St Cleer (St Clarus)	St Clarus, St Cleer (I)		Vicar: Becca Bell; Hon. Curate: Li Selman	4,450	
St Neot (St Neot) and Warleggan	St Neot, St Neot (I); St Bartholomew, Warleggan (II*)		Vicar: Becca Bell; Hon. Curate: Li Selman	4,450	

=== Deanery of Carnmarth North ===
Benefice	Churches	Link	Clergy	Population served	Ref
Camborne (St Martin and St Meriadoc), Tuckingmill and Penponds	SS Martin & Meriadoc, Camborne (I)		Rector: Vacant; NSM: Neil Potter	20,004	
Camborne (St Martin and St Meriadoc), Tuckingmill and Penponds	All Saints, Tuckingmill (II)		Rector: Vacant; NSM: Neil Potter	20,004	
Camborne (St Martin and St Meriadoc), Tuckingmill and Penponds	Holy Trinity, Penponds (II)		Rector: Vacant; NSM: Neil Potter	20,004	
Chacewater (St Paul) with St Day and Carharrack	St Paul, Chacewater (II); St Piran, Carharrack; Holy Trinity, St Day		Priest-in-Charge: Simon Bone; Curate: Karen Jones; Curate: Richard Wallis; NSM: Steven Fletcher	10,230	
St Stythians (St Stythian) with Perranarworthal and Gwennap	St Wenappa, Gwennap (I); St Piran, Perranarworthal (II*); St Stythian, Stithians (II*)		Priest-in-Charge: Simon Bone; Curate: Karen Jones; Curate: Richard Wallis; NSM: Steven Fletcher	10,230	
Crowan (St Crewenna) and Treslothan	St Crewenna, Crowan (II*)		Vicar: Vacant	4,999	
Crowan (St Crewenna) and Treslothan	St James, Leedstown; St John the Evangelist, Treslothan (II)		Vicar: Vacant	4,999	
Redruth (St Andrew) (St Euny) with Lanner and Treleigh	St Andrew, Redruth (II); St Euny, Redruth (II*); Christ Church, Lanner; St Andrew, Pencoys (II); St Stephen, Treleigh (II)		Team Rector: Caspar Bush; Team Vicar: Eliska Mulliner; Curate: Graham Adamson	18,672	
St Illogan (St Illogan)	St Illogan, Illogan (II); St Mary, Portreath; St Illogan, Trevenson (II)		Rector: Steven Robinson; Curate: Alex Sharp; NSM: Marlene Carveth	11,291	

=== Deanery of Carnmarth South ===
Benefice	Churches	Link	Clergy	Population served	Ref
Budock (St Budock)	St Budock, Budock (II*)		Vicar: Godfrey Bennett; Curate: Ben Morgan Lundie	7,092	
Falmouth (All Saints)	All Saints, Falmouth (II*)		Priest-in-Charge: Bill Stuart-White; Curate: Chris Hassell	6,916	
Falmouth (King Charles the Martyr)	King Charles the Martyr, Falmouth (II*)		Priest-in-Charge: Steve Tudgey	4,631	
Mabe (St Laudus)	St Laudus, Mabe (II*); St Michael & All Angels, Ponsanooth		Priest-in-Charge: Steve Smith; Curate: Amanda Evans	4,293	
Mawnan (St Mawnan) (St Michael)	SS Mawnan & Stephen, Mawnan (II*); St Michael's Chapel, Mawnan		Priest-in-Charge: Johanna Clare	1,238	
Mylor (St Mylor) with Flushing	St Mylor, Mylor (I); All Saints, Mylor Bridge		NSM: Andrew Stevenson; NSM: Jeffrey James	2,705	
Mylor (St Mylor) with Flushing	St Peter, Flushing (II)		NSM: Andrew Stevenson; NSM: Jeffrey James	2,705	
Penwerris (St Michael and All Angels) (Holy Spirit)	St Michael & All Angels, Penwerris; Holy Spirit, Penwerris		Priest-in-Charge: Vacant	4,507	
St Gluvias (St Gluvias)	St Gluvias, St Gluvias (II*)		Vicar: Steve Wales	7,327	

=== Deanery of Kerrier ===
Benefice	Churches	Link	Clergy	Population served	Ref
Constantine (St Constantine)	St Constantine, Constantine (I); Gweek Mission Church		Priest-in-Charge: Stewart Turner	2,233	
Helston (St Michael) and Wendron	St Michael, Helston (II*); St Wendrona, Wendron (I); St Christopher, Porkellis		Team Rector: David Miller; OLM: Dorothy Noakes	13,351	
Kerrier, West, Comprising Breage with Godolphin and Ashton, Porthleven, Sithney, and St Germoe	Annunciation, Ashton (closed 2020s); St Breaca, Breage (I); St Bartholomew, Porthleven; St Sithney, Sithney (I); St Germoe, Germoe (I)		Vicar: Peter Johnson	7,530	
Meneage (St Anthony) (St Martin) (St Mawgan)	SS Manaccus & Dunstan, Manaccan (I); St Anthony, St Anthony-in-Meneage (I); St Martin, St Martin-in-Meneage (II*); St Mawgan, St Mawgan-in-Meneage (grade unknown)		Rector: Vacant	2,415	
Mullion (St Mellanus) and Cury with Gunwalloe	St Mellanus, Mullion (I); St Corentine, Cury (I); St Winwalloe, Gunwalloe (I)		Vicar: Shane Griffiths	2,715	
St Keverne (St Keverne), St Ruan with St Grade and Landewednack	St Keverne, St Keverne (I); St Wynwallow, Landewednack (I); St Peter, Coverack; St Mary, Cadgwith; St Grada & Holy Cross, Grade (I); St Rumon, Ruan Minor (II*)		Rector: Peter Sharpe	3,860	

=== Deanery of Penwith ===
Benefice	Churches	Link	Clergy	Population served	Ref
Carbis Bay (St Anta and All Saints) with Lelant (St Uny)	St Anta & All Saints, Carbis Bay; St Uny, Lelant (II*)		Priest-in-Charge: Suzanne Hosking; NSM: Carlyn Wilton	5,055	
Godrevy, Comprising Gwinear, Hayle, Phillack, and St Erth	St Winnear, Gwinear (I); St Elwyn, Hayle (II*); St Gothian, Gwithian (II*); SS Felicitas & Piala, Phillack (II*); St Erth, St Erth (I)		Team Rector: Sharon Clifton; NSM: Patricia Murley; NSM: Sharon Chalcraft	13,573	
Gulval (St Gulval) and Madron	St Gulval, Gulval (II*); St Maddern, Madron (I); St Thomas, Heamoor		Vicar: Tim Hawkins; NSM: Peter Butterfield; NSM: Joanna Thomas	7,637	
Ludgvan (St Ludgvan and St Paul), Marazion, St Hilary and Perranuthnoe	SS Ludgvan & Paul, Ludgvan (II*); All Saints, Marazion (II); SS Michael & Piran, Perranuthnoe (II*); St Hilary, St Hilary (II*)		Rector: Nigel Marns; Curate: Kirsten Norfolk; NSM: Linda Garthwaite	7,298	
Newlyn (St Peter)	St Peter, Newlyn		Priest-in-Charge: Keith Owen^{1}	3,543	
Paul (St Pol De Lion)	St Pol-de-Leon, Paul (II)		Priest-in-Charge: Andrew Yates^{1}	2,591	
Penzance (St Mary) (St Paul) (St John the Baptist)	St Mary the Virgin, Penzance (II); St John the Baptist, Penzance (II)		Team Rector: Sian Yates^{1}	9,299	
Pendeen (St John the Baptist) with Morvah	St John the Baptist, Pendeen; St Morwetha or St Bridget of Sweden, Morvah (II)		Priest-in-Charge: Karsten Wedgewood	5,444	
Sancreed (St Creden)	St Creden, Sancreed (II*)		Priest-in-Charge: Karsten Wedgewood	5,444	
St Just in Penwith (St Just)	St Just, St Just-in-Penwith (II*)		Priest-in-Charge: Karsten Wedgewood	5,444	
St Buryan (St Buriana), St Levan and Sennen	St Buriana, St Buryan (I)		Rector: Vanda Rowe	2,768	
St Buryan (St Buriana), St Levan and Sennen	St Levan, St Levan (I)		Rector: Vanda Rowe	2,768	
St Buryan (St Buriana), St Levan and Sennen	St Sennen, Sennen (II*)		Rector: Vanda Rowe	2,768	
St Ives (St Ia the Virgin)	St Ia the Virgin, St Ives (I)		Vicar: Nick Widdows	6,688	
St Ives (St Ia the Virgin)	St John the Evangelist, Halsetown		Vicar: Nick Widdows	6,688	
Towednack (St Tewinock)	St Tewinock, Towednack (II*)		Priest-in-Charge: Elizabeth Foot	659	
Zennor (St Senera)	St Senara, Zennor (I)		Priest-in-Charge: Elizabeth Foot	659	

^{1}also licensed as curates in each other's parishes

=== Deanery of Powder ===
Benefice	Churches	Link	Clergy	Population served	Ref
Gerrans (St Gerran) with St Anthony-In-Roseland and Philleigh	St Gerran, Gerrans (I); St Philleigh, Philleigh (I)		Hon. Priest-in-Charge: Jill Edwards	949	
Highertown, Truro (All Saints) and Baldhu	All Saints, Highertown		Priest-in-Charge: Jeremy Putnam	7,618	
Isles of Scilly: St Mary's, St Agnes, St Martin's, Bryher and Tresco	St Mary, St Mary's (II); Old St Mary's Church, St Mary's (II*); St Agnes, St Agnes (Scilly) (II); All Saints, Bryher (II); St Martin, St Martin's (II); St Nicholas, Tresco		Chaplain: Perran Gay; Curate: Eileen Martin	2,203	
Kea (All Hallows) (Old Church)	All Hallows, St Kea (II*); St Kea Old Church (II*)		Priest-in-Charge: Marc Baker	1,134	
Kenwyn (St Keyne) with St Allen	St Keyne, Kenwyn (II*); St Alleyne, St Allen (II*)		Rector: Christopher Parsons; OLM: Bob Humphries	3,227	
Probus (St Probus and St Grace), Ladock and Grampound with Creed and St Erme	St Crida, Creed (I)		Team Rector: Joachim Foot; Team Vicar: Ellen Goldsmith; NSM: Linda Whetter; Hon. Curate: Mary Richards	5,929	
Probus (St Probus and St Grace), Ladock and Grampound with Creed and St Erme	St Ladoca, Ladock (I)		Team Rector: Joachim Foot; Team Vicar: Ellen Goldsmith; NSM: Linda Whetter; Hon. Curate: Mary Richards	5,929	
Probus (St Probus and St Grace), Ladock and Grampound with Creed and St Erme	SS Probus & Grace, Probus (I); St Nun, Grampound (II); St Hermes, St Erme (II*)		Team Rector: Joachim Foot; Team Vicar: Ellen Goldsmith; NSM: Linda Whetter; Hon. Curate: Mary Richards	5,929	
St Just-In-Roseland (St Just) and St Mawes	St Just, St Just-in-Roseland (I); St Mawes, St Mawes (II)		Priest-in-Charge: Vacant; Curate: Arwen Folkes	1,069	
Tregony (Not Known) with St Cuby and Cornelly	St Cuby, Tregony (I); St Cornelius, Cornelly (I)		Priest-in-Charge: Emma Watson	960	
St Michael Penkevil (St Michael)	St Michael, St Michael Penkevil (I)		Priest-in-Charge: Lynda Barley	811	
Tresillian (Holy Trinity) and Lamorran with Merther	Holy Trinity, Tresillian (II)		Priest-in-Charge: Lynda Barley	811	
Tresillian (Holy Trinity) and Lamorran with Merther	St Moran, Lamorran (II*)		Priest-in-Charge: Lynda Barley	811	
Truro (St Mary's Cathedral and Parish Church)	St Mary's Cathedral, Truro		Dean: Roger Bush; Canon/Hon. Curate: Alan Bashforth; Canon/Curate: Lynda Barley (see above); Canon: Simon Griffiths	264	
Truro St Paul (St George the Martyr) (St John the Evangelist)	St John the Evangelist, Truro (II); St George the Martyr, Truro (II); St Paul's Church in the School, Truro		Vicar: Christopher Epps	13,657	
Veryan (St Symphorian) with Ruan Lanihorne	St Rumon, Ruan Lanihorne (I)		Priest-in-Charge: Philip Greenhalgh	1,226	
Veryan (St Symphorian) with Ruan Lanihorne	St Symphorian, Veryan (I)		Priest-in-Charge: Philip Greenhalgh	1,226	
Veryan (St Symphorian) with Ruan Lanihorne	All Saints, Portloe (II)		Priest-in-Charge: Philip Greenhalgh	1,226	
Devoran (St John the Evangelist and St Petroc)	SS John the Evangelist & Petroc, Devoran (II)		Priest-in-Charge: Simon Bone (see above); Curate: Karen Jones (see above); Curate: Richard Wallis (see above); NSM: Steven Fletcher (see above)	3,785	
Feock (St Feock)	St Feock, Feock (II*)		Priest-in-Charge: Simon Bone (see above); Curate: Karen Jones (see above); Curate: Richard Wallis (see above); NSM: Steven Fletcher (see above)	3,785	
St Clement (St Clement)	St Clement, St Clement (I)		Vicar: Diane Willoughby	539	
St Clement (St Clement)	St Andrew, Malpas		Vicar: Diane Willoughby	539	
St Agnes (St Agnes) and Mount Hawke with Mithian	St Agnes, St Agnes (Cornwall) (II*)		Priest-in-Charge: Anne Brown (see below); Curate: Diane Willoughby (see above); Curate: Rachel Monie (see below)	8,365	
St Agnes (St Agnes) and Mount Hawke with Mithian	St John the Baptist, Mount Hawke; Soul Church, Porthtowan		Priest-in-Charge: Anne Brown (see below); Curate: Diane Willoughby (see above); Curate: Rachel Monie (see below)	8,365	

=== Deanery of Pydar ===
Benefice	Churches	Link	Clergy	Population served	Ref
Lann Pydar Benefice, The, Comprising St Columb Major, St Ervan, St Eval, and St Mawgan-In-Pydar	St Columba, St Columb Major (I); St Ervan, St Ervan (II*); St Uvelas, St Eval (I); St Mawgan, St Mawgan (I)		Rector: Helen Baber; Curate: Tess Lowe	7,335	
Newlyn (St Newlyn)	St Newlina, St Newlyn East (II*)		Priest-in-Charge: Hilary Samson	6,196	
St Enoder (St Enoder)	St Enoder, St Enoder (I); St Francis, Indian Queens		Priest-in-Charge: Hilary Samson	6,196	
Newquay (St Michael)	St Michael the Archangel, Newquay (II*)		Priest-in-Charge: Jeremy Thorold; NSM: Patricia Kneebone	12,339	
Padstow (St Petroc), St Merryn and St Issey with St Petroc Minor	St Petroc, Padstow (I); St Saviour, Trevone		Rector: Vacant	5,288	
Padstow (St Petroc), St Merryn and St Issey with St Petroc Minor	St Issey, St Issey (I); St Petroc, Little Petherick (I); St Merryn, St Merryn (II*)		Rector: Vacant	5,288	
St Wenn (St Wenna) and Withiel	St Wenna, St Wenn (I); St Clement, Withiel (I)		NSM: Elke Deeley	706	
St Columb Minor (St Columba) and St Colan	St Columba, St Columb Minor (I); St Colan, St Colan (I)		Priest-in-Charge: Christopher McQuillen-Wright; Curate: Jeremy Thorold (see above)	9,611	
Perranzabuloe (St Piran) and Crantock with Cubert	St Piran, Perranzabuloe (II*); St Michael, Perranporth; St Carantoc, Crantock (I); St Cubert, Cubert (grade unknown)		Priest-in-Charge: Anne Brown; Curate: Diane Willoughby (see above); Curate: Rachel Monie	7,392	

=== Deanery of St Austell ===
Benefice	Churches	Link	Clergy	Population served	Ref
Boscoppa (St Luke)	St Luke, Boscoppa		Priest-in-Charge: Juliet Williams	12,111	
Luxulyan (St Cyrus and St Julietta)	SS Cyrus & Julietta, Luxulyan (I)		Priest-in-Charge: Juliet Williams	12,111	
St Blazey (St Blaise)	St Blaise, St Blazey (II*)		Priest-in-Charge: Juliet Williams	12,111	
Charlestown (St Paul)	St Paul, Charlestown (II)		Priest-in-Charge: David Isiorho	11,485	
Par (St Mary the Virgin) (Good Shepherd)	St Mary the Virgin, Par (II); Good Shepherd, Par		Priest-in-Charge: David Isiorho	11,485	
Tywardreath (St Andrew) with Tregaminion	St Andrew, Tywardreath (II); Tregaminion Chapel of Ease (II*)		Priest-in-Charge: David Isiorho	11,485	
Fowey (St Fimbarrus)	St Fimbarrus, Fowey (I)		Priest-in-Charge: Carol Edleston	2,482	
St Sampson (St Sampson)	St Sampson, Golant (I)		Priest-in-Charge: Shona Hoad	2,482	
Roche (St Gomonda of the Rock)	St Gomonda of the Rock, Roche (II*)		Priest-in-Charge: Kenneth Arthur	12,648	
St Dennis (St Denys)	St Denys, St Dennis (II*)		Priest-in-Charge: Kenneth Arthur	12,648	
Treverbyn (St Peter)	St Peter, Treverbyn (II)		Priest-in-Charge: Kenneth Arthur	12,648	
St Austell (Holy Trinity)	Holy Trinity, St Austell (I); All Saints, Pentewan (II*); St Levan, Porthpean		Vicar: Howard Flint; Curate: Ian Gulland	12,557	
St Goran (St Goranus) with Caerhays	St Goranus, Gorran Churchtown (II*); St Michael, St Michael Caerhays (I); St Just, Goran Haven (II*)		Hon. Priest-in-Charge: Elizabeth Charlton	1,448	
St Mewan (St Mewan) with Mevagissey and St Ewe	St Mewan, St Mewan (II*); St Peter, Mevagissey (II); All Saints, St Ewe (I); St Mark, Sticker		Rector: Marion Barrett	6,272	
St Stephen in Brannel (Not Known)	St Stephen, St Stephen-in-Brannel (I); St George, Nanpean		Priest-in-Charge: Emma Westermann-Childs	6,877	

== Benefices by population ==
Benefice	Deanery	Population	Churches	Clergy (Nov 2025)
Kerrier	Kerrier	33,164	21	1 Tm Rc, 1 Tm Vc, Vacancy, 1 NSM, 1 H. Cur
Towan Blystra // St Wenn and Withiel	Pydar	29,168	7	Vacant, 1 BMO Minister
Camborne, Tuckingmill, Penponds // Crowan, Treslothan	Carnmarth N	28,241	5	1 Joint Rector/Vicar, 0.25 Jt Curate, 1 NSM
Falmouth	Carnmarth S	22,345	5	Vacant, 1 Curate, 1 Hon. Curate
St Austell	St Austell	21,072	4	1 Vicar
Redruth	Carnmarth N	20,363	5	1 Team Rector, 1.25 Curates
Charlestown // Par // St Blazey // Treverbyn	St Austell	20,081	5	1 Joint Priest-in-Charge
Bodmin	Trigg Min & Bd	19,693	5	1 Team Rector, 1 Team Vicar, 1 Curate
Landrake with St Erney and Botus Fleming // Saltash	East Wivelshire	18,109	5	1 Joint Priest-in-Charge, 0.25 Curate, 1 NSM
Atlantic Coast	Pydar	17,829	6	1 Vicar, 1 NSM
Penryn	Carnmarth S	15,922	6	1 Vicar, 1 NSM
Godrevy	Penwith	14,958	5	1 Priest-in-Charge, 2 NSMs
Rame and River	East Wivelshire	14,924	13	Vacant, 0.25 Curate, 1 NSM
Penzance // Newlyn // Paul	Penwith	14,866	4	Vacant
Liskeard and St Keyne	West Wivelshire	14,378	2	1 Vicar
St Illogan	Carnmarth N	12,849	3	1 Rector, 0.25 Curate
Lann Pydar	Pydar	12,519	6	1 Rector, 1 Curate
North Kernow	Stratton	11,182	5	1 Rector, 1 NSM
St Stephen-In-Brannel and St Mewan	St Austell	11,035	4	1 Rector
Truro St John the Evangelist	Powder	10,775	1	1 Priest-in-Charge
Callington	East Wivelshire	9,716	5	Vacant, 0.25 Curate
The Five Saints	Carnmarth N	9,537	5	1 Vicar, 0.25 Curate
Highertown and Baldhu	Powder	9,527	1	Vacant (since 2022)
Tamar Valley	East Wivelshire	8,893	9	Vacant, 0.25 Curate
Luxulyan // St Dennis and Roche	St Austell	8,781	3	1 Joint Priest-in-Charge
Truro St George // Penwerris (Bishop of Oswestry)	Carn S/Powder	8,362	3	1 Joint Vicar/Priest-in-Charge
St Breoke and Egloshayle in Wadebridge	Trigg Min & Bd	8,137	3	1 Rector
Launceston with Boyton	Trigg Major	8,012	6	1 Priest-in-Charge, 1 NSM
Prob, Lado, Gramp, Creed, St Erm // Tresil, Lam, Merth	Powder	7,945	7	1 Joint Priest-in-Charge, 1 NSM
Gulval and Madron	Penwith	7,882	3	1 Priest-in-Charge, 2 NSMs
Many Rivers	Trigg Major	7,863	7	1 Rector, 1 NSM
Tribute	West Wivelshire	7,854	5	1 Rector
Mount's Bay	Penwith	7,603	4	Vacant, 1 Curate, 2 NSMs
Looe Valley	West Wivelshire	7,489	5	1 Rector, 1 Curate
Camel-Allen	Trigg Min & Bd	6,406	5	1 Rector
St Ives	Penwith	5,986	2	1 Vicar
Bude Coast and Country	Stratton	5,565	6	1 Rector
Moorland, Egloskerry and Lanstephen	Trigg Major	5,426	8	1 Priest-in-Charge, 1 NSM
Boscastle	Stratton	5,415	12	1 Rector
Waterside	Powder	5,327	3	Vacant
Padstow, St Merryn and St Issey with St Petroc Minor	Pydar	5,130	5	1 Rector, 1 Curate
Carbis Bay with Lelant	Penwith	5,044	2	1 Priest-in-Charge
Pendeen with Morvah // St Just in Penwith	Penwith	4,760	3	1 Joint Priest-in-Charge
Lostwithiel	Trigg Min & Bd	4,502	7	Vacant
Trelawny	West Wivelshire	4,494	7	1 Rector
Roseland	Powder	4,247	9	1 Team Rector, 1 NSM
North Cornwall	Trigg Min & Bd	3,972	6	1 Priest-in-Charge, 1 Curate
Kenwyn with St Allen	Powder	3,971	2	Vacant (since 2022)
Dodman Cross	St Austell	3,845	5	1 Rector
Camelside	Trigg Min & Bd	3,435	7	1 Rector
St Buryan, St Levan and Sennen	Penwith	2,814	3	1 Priest-in-Charge
St Sampson // Tywardreath with Tregaminion	St Austell	2,667	3	1 Joint Priest-in-Charge
Fowey	St Austell	2,131	1	Vacant (since 2020), 1 Curate
Isles of Scilly	Powder	2,051	6	1 Chaplain
Kea	Powder	1,322	2 (4)	1 Vicar, 2 Curates, 1 NSM
St Neot and Warleggan	West Wivelshire	1,151	2	1 Vicar
St Clement	Powder	800	2	1 Vicar (also Curate in Atlantic Coast)
Sancreed	Penwith	618	1	Vacant (since 2016)
Towednack // Zennor	Penwith	605	2	Vacant
Truro Cathedral	Powder	290	1	1 Rector, 1 Hon. Curate, (1 Canon)
St Michael Penkevil	Powder	56	1	Vacant (since 2020)

There are a total of 61 benefices (counting multiple benefices held simultaneously by the same cleric as one).

== Deaneries by population ==
Deanery	Population	Churches	Clergy	Popn. per stip. cl.
Carnmarth North	70,990	18	3 Rectors, 1 Vicar, 2 Curates, 1 NSM	11,832
St Austell	69,612	25	2 Rectors, 1 Vicar, 3 Priests-in-Charge, 1 Curate	9,945
Penwith	65,136	29	1 Vicar, 5 Priests-in-Charge, 1 Curate, 6 NSMs	9,305
Pydar	64,646	24	2 Rectors, 1 Vicar, 1 Minister, 2 Curates, 1 NSM	10,774
East Wivelshire	51,642	32	1 Priest-in-Charge, 1 Curate, 2 NSMs	25,821
Powder	49,950	36 (38)	2 Rectors, 2 Vicars, 2.5 Prs-in-Charge, 2 Curates, 1 Chaplain, 3 NSMs, 1 H.C.	5,258
Trigg Minor & Bodmin	46,145	33	4 Rectors, 1 Vicar, 1 Priest-in-Charge, 2 Curates	5,768
Carnmarth South	42,990	13	1.5 Vicars, 1 Curate, 1 NSM, 1 Hon. Curate	17,196
West Wivelshire	35,366	21	3 Rectors, 2 Vicars, 1 Curate	5,894
Kerrier	33,164	21	1 Rector, 1 Vicar, 1 NSM, 1 Hon. Curate	16,582
Stratton	22,162	23	3 Rectors, 1 NSM	7,387
Trigg Major	21,301	21	1 Rector, 2 Priests-in-Charge, 3 NSMs	7,100
Totals	573,104	296	62 stipendiary clergy, 22 non-stipendiary	average: 9,244

== Archdeaconries by population ==
Archdeaconry	Population	Churches	Clergy	Popn. per stip. cl.
Cornwall	326,876	141	33 stipendiary, 16 non-stipendiary	9,905
Bodmin	246,228	155	29 stipendiary, 6 non-stipendiary	8,491

== See also ==
- Truro Cathedral School
