= Columba (disambiguation) =

Columba (521–597) was an Irish prince who evangelised the Picts, and is one of the patron saints of Scotland.

Columba may also refer to:

== Astronomy ==
- Columba (constellation)
- Columba (Chinese astronomy), a constellation

== People ==
- Columba (given name)

== Ships ==
- RMS Columba, a Clyde paddle steamer launched in 1878
- MV Columba, a car ferry later converted to the cruise ship MV Hebridean Princess

== Schools ==
- Columba Catholic College, Queensland, Australia
- Columba College, Dunedin, New Zealand

== Other uses ==
- Columba (genus), a genus of doves and pigeons
- Columba Project or Columba Initiative, a Gaelic language social program
- Book of Columba or Book of Kells, an illuminated manuscript Gospel book

== See also ==
- Beta Columbae, a star
- Colomba (disambiguation)
- Columbanus
- Columbarium
- Columbia (disambiguation)
- Columbo (disambiguation)
- Kolumba, a museum of Christian art on Cologne, Germany
- St Columb (disambiguation)
- Saint Columba (disambiguation)
- Source Columba, a World War II intelligence operation involving pigeons
