= St Columba's Church, St Columb Major =

Church of Saint Columba
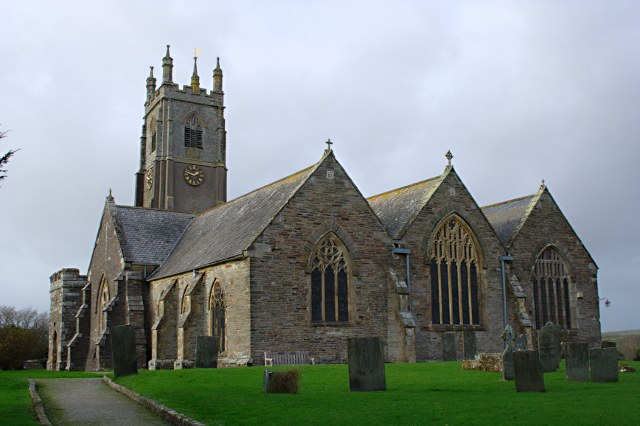

- Location within Cornwall
- 50°26′08.5″N 04°56′25.1″W
- OS grid reference: SW 91297 63675
- Location: St Columb Major
- Country: England
- Denomination: Church of England
- Website: Lannpydar.org.uk

History
- Dedication: Saint Columba the Virgin

Specifications
- Materials: Slatestone rubble with granite dressings

Administration
- Province: Canterbury
- Diocese: Truro
- Deanery: Pydar
- Parish: St Columb Major

Clergy
- Rector: Revd. Helen Baber

Listed Building – Grade I
- Official name: Church of St Columba
- Designated: 10 February 1967
- Reference no.: 1144068

St Columba's Church is a 14th-century, Grade I listed parish church in the Church of England Diocese of Truro in St Columb Major, Cornwall. In 1860 plans were drawn up by William Butterfield, in hope of St Columb church becoming the cathedral of the future diocese of Cornwall, but the cathedral was built at Truro. A second church dedicated to the same saint is known as St Columba's Church, St Columb Minor.

== History ==
The current church dates from the 13th to 15th centuries. The font is Norman and there are many good examples of woodcarving in the church: these include the bench ends dated 1510, the rood screen, wagon roofs, and a 19th-century carved wooden pulpit.

In 1676 three youths set fire to a barrel of gunpowder, killing themselves and causing £350 worth of damage to the church. Through public donations and a small parish rate the church was repaired within nine months.

== Parish status ==
The church is in the Lann Pydar joint benefice with:

- St Ervan Church
- St Eval Church
- St Mawgan Church

== Organ ==
The organ dates from 1870 and was built by Bryceson & Ellis of Lincoln. A specification of the organ can be found in the National Pipe Organ Register.

== Font ==
The octagonal stone font in south aisle, of circa 1300 with carved sides, including five men's faces, on stem with clustered outer shafts.

== Bells ==
According to the National Bell register, there are eight bells dating from 1776 to 1950. The earliest bells are by J C & W Pennington of Exeter. (1776). The later ones are by John Taylor & Co, (1950 & 1969). One bell from 1825 is by John Rudhall. The bells were overhauled in 1950 by Loughborough Bellfoundry. The heaviest of the bells is the tenor, which weighs 1404 lb or 637 kg.

== Memorials ==
Some of the more interesting items are some fine monumental brasses and memorials, including:

- Sir John Arundell (1474–1545), KB, of Lanherne, St. Mawgan-in-Pyder, Cornwall, "the most important man in the county", Receiver-General of the Duchy of Cornwall, perhaps not buried here. His brass was described by Dunkin (1882) as "perhaps the most elaborate and interesting brass to be found in Cornwall"
- Eleanor Grey wife of the above John Arundell. She was granddaughter of Elizabeth Woodville, who was Queen consort of England as the spouse of King Edward IV
- Sir John Arundell, 1591, and his wife (died 1602, brass engraved 1635)
- John Arundell and his wife, 1633 (on the same stone).
- Robert Hoblyn was a Member of Parliament for Bristol who died at Nanswhyden House on 17 November 1756. His monument in St Columb Church bears a long inscription.
- Sir Richard Bellings (1622 – 30 October 1716) was an Irish courtier who served as the Knight secretary to Catherine of Braganza, the wife of King Charles II.

=== War memorial ===
The granite war memorial, erected in 1920, was designed to represent a classic Cornish cross. It names 55 men connected to the parish who lost their lives in the first and second world wars

== Other features ==
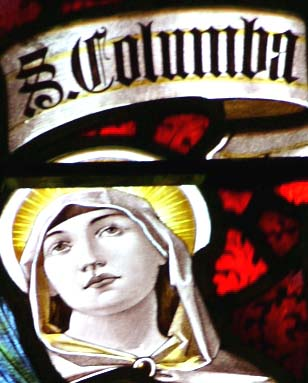
Stained glass window at St. Columb Major church (detail)

The east window and the fine oak vestry screen were done c 1906 by the architect George Fellowes Prynne. "St Columb screen". There are some exceptional oak bench-ends, dating as far back as 1510. The fine organ is by Bryceston Bros. & Ellis of London and a copy of the "Letter of Thanks" to the Cornish people sent by Charles I in 1643 (similar copies are found in many Cornish churches). There are also two sculptures by the artist Allan G. Wyon and a stained glass window portraying Saint Columba the Virgin. In the churchyard is St Columba's Cross.
