= St Columb =

St Columb may refer to:

- Columba or St Columb of Scotland
- St Columb's Cathedral, Derry, Northern Ireland
- St Columb's College, Derry, Northern Ireland
- Columba the Virgin or Saint Columba the Virgin or St Columb of Cornwall
- St Columb Canal, in Cornwall, England
- St Columb Major, town in Cornwall, England
- St Columb Minor, village in Cornwall, England
- St Columb Road, village in Cornwall, England
- St Columb Porth, Cornwall, seaside village in Cornwall
- Lady Dona St Columb, a character in Frenchman's Creek by Daphne du Maurier
- The Monastery of St Columb, a book by Regina Maria Roche

== See also ==
- Saint Columba (disambiguation)
- Santa Coloma (disambiguation)
