= St Piran's Church, Perranarworthal =

St Piran's Church
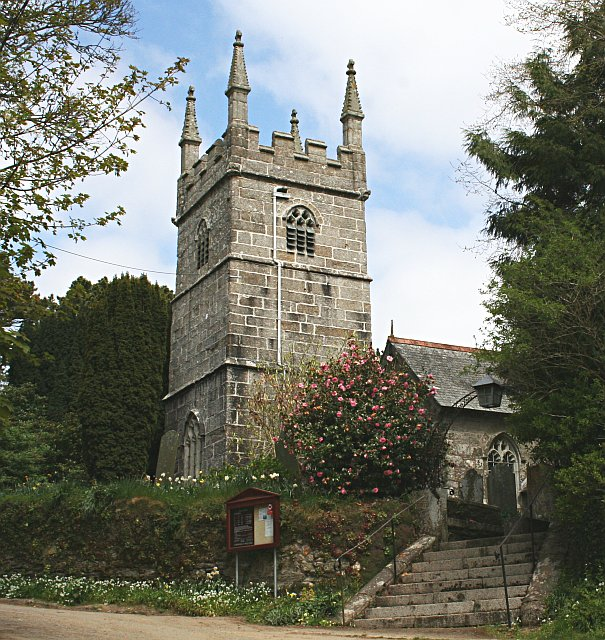
- St Piran's Church
- St Piran's Church
- 50.208°N 5.114°W
- Location: Perranarworthal, Cornwall
- Country: England
- Denomination: Anglican
- Website: St Piran's Church

History
- Status: Parish church
- Dedication: St Piran

Architecture
- Functional status: Active
- Architectural type: Church
- Style: Gothic Revival

Specifications
- Materials: Granite

Administration
- Diocese: Truro
- Archdeaconry: Cornwall
- Deanery: Carnmarth, North
- Parish: Stithians with Perranarworthal

Listed Building – Grade II*
- Official name: Church of Saint Piran
- Designated: 30 May 1967
- Reference no.: 1141586

St Piran's Church is an active Anglican parish church in Perranarworthal, Cornwall, England. It is part of a united benefice consisting of eight churches, the Eight Saints Cluster, in the parishes of Stithians with Perran-Ar-Worthal and Gwennap. The benefice has four licensed clergy and four readers. The church, dedicated to Saint Piran, is in the Carnmarth, North deanery, the archdeaconry of Cornwall and the Diocese of Truro. The church was granted Grade II* listed status in May 1967. The churchyard contains several listed chest tombs and headstones.

== History ==
A Norman chapel possibly existed on the site of the church as evidenced by the tympanum over the south door. A church was built in the 15th century, of which only the tower remains. The chancel was rebuilt in 1842 and again in 1882 when the nave, aisle and porch were rebuilt by James Piers St Aubyn. A vestry was added in the 20th century.

== Architecture ==
=== Exterior ===
The tower is built of granite ashlar and the rest of the church is constructed of killas rubble with dressed granite details. It is roofed with Delabole slate.

The west tower has three stages divided by string courses and an embattled parapet with pinnacles at each corner. The tower's original belfry three-light openings have hood moulds with arches above them. Its perpendicular Gothic openings have slate louvres and quatrefoil tracery. Its four-centred doorway has a 19th-century door.

The church's nave and chancel are under the same roof. The south aisle has a vestry at its east end. Except for the tower, the windows are from the 19th century rebuild in matching Perpendicular style. The north wall has a chancel window and four nave windows with three or two lights. At the east end is the aisle gable with a three-light window and the projecting chancel gable has a three-light traceried window. The south wall has a window to the left of the porch and four to the right, all but one have two lights. The aisle's west gable has a three light window. The porch entrance and its inner doorway from the 19th century rebuild have pointed arches.

=== Interior ===
The chancel's six-bay arcade has granite columns and pointed arches. The roof is arch-braced and wind-braced. Above the doorway is a Norman tympanum decorated with the Lamb of God from an earlier building.

The octagonal granite font is possibly of late-medieval date but was reworked in the rebuilding in the 19th century. The pulpit over a moulded granite base and the pews also date from the 1882 rebuilding.

The church displays a letter from King Charles I from 1643 which has a painted coat of arms on the reverse. Monuments include a Classical marble wall monument to Benjamnin Sampson who died in 1840, coloured glass in east chancel window to John Jose of Mellingey and coloured glass in a south aisle window to geologist William Jory Henwood who died in 1875.

== Churchyard ==
The churchyard wall is constructed of killas rubble, its entrance gate piers, steps and copings are in granite and it has wrought iron railings. They were built in the 19th century and are grade II listed structures. Within the churchyard are several grade II listed headstones and chest tombs. They include a thin slate headstone from 1768 and a nowy-headed headstone from 1821. The graveyard also contains a group of five rectangular chest tombs, two are incised slate slabs on brick bases from 1789 and 1800 and a ground level slate slab is from 1789. An 1808 chest tomb has an incised slate slab on a granite ashlar base and one from 1839 has panelled granite sides and lid with an incised slate insert. An 1845 headstone of white limestone encloses a panelled chest with an obelisk on a triangular pediment. A square chest tomb from 1813 is made of white limestone. It has a plinth with a moulded top, panelled sides and is surmounted by an urn.
