= Santa Coloma =

Santa Coloma may refer to:

- Gaspar de Santa Coloma (1742–1815), Spanish/Argentine businessman
- Santa Coloma d'Andorra, village in Andorra
  - Church of Santa Coloma d'Andorra, in the village
  - FC Santa Coloma, football club in the village
  - UE Santa Coloma, football club in the village
- Santa Coloma, Asturias, village in Asturias, Spain
- Santa Coloma de Gramenet, city in Barcelonès, Catalonia
  - Santa Coloma (Barcelona Metro), a railway station
- Santa Coloma de Queralt, town in Conca de Barberà, Catalonia
- Santa Coloma de Farners, town in Selva, Catalonia
- Santa Coloma, La Rioja, village in La Rioja, Spain
- Santa Coloma de Cervelló, town in Baix Llobregat, Catalonia

== See also ==
- Saint Columba (disambiguation)
- St Columb (disambiguation)
