= St George the Martyr's Church, Truro =

Church in Cornwall, England

St George the Martyr’s Church, Truro
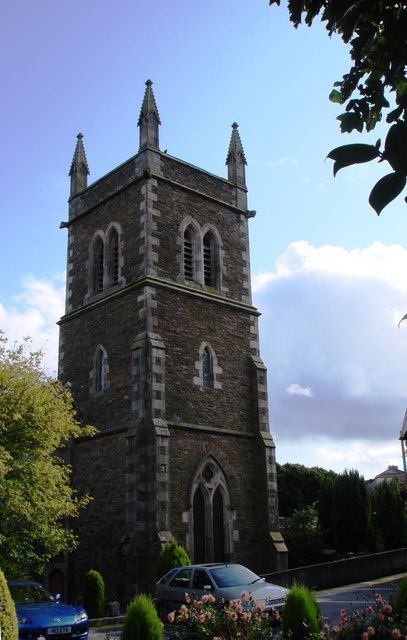
- St George the Martyr’s Church, Truro
- St George the Martyr’s Church, Truro
- 50°15′49.97″N 5°03′30.45″W
- Location: Truro
- Country: England
- Denomination: Church of England
- Churchmanship: Anglo-Catholic

History
- Dedication: St George
- Consecrated: 1855

Architecture
- Heritage designation: Grade II listed

Specifications
- Length: 135 feet (41 m)
- Width: 65 feet (20 m)

Administration
- Province: Province of Canterbury
- Diocese: Diocese of Truro
- Parish: St George Kenwyn

Clergy
- Bishop: The Rt Revd Paul Thomas (AEO)
- Priest: The Reverend Father Dr Owen Edwards

St George the Martyr's Church, Truro is a Grade II listed parish church in the Church of England in Truro, Cornwall.

== History ==
The church was designed by the Rev'd William Haslam. It was consecrated on 5 October 1855 by Henry Phillpotts, Bishop of Exeter

The church was preceded by a temporary church built of wood which was the work of Mr. White, an architect and parishioner; it was opened on 23 April 1848 with a church service well attended by local clergy and lay people.

=== Present day ===
St George's stands in the Anglo-Catholic tradition of the Church of England. As a traditionalist catholic parish that rejects the ordination of women, it receives alternative episcopal oversight from the Bishop of Oswestry (currently Paul Thomas).

== Organ ==
The original organ was rebuilt in 1892 by Brewer and Co of Truro.

The current organ was originally in the Methodist Church in St Columb Major. A specification of the organ can be found on the National Pipe Organ Register.
