= Columbo (disambiguation) =

Columbo may refer to an American detective television program or its titular main character.

Columbo may also refer to:

== People ==
- An alternative spelling of the common Italian surname Colombo
- Russ Columbo, an American singer, violinist and actor
- Franco Columbo, a Mexican professional wrestler.
- Chris Columbo, an American jazz drummer

=== Fictional characters ===
- Mrs. Columbo, the titular character of the American TV series Mrs. Columbo
- Columbo, a character in video games Bust a Groove and Bust a Groove 2

== Other uses ==
- Columbo (herb)
- "Columbo", 2017 song by the Austrian band Wanda
- Old spelling of Colombo, Sri Lanka

== See also ==
- Kolumbo (volcano), a large underwater volcano in the Aegean Sea
- Colombo (disambiguation)
- Columba (disambiguation)
