= Columba (given name) =

Columba is a unisex given name meaning dove which may refer to:

== Religious figures ==
- Columba (521–597), Irish prince who evangelised the Picts, and one of Scotland's patron saints
- Columba of Rieti (1467–1501), Dominican beatified mystic
- Columba of Sens (c. 257 – 273), saint and martyr
- Columba of Spain (died c. 853), nun, saint and martyr
- Columba of Terryglass (died 553), saint and one of the Twelve Apostles of Ireland
- Columba the Virgin, Christian saint who probably lived in the 6th century
- Columba Cary-Elwes (1903–1994), English priest, missionary and author
- Columba de Dunbar (c. 1386 – 1435), Bishop of Moray
- Columba Marmion (1858–1923), beatified Irish monk and third abbot of Maredsous Abbey
- Columba Murphy (fl. 1835), Irish Roman Catholic priest
- Columba Ryan (1916–2009), Dominican priest and philosophy teacher
- Columba Stewart (born 1957), American Benedictine monk and scholar

== Other ==
- Columba Blango (politician) (born 1956), former decathlete and Mayor of Southwark
- Columba Blango (paralympian) (born 1992), British parasports runner
- Columba Bush (born 1953), wife of former Florida Governor Jeb Bush and sister-in-law of President George W. Bush
- Columba Domínguez (born 1929), Mexican retired actress
- Columba Krebs (1902-1998), American esoteric painter
- Columba McDyer (1921–2001), Gaelic football player
- Columba McVeigh (1958–1975), Northern Irish teenager murdered by the IRA
