= Rialton Grange =

Monastic grange in Cornwall, UK

Coordinates: 50.421753°N 5.060749°W

Rialton Grange was a monastic grange in St Columb Minor in Cornwall, UK, belonging to the priors of Bodmin.
