= Treleigh =

Hamlet in Cornwall, England

Coordinates: 50°14′49″N 5°13′26″W

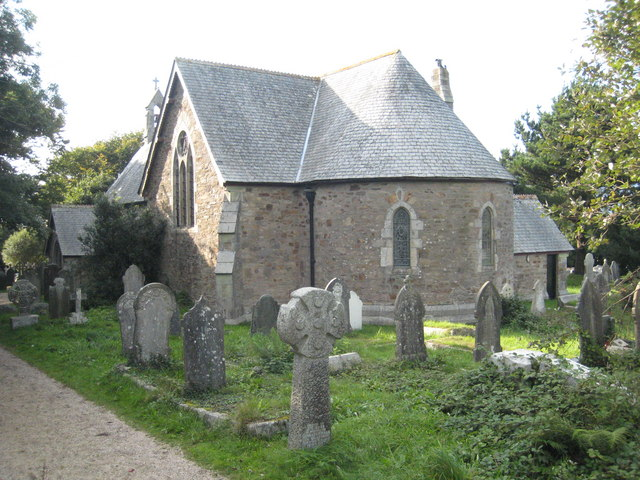
Treleigh parish church

Treleigh (Cornish: Trelegh) is a hamlet north of Redruth in Cornwall, England, United Kingdom.

The ecclesiastical parish of Treleigh was taken out of the parish of Redruth in 1846, and the parish church of St Stephen was built at the same time. The manor house of the manor of Treleigh was on a site much nearer to Redruth.

== Manor of Treleigh ==
In the early 19th century, the manor belonged to Sir William Knighton, who was a physician to George IV. A descendant of Sir Francis Drake, Colonel Drake, owned the manor through marriage to one of Knighton's daughters.
