= Gaspar de Santa Coloma =

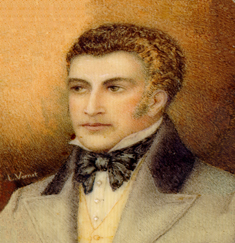
Gaspar de Santa Coloma y Sollano -Miniature on oleum by Luis Vernet

Gaspar de Santa Coloma y Sollano (January 6, 1742 – January 31, 1815) was a Spanish merchant who played a significant role in the economic and cultural development of colonial Argentina.

== Early life ==
Gaspar de Santa Coloma was born in "Casería de la Campa" (today, Campijo), a town in the Álava Region of the Basque Country, Spain. He arrived at the Río de la Plata in 1768, and in 1781 he married Flora de Azcuénaga y Basavilbaso, daughter of Vicente de Azcuénaga and granddaughter of Domingo de Basavilbaso, all of Basque origin.

== Commercial activity and writings ==
Gaspar de Santa Coloma was a prominent merchant in colonial Buenos Aires. His extant correspondence and memoirs offer historians a detailed account of mercantile life in this period, and discuss the British invasions of the Río de la Plata, the role of Martín de Álzaga in those events, and some references to the May Revolution. A description of the work, life, and views of Gaspar de Santa Coloma can be found in “Buenos Aires Colonial” by the Argentine historian Enrique de Gandía, a book based on Gaspar´s memoirs. These records were made available to Gandía by María Antonia Goycoechea Santa Coloma, granddaughter of Francisco de Santa Coloma y Azcuénaga; she was married to Federico Santa Coloma Brandsen (descendant of Coronel Brandsen; see Federico de Brandsen). María Antonia was a descendant of the family branch founded in Argentina by Gaspar de Santa Coloma y Sollano, and Federico Santa Coloma from the branch founded by Tomás de Santa Coloma y Loizaga, both originated in Arceniega. María Antonia later gave these memoirs (14 books) to Enrique Williams Álzaga (Argentine historian, a descendant of Martín de Álzaga), who later donated them to the Argentine National Museum of History.

Gaspar de Santa Coloma was married to Flora de Azcuénaga y Basavilbaso. Although there are no known descendants of these Azcuénaga, their legacy survived in the Presidential Residence (Quinta de Olivos), as well as in the two columns of the “Quinta San Antonio”, at the Vicente López Partido train station, in the Province of Buenos Aires; they survived the passage of time possibly because these two columns were located between the railway and the street, away from development.

The history of the Quinta de Olivos Presidential Residence has been published under the sponsorship of the Vicente López County. Vicente de Azcuénaga and Manuel de Basavilbaso had two farms aside in what today is Vicente López, as can be seen in the map made by José Custodio de Saa y Faria. In June 1794 Miguel de Basavilbaso died, leaving debts and a single daughter, Justa Rufina de Basavilbaso y Garfias, that was then protected by Gaspar de Santa Coloma. Soon, by the influence of Gaspar, Justa Rufina married her cousin Miguel de Azcuénaga, brother of Flora de Azcuénaga and brother-in-law of Gaspar de Santa Coloma. The farm of Manuel de Basavilbaso was inherited by Justa Rufina (it ultimately became the Quinta de Olivos, in 1918). The farm of Vicente de Azcuénaga was inherited by Flora de Azcuénaga and gave origin to the Quinta San Antonio of Vicente López, between the streets Roca and San Martín, today gone, and only survived the two columns already mentioned, that belong to the entrance, and that are located at the end of the train station of Vicente López, in the way towards San Isidro. Apparently, the land belonged originally to Juan José de Vértiz y Salcedo.

From the Azcuénaga nothing was inherited by the last generations of the Santa Coloma's, except an old umbrella. In its ivory grip can be read "M. Azcuénaga de O.F", since it belonged to Manuela Azcuénaga, daughter of Miguel de Azcuénaga, married with her brother cousin, Jose Antonio de Olaguer Feliú y Azcuénaga, son of Ana de Azcuénaga and the Viceroy Olaguer Feliú. Manuela was the only one of four brothers with descendants.

The son of Miguel de Azcuénaga, Miguel José, commissioned the present building of what is today the Presidential Residence in Olivos, Buenos Aires Province, in 1851. This building was the first work of Prilidiano Pueyrredón as an architect (he was better known for his oil paintings). Miguel died old and without children, in Chile, and made a will in favour of his nephews the Olaguer Feliú Azcuénaga. Then, Antonio Justo Olaguer Feliú inherited the Quinta. He did not have descendants, and in 1903 the Quinta was inherited by his nephew, Carlos Villatte Olaguer; Villatte Olaguer ultimately donated it to the National State, with the condition to be a residence for the President of Argentina.

== Tutor of Martín de Álzaga ==
Gaspar de Santa Coloma was the patron and tutor of Martín de Álzaga, the hero of the fight against the English invasions. Álzaga was sent to work and to be educated with Gaspar from a young age. He was 12 years old when he arrived from the Basque country, knowing only a few words of Castilian (as he spoke only the Basque language). There are no references for the reasons by which he was sent to Gaspar, though it was common at that time to send a boy to learn a trade in some office. The merchants usually selected a young man or boy that could be a prospective son-in-law, and instructed them in mercantile practice. Regarding Álzaga, it is only known that his uncle was the captain of the ship that brought him, and probably made the arrangements for Álzaga's apprenticeship with Gaspar. At that time, the economic situation of the Álzaga family in the Basque country was not good, so perhaps Martin Álzaga's apprenticeship to Gaspar was an effort to secure his future financial stability. In fact, the life of these two Basques is full of mysteries, from the intrigue (unspecified by contemporaries) in the Royal Palace of Spain that forced the emigration of Gaspar de Santa Coloma to the Río de la Plata, to Álzaga's idea to restore a monarchy. Gaspar de Santa Coloma wrote in his memoirs, regarding the English invasions and the participation of Álzaga against them: "Ah Cabildo of Buenos Aires! Ah, don Martín de Álzaga, Mayor of First Vote, how much that night it was worked, how everything was arranged so that our enemies did not enter!"

Álzaga remained with Gaspar from the age of 12 until age 22, when he became independent and with Gaspar’s financial help (5000 pesos) established his own commercial enterprise named Álzaga and Requena. According to Gaspar, Álzaga was much more efficient as a merchant. Martín de Álzaga was a key participant in the commerce of the Virreinato, coming to be one of the richest men of that time. Because of his wealth and Spanish origin, Martín de Álzaga was not viewed kindly by the Mayo revolutionaries. He managed to save his life in one first opportunity in 1809, because it had a right trial, where Gaspar of Santa Coloma declared in his favor. Nevertheless, two years later, on July 4, 1812, Álzaga was again detained probably under false accusations and witnesses, and was shot that same day. He was ordered to die without a trial and without a lawyer, by the First Triumvirate (Argentina), formed by Manuel de Sarratea, Feliciano Chiclana and Juan Martín de Pueyrredón, who in that year replaced the former member Juan José Paso. Bernardino Rivadavia was Secretary of war of this Triumvirate, and was actively involved in this sentence to death. Gaspar, on the other hand, could save his life at the cost of his own fortune, which was depleted by continuous withdrawal from the revolutionaries. Also, and most likely, because his brother-in-law was Miguel de Azcuénaga, a member of the Primera Junta with strong influence among the revolutionaries. Since contemporary witnesses, fearing retaliation, left little in writing about Álzaga's death, the details of the incident will likely remain unknown. Álzaga was a perceived as threat to the Triumvirate. For that reason they did not leave any margin for defense or appeal, but rather executed Álzaga immediately. Only Gaspar de Santa Coloma, and his friend José Martinez de Hoz, dared to accompany his rest.

Gaspar educated Álzaga, as well as a prominent journalist and writer Esteban Echeverría, and several nephews, among them Juan Antonio of Santa Coloma. Gaspar was also in charge of all the members of the Azcuénaga family, including Miguel de Azcuénaga, who had been orphaned from a very young age. He did likewise with his family in Spain and helped his neighbors in Arceniega. He donated in his will 60,000 reales to his nephew Vítores Gutiérrez Santa Coloma (about 100 pays of teacher of that time). Vítores lived in Arceniega, in Casería de la Campa (today Campijo), where Gaspar was born. Gaspar had ordered Vítores to repair a church, construct a school and maintain a teacher, Juan Antonio de Palacio. Vítores fulfilled the order of Gaspar so well, that Palacio continued receiving a salary after 1880, that is to say, more than 65 years after the death of Gaspar, during which time his pay increased from 700 reales to 1500 reales. Towards 1880, Palacio apparently lost the memory and nobody in Arceniega or the government of Álava knew from where the legacy came. It is not known either what happened finally with the goods of Gaspar in Arceniega. Another important branch of the Santa Coloma’s in Argentina originated in Vítores Gutiérrez Santa Coloma, that began with its son Juan Domingo Julian Gutiérrez Santa Coloma, nephew grandson of Gaspar of Santa Coloma.

== After the May Revolution ==
After the May Revolution of 1810 (the start of the Argentine War of Independence from Spain) Gaspar lost his power and properties; his fortune was taken by the government. After being one of the most influential, powerful and rich personages of that time, he died on January 31, 1815, leaving little property to his wife Flora and his only son Francisco.

== The lineage of Gaspar de Santa Coloma ==
Gaspar de Santa Coloma and Flora de Azcuénaga had four children, but only Francisco de Santa Coloma y Azcuénaga survived and had descendants. His son Francisco de Asís de Santa Coloma y Azcuénaga was married to Rosa Pascuala de Azcuénaga y Núñez (brother cousin) and had to Francisco de Santa Coloma Azcuénaga (born in San Isidro, 1818), married in Buenos Aires in 1851 to Antonia Armesto y Avellaneda.

== Bibliography ==
- Susan Migden Socolow. The Bureaucrats of Buenos Aires, 1769-1810: amor al real servicio (Durham: Duke University Press, 1987).
- Susan Migden Socolow. The Merchants of Viceregal Buenos Aires: Family and Commerce, 1778-1810 (New York: Cambridge University Press, 1978).) [Awarded the Bolton Prize Honorable Mention, 1979.] A revised Spanish edition has appeared entitled Los mercaderes de Buenos Aires virreinal: familia y comercio (Buenos Aires: Ediciones de la Flor, 1991).
- Susan Migden Socolow. The Countryside in Colonial Latin America (Albuquerque: University of New Mexico Press, 1996). [Co-edited with Louisa Hoberman.] An Expanding World, vol. 9:1, The Atlantic Staple Trade: Commerce and Politics and vol. 9:2, The Atlantic Staple Trade: The Economics of Trade(London: Variorum, 1996).
- Susan Migden Socolow. Cities and Society in Colonial Latin America (Albuquerque: University of New Mexico Press, 1986). [Co-edited with Louisa Hoberman.] The Spanish version is Ciudades y sociedad en Latinoamérica colonial (Buenos Aires: Fondo de Cultura Económica, 1992).
- Susan Migden Socolow. The Countryside in Colonial Latin America (Albuquerque: University of New Mexico Press, 1996) [Co-edited with Louisa Hoberman.]
- Susan Migden Socolow. “The Historiography of Colonial South America,” in José Moya, ed., The Historiography of Latin America (Oxford University Press, 2006).
- Susan Migden Socolow. "Colonial History" in Paula Covington et al., eds. Latin American and Caribbean Studies: A Critical Guide to Research Sources (Westport, Conn.: Greenwood Press, 1992), 321-332 [With Lyman L. Johnson].
- Susan Migden Socolow. "Buenos Aires: Atlantic Port and Hinterland in the Eighteenth Century," in Franklin Knight and Peggy Liss, eds., The American Atlantic World(Knoxville: University of Tennessee Press, 1991), 240-261.
- Susan Migden Socolow. "La burguesía commercial de Buenos Aires en el siglo XVIII" in Enrique Florescano, ed., Origenes y desarrollo de la burgesía en América Latina: 1700-1955 (México: Editorial Nueva Imagen, 1985), 301-316.
- Susan Migden Socolow. "Recent Historiography of the Río de la Plata: Colonial and Early National Periods," Hispanic American Historical Review, 64:1 (February 1984),105-120.
- Susan Migden Socolow. "Buenos Aires at the Time of Independence," in Buenos Aires: 400 Years, eds., Stanley R. Ross and Thomas F. McGann, (Austin: University of Texas Press, 1982), 18-39. A Spanish version of this book entitled Buenos Aires: 400 Años, was published by the Pan American Union.
