= Carn Marth =

Hill in Cornwall, England

Coordinates: 50.224°N 5.205°W

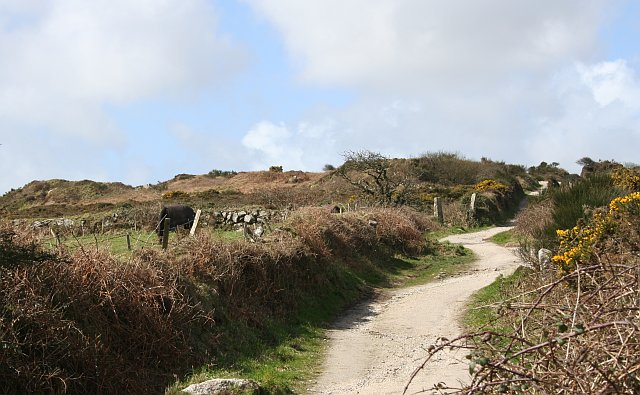

Highest point
- Elevation: 235 m (771 ft)

Naming
- Native name: Karn Margh (Cornish)
- English translation: Horse Tor

Geography
- Location: Cornwall, United Kingdom

Carn Marth (Cornish: Karn Margh, meaning horse tor) is the name of a hill in Cornwall, England, United Kingdom, near Redruth. It is 235 m (771 ft) high, and is well known for the granite quarried from it in the past.

== Geography and history ==
Carn Marth lies 2 kilometres (1.2 mi) southeast of Redruth and is part of the Carnmenellis granite plateau, the 'Carnmenellis Granite', one of several granite plutons in Cornwall that make up part of the Cornubian batholith (see also Geology of Cornwall).

In prehistoric times men settled on the uplands as they had many advantages over the more densely vegetated lowlands. From the late Stone Age they have been natural places of refuge; offering easily defended bases and view points over what was the densely wooded landscape of prehistoric Britain. In early modern times they have been perfect sites to mark victories and celebrations, and to host warning beacons of impending attack such as the feared Spanish invasion of the 1580s.

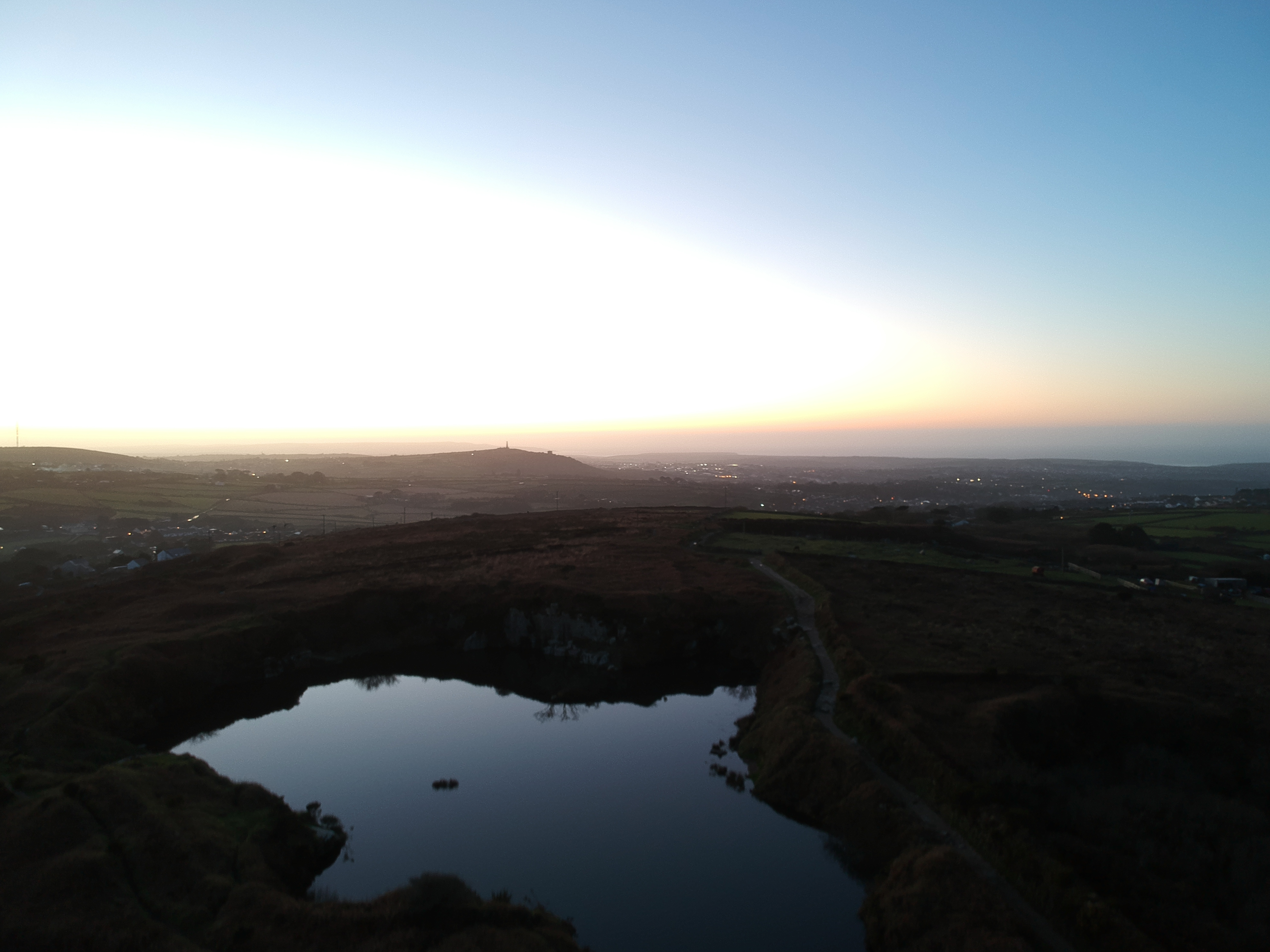
Carn Brea monument and castle, seen clearly from Carn Marth. Below, the flooded quarry.

The hill can be seen from the hills of Bodmin Moor on a clear day, over 45 kilometres (28 mi): the reverse is also true. One can look back, up to the East past St Agnes Beacon to the hills of the Moor, Rough Tor and Brown Willy, the highest hill in Cornwall at 420 metres (1,380 ft), Carn Marth being 185 metres (607 ft) lower at 235 metres (771 ft). The Celtic Sea and Bristol Channel to the north and the English Channel to the south are both visible. With the aid of binoculars one can pick out St Anthony's Light at the entrance to Carrick Roads with Pendennis Castle and Falmouth opposite. Turning further west, reflections of light on the reservoir at Stithians are visible, followed by more hills, Carnmenellis and Carn Brea, with views across the Great Flat Lode and the attendant engine houses.

== Ecology ==
The topmost parts of the Carn are clothed in lowland heath, gorse, bracken and a generous mixture of wild flowers. As one would expect this makes for an equally rich population of insects and in turn, as one moves up the food chain, there are small mammals, reptiles and amphibians and then birds being among the most visible. Cuckoos, warblers, swallows drinking on the wing in the flooded quarries, falcons soaring overhead may be seen. Lower down there are fields for grazing, their limits marked by Cornish hedges. The Carnmarth Trust exists to care for the area.

== Other things by the same name ==
Carnmarth North and Carnmarth South are deaneries of the Diocese of Truro: Carnmarth Deanery was established in 1875, the division into North and South is 20th-century. There is a song called "Carn Marth" on Richard D. James Album, by Cornish electronic musician Aphex Twin.
