= St. Columba's High School =

St Columba's High School may refer to: is a school

- St Columba's High School, Gourock in Inverclyde, Scotland, United Kingdom
- St Columba's Catholic College in Australia
