= St Erney =

- Hamlet
- Interactive map of St Erney
- Coordinates: 50.4122°N 4.2925°W
- Country: United Kingdom
- Region: South West England
- County: Cornwall

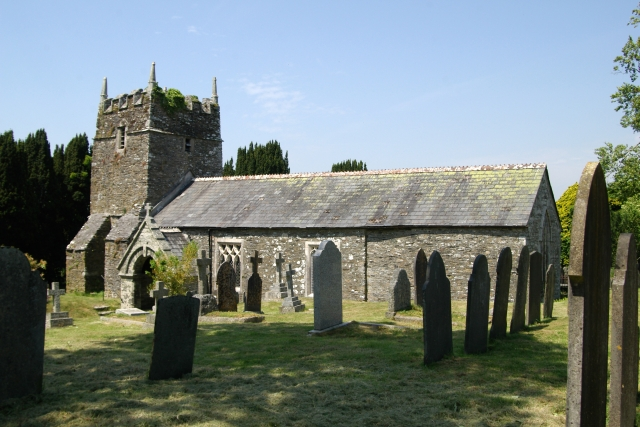
St Erney Church

St Erney is a hamlet with a Church of England church in Cornwall, England, United Kingdom.

== See also ==
- Landrake with St Erney
