= St Ia's Church, St Ives =

Coordinates: 50°12′45.18″N 5°28′47.82″W

St Ives Parish Church, Cornwall
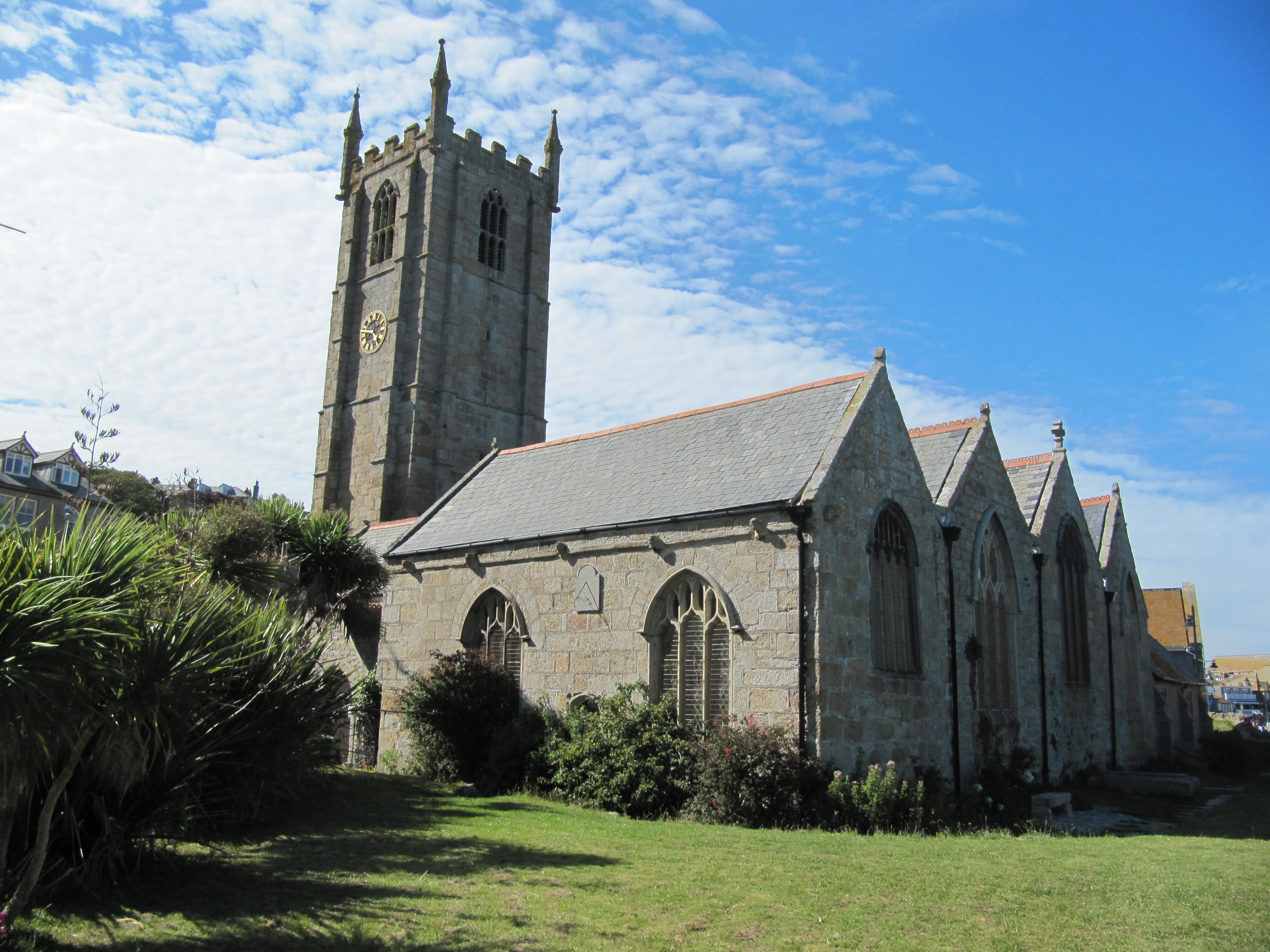
- St Ia's Church, St Ives
- St Ives Parish Church, Cornwall
- Denomination: Church of England
- Churchmanship: Liberal Catholic
- Website: Church website

History
- Dedication: Ia of Cornwall

Administration
- Province: Canterbury
- Diocese: Truro
- Archdeaconry: Cornwall
- Deanery: Penwith
- Parish: St Ives

Clergy
- Vicar: The Revd Andrew Gough
- Location within Cornwall

Listed Building – Grade I
- Official name: Church of St Ia
- Designated: 4 June 1952
- Reference no.: 1143424

St Ia's Church, St Ives, is a parish church in the Church of England in St Ives, Cornwall, UK. It is dedicated to Ia of Cornwall, a 5th- or 6th-century Irish saint, and is a Grade I listed building.

== History and description ==
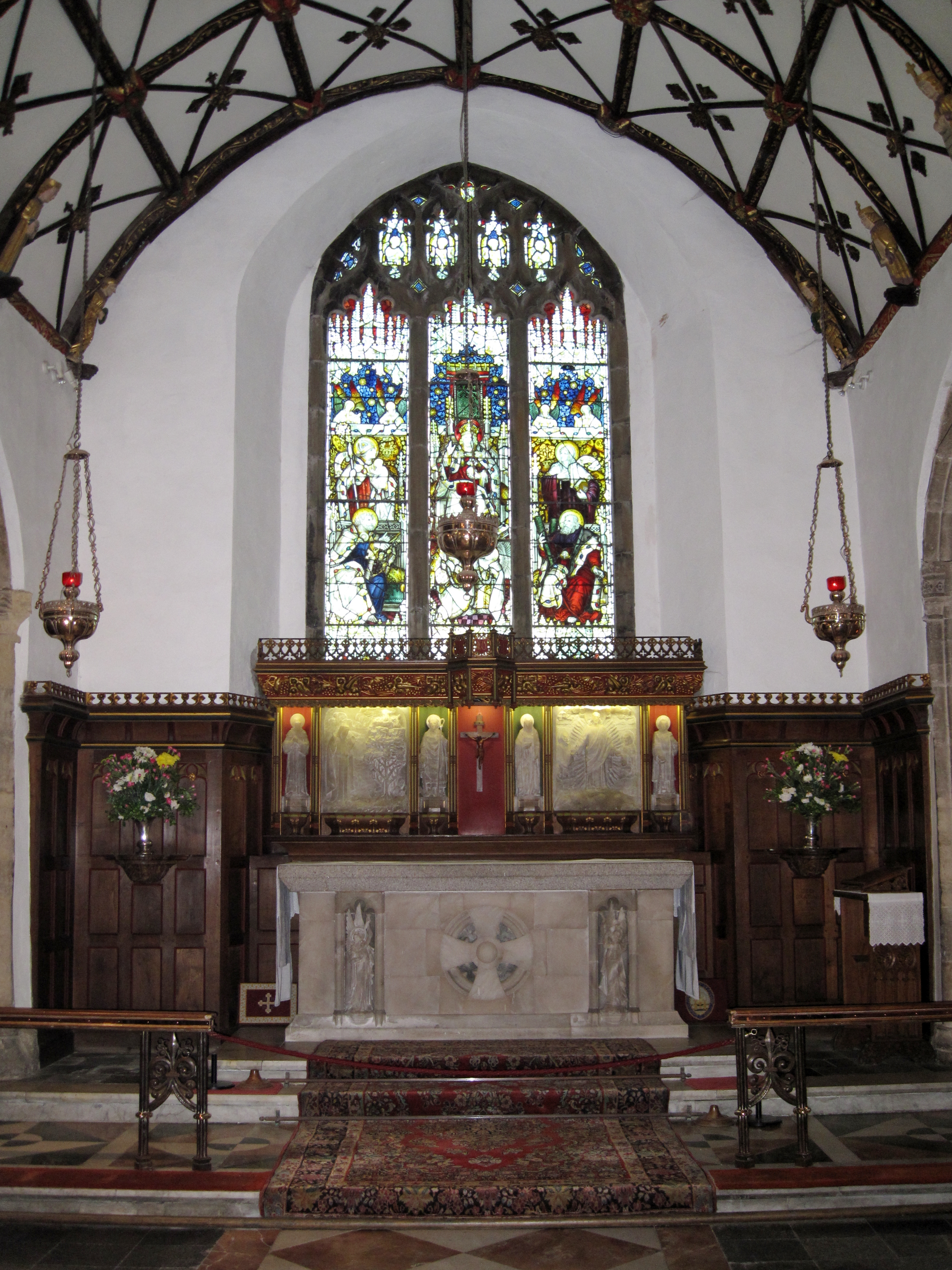
The chancel

The church is dedicated to Ia the Virgin, also known as Ives, an Irish holy woman of the 5th or 6th century. The current building dates to the reign of King Henry V of England. It became a Church of England parish church in 1826. It was built between 1410 and 1434 as a chapel of ease: St Ives being within the parish of Lelant. The tower is of granite and of four stages (over 80 ft high): the church is large but not particularly high and built in a Devonian style rather than a Cornish one. An outer south aisle was added by the Trenwith family about 1500: this is now the Lady Chapel and contains a statue by Barbara Hepworth.

The font is of granite and most likely of the 15th century. It is carved with four angels holding shields. In the chancel, there are bench ends of the standard design and two other, complete benches. There is a brass to a member of the Trenwith family, 1463, and a monument to the Hitchens family by Garland & Fieldwick, 1815.

The church of St. Ives, a beautiful structure of the age of Henry V, with a lofty tower, is dedicated to St. Ia the Virgin; the edifice is well worthy of the observation of those who are curious in ecclesiastical architecture: the living is part of the vicarage of Uny Lelant, but has lately been endowed, by a grant from Queen Anne's bounty, the maintenance of a perpetual curate; the present incumbent of the parish is Rev. Dr. Cardew, the curate is the Rev. C. Aldrich; the patronage of preferment is the diocesan bishop.–Pigot & Co.'s Directory of Cornwall, 1830.

== Organ ==
The church has a pipe organ dating from 1831. It has been restored by Telford and Telford in 1859 and by Hele & Co in 1907, and more recently by Lance Foy in 1993. A specification of the organ can be found on the National Pipe Organ Register.

== Churchyard ==
There is a late medieval lantern cross, ten-and-a-half feet high on an octagonal shaft.
