= St Columba's Church, St Columb Minor =

St Columb Minor Church
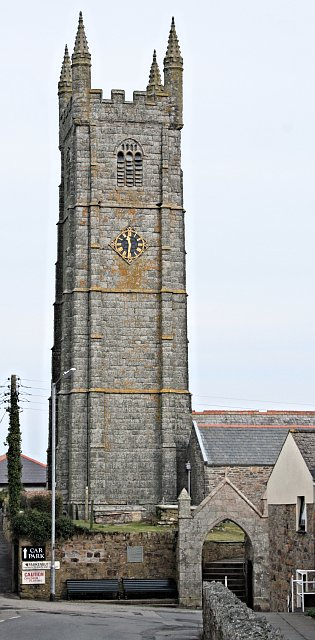
- St Columb Minor Church
- 50°25′18″N 05°02′35″W
- Denomination: Church of England
- Previous denomination: Protestant
- Churchmanship: Anglican
- Website: www.newquaychurches.org.uk/st-columb-minor-church.html

History
- Dedication: Columba of Cornwall

Architecture
- Architectural type: English Gothic
- Style: Gothic, Norman
- Years built: The Church Tower (15th Century)

Specifications
- Materials: Slatestone rubble with granite dressings.

Administration
- Province: Canterbury
- Diocese: Truro
- Archdeaconry: Cornwall
- Deanery: Pydar
- Benefice: St Columb Minor with St Colan
- Parish: Civil: Newquay; Ecclesiastical: St Columb Minor

Clergy
- Vicar: Reverend Chris Harrigan

Listed Building – Grade I
- Official name: Church of St Columba
- Designated: 24 Oct 1951
- Reference no.: 1144140

St Columb Minor Church is a late 15th-century Church of England parish church of the Diocese of Truro in St Columb Minor, Cornwall, United Kingdom

== Site ==
The site is probably that of an ancient barrow where pagan rites were celebrated, and was originally circular. The position is in full view of the twin tumuli, the symbol of the fruitfulness of Mother Nature. It is sheltered from the strong winds of the Atlantic and looks down the Rialton valley and across at Castle-an-Dinas at the summit of Castle Downs. Here the Celtic missionaries, centuries before the Columba legend arose, drove away the evil spirits and replaced pagan magic by Christian worship, and erected the first wooden sanctuary. The Churchtown lay to the West and South while the shelving ground to the North and East prevented building for all time. Hence, as in the case of so many villages, the houses extended more and more from the parish church.

== St Columba ==
Both St Columb Minor & St Columb Major churches were dedicated to Columba of Cornwall, but there is no written record of this. How the name arose or who St. Columba was is not known. The legend is very like that of St. Columba of Sens and some historians think she may be a French saint. The late Mr. Henderson suggested that St. Crantoc called his companions Columba (doves) and that these churches were named after his missionaries.

== The Church Building ==
The initial church likely underwent multiple replacements until around 1100 A.D., when a Norman church was constructed. Its layout has been traced from the current chancel step to about a yard from the belfry door, aligning precisely with the North and South walls, where the present nave arches stand. Remnants of Norman foundations can still be observed around the pillars, allowing us to envision the old church with small windows, possibly featuring transepts and a low arch leading to an apse.

Around the mid-12th century, a new church replaced the Norman one, featuring aisles terminating at the chancel. Little is known about the construction of this church, but it was first mentioned in 1283 as a chapelry to the collegiate church of Crantock. In the same year, Bishop Peter Quinel united the prebends to establish a vicarage. During the Reformation, the Crown grantee was obligated to provide curates for Crantock and St. Columb Minor. However, the stipend for the latter, fixed at £8, proved insufficient due to rising prices.

In 1417, the Bishop of Exeter noted the chancel's dilapidated state, compelling immediate reconstruction using stones that tell a distinctive architectural story. Around 1430, nave arcades were reconstructed, featuring original pillars of Beer stone and others crafted from Cornish granite. An intriguing question arises concerning a blocked Early English window near the tower, divergent from the rest of the structure.

Around 1470, the east walls of both transepts were dismantled, extending the aisles to match the chancel's length, with side walls punctuated by arcades.

The fifteenth century saw the construction of the Tower. Three altars existed, dedicated to St. Columba and the Blessed Virgin Mary, the Holy Trinity, and St. Michael. The 1886 restoration unveiled Beer stone piscinas for these altars.

The screen, a masterpiece of art in 1595, was destroyed in 1795, with fragments visible in the North aisle. The church's seating, built in 1595, featured carved ends, destroyed in 1795, except for one preserved in the North aisle.

The Penventon stone Font, crafted circa 1450, emulates a Norman original. The Porch, with stone benches dating to around 1450, displays a carved 1669 date that was removed during the 1886 restoration.

The Tower, the second highest in Cornwall, stands at 115 feet and was visible across the extensive parish and far out to sea before recent Newquay Road construction.

The Royal Arms, unusually large and finely colored, date to Charles II.

Among the notable slate slabs in the church are memorials to Elizabeth Pollamounter, daughter of Richard Pollamounter, Gent, and Roger Ellery, Commonwealth-era registrar.

During a visit in 1878, the church was described as damp, with green mold on pillars and walls and widespread dry rot. The churchyard was deemed the most poorly maintained the visitor had ever seen.

== Restorations ==
There have been two “restorations.” In 1795 the screen was cut up for floor boards and the nave and aisles filled with deal box pews for the farmers and a gallery put up at the West end for the labourers. The names of subscribers are painted on a board in the belfry. In 1840 the Lay Rector destroyed the ancient East window and inserted the present “churchy” window. Samples of the Victorian glass from this window hang in the North aisle. The Holy Water Stoup was removed about this time and built into the boundary wall to the East of the chancel.

In 1884 the building was in a deplorable state and another restoration was effected. Unfortunately the restorers did not understand this type of church which having been under a monastic body was all on one level. To make a series of steps to the altar the whole floor of the nave was lowered and the floor of the chancel so raised as to bury the bases of the pillars. The church was seated in pitch pine and a new roof put in. The carved rafters of the aisles were taken from the nave roof, and to make the church perfectly straight the chancel walls which inclined to the South were forced out of shape. The organ was formerly in a private house. The church was reopened on 23 September 1886 with a morning sermon by the Bishop of Truro, George Wilkinson.

== Features of the church ==
The pulpit, a splendid piece of work, was given in 1935 by J. Knight, Esq, of Beachcroft in memory of his daughter. The original stone pulpit was given to Trencreek chapel. The chapel was demolished some time ago and the original pulpit has now been lost.

An oak altar table has been given by Mrs Stephens and Dr Stephens in memory of Mr Alexander Stephens who was Churchwarden for many years. Let into the mensa is the Portable Altar, which dates from 1415 and is in perfect condition: there are very few other examples of such an altar.

The clock was given in 1910 in memory of the Reverend A Langford. From the record of the installation of the church clock that it was dedicated by the Vicar on 4 November 1910, and started at exactly three o’clock, when we are told “The sweetness of the chimes was noted by all with delight”. On the face of the clock appear the arms of the Langford family. The appearance of the clock is described as being in accordance with the oldest known examples of such clocks, as seen at Hexham Abbey, and Kirkbampton and Castle Rushen in the Isle of Man.

There is a peal of eight bells.

== See also ==
- St Columba's Church, St Columb Major
