= St Columb Minor =

Coordinates: 50°25′N 5°3′W

St Columb Minor: Cornish: Sen Kolom Woles
- Village
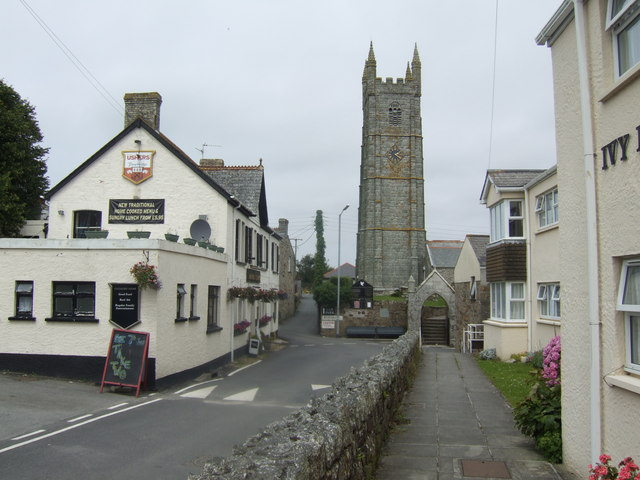
- The pub & church tower from the south

- Location within Cornwall
- OS grid reference: SW838621
- Civil parish: Newquay
- Unitary authority: Cornwall
- Ceremonial county: Cornwall
- Region: South West
- Country: England
- Sovereign state: United Kingdom
- Post town: Newquay
- Postcode district: TR7
- Dialling code: 01637
- Police: Devon and Cornwall
- Fire: Cornwall
- Ambulance: South Western
- Website: St Columb Minor website

St Columb Minor (Cornish: Sen Kolom Woles) is a village in the civil parish of Newquay, on the north coast of Cornwall, England, United Kingdom.

St Columb alone by default refers to the nearby St Columb Major; both the town and the village are named after the 6th century saint Columba of Cornwall and have churches dedicated to her. The village of St Columb Minor dates back to the 11th century, however a settlement existed much earlier under the Manor of Rialton, it has now been absorbed by its larger neighbour Newquay. While the village is still an ecclesiastical parish, St Columb Minor is no longer a civil parish, forming part of Newquay.

== Parish Church ==
The current church dates from the 15th Century.

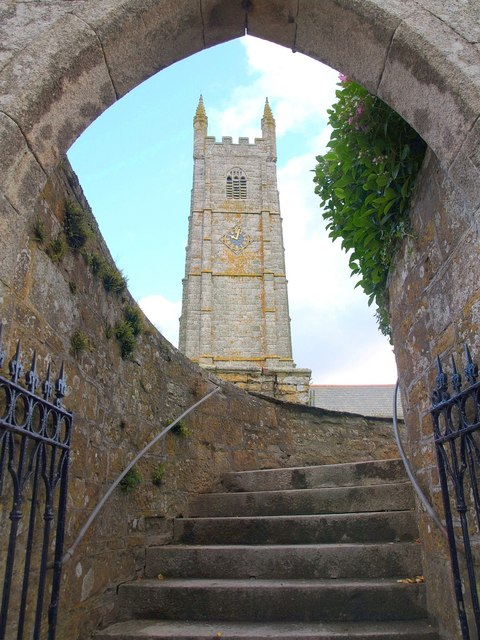
Steps up to churchyard, St Columb Minor

The site of the Parish Church is probably a very ancient pagan site. Here, long before the St Columba legend, came the first Celtic missionaries who exorcised evil spirits and probably erected the first Christian Church which would have been a rough wooden building. The Church was replaced more than once, until in about 1100 A.D. a Norman church was built. Its outline has been traced from the present chancel step to about the position of the font at the West end of the Church, with North and South walls exactly where the nave arches stand today. Part of the original Norman foundations can be seen at the base of the pillars.

In about the middle of the 12th century, another church was erected in place of the Norman one. This had aisles which terminated at the chancel. Nothing is known about the building of this church, except that it was referred to as a chapelry to the College of Crantock in 1283. By 1417, it had been reported that the chancel was in a ruinous state and the whole church needed rebuilding. By about 1430, the Nave arcades were reconstructed.

The present church consists of a chancel, nave, and north and south aisles. The arcades are of six arches each, the chancel arches being obtuse, and the nave arches are pointed. The tower arch is plain; there is a north door, a south porch (within it is the date 1669), and a priest's door. The Tower, which is the second highest in Cornwall, is 115 feet in height and was built in the 15th Century; originally it could have been seen from every point in the parish. It is battlemented and finished with pinnacles.

The church tower is the second highest in Cornwall.

The church has undergone two major restorations: once in 1795 and again in 1884.

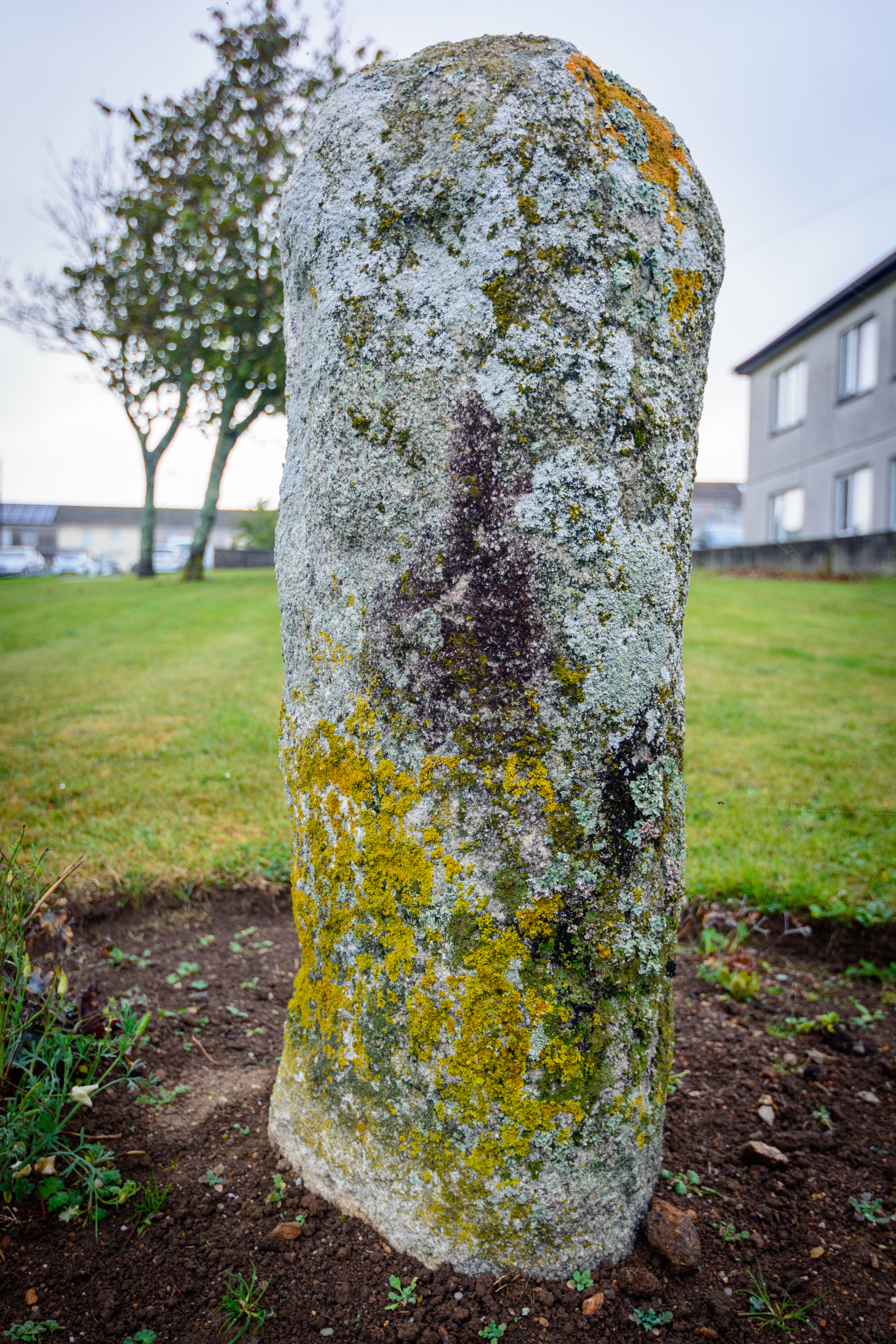
Double Stiles Cross

== History ==
The Village was first mentioned in 1283 when it was referred to as a chapelry to the collegiate church of Crantock; it was mentioned officially in 1284 as 'Sancta Columba Minor.'

In Celtic and Anglo-Saxon times Rialton (in which the village fell under) was the head manor of the Hundred of Pydar and belonged to the monks of St Petroc at Bodmin. The monastery remained in possession after the Norman Conquest and a manor house was built here by Prior Vivian (Thomas Vivian, titular Bishop of Megara) c. 1510. The manor passed to the Duchy of Cornwall in 1538 but some of the manor house remains.

St Columb Minor was a large growing village when Newquay (Towan) was just a small fishing village with a cluster of cottages and farmland. The population of St Columb Minor in 1841 was 1,681 and only 489 of the people lived in Newquay.

The western end of the church and yard is in view of the Trevelgue clifftop twin tumuli, known locally as The Barrows. It is sheltered from the strong winds of the Atlantic and looks down the Rialton Valley and across to Castle-an-Dinas on the summit of Castle Downs. Local legend has it that the Celtic missionaries, centuries before the Columba legend arose, drove away the evil spirits and replaced pagan magic by Christian worship, and erected a wooden sanctuary. The church-town lay to the west and south while the shelving ground to the north and east prevented building. Hence, as in the case of so many villages, development in the 20th century extended further from the parish church, in this case towards Porth Bean and Henver Roads, leading into Newquay.

The oldest Cottages in the village are on Church Street. Honey-suckle Cottage was a farmhouse in the early 17th century and the ships timbers from Porth were used in its construction.

As of 1896, there were a Cornish cross and four cross bases in the parish: the cross is at Cross Close and is unusual in being almost circular in section. The housing estate that was constructed in the 1950s now surround the cross. The Doublestiles Cross marks the ancient path to the village. Henver Road meaning 'the old road' that the cross was nearby is the main road into Newquay for a few hundred years.

In 1891 the civil parish had a population of 3,056. In 1894 the parish was abolished and split to form Newquay and St Columb Minor Rural.

In 1960, the parish of St Columb was subsumed by Newquay of which St Columb Minor is now a suburb. Villages in this parish were: Trencreek, Chapel, Porth, Trenance and the Churchtown.

=== St Columb Porth ===
Porth Beach was originally the port for the village of St. Columb Minor, the long sheltered bay is a drowned river mouth and in the 19th century the tide reached Rialton almost two miles (3 km) inland. All the requirements of the village such as coal, salt, lime and a multitude of general cargoes were unloaded here. Grain and later china clay and stone were taken away from the port. When Newquay became a china clay port vessels discharged coal into carts on the beach at Porth and continued to Newquay to load china clay.

=== The Farmers Arms ===
The public house, the Farmers Arms, was originally built of cobb with a thatched roof. The Landlord was Mr Samuel Argall who had owned the Inn since 1871. In October 1913, the roof caught fire the cause of which was a lighted match being thrown into the roof by a young boy. Two fire brigades arrived, one from Newquay, who arrived first wearing brand new uniforms and one brigade from St Columb Major, both brigades worked together but the fire had destroyed the inn. Once the fire was out a 'water fight' between the two fire brigades began. The fight was over the use of the single hydrant which stood near the inn. The hydrant had two hose connectors and the Newquay brigade, who had arrived on the scene forty minutes before St Columb Major had attached their hoses to both connectors. St Columb Major fire brigade, who considered themselves the superior force, were extremely angry that they had to use water from the local pond to help put the fire out turned their hoses on the 'rival' brigade.

The Inn was rebuilt in 1914.

== Double Stiles Stone Cross ==
The Double stiles Cross also known as Three Stiles Cross, is a good example of the rare slab form of cross whose thick, rounded section is a rare feature of that cross type. Wayside crosses are one of several types of Christian cross erected during the medieval period, mostly from the 9th to 15th centuries AD. They were to mark unfamiliar terrain. The Stone is located at the junction of Duchy Road with the main route linking Newquay with the east, the modern A392 road. The cross is only one metre from its original location where, before the urban expansion of Newquay, it was situated on the edge of a field called `Cross Close', by the junction of the main route with a parish footpath leading to the church at St Columb Minor.

In the medieval period, the church at St Columb Minor was a chapelry of a collegiate church at Crantock, south west of Newquay. This path was of importance at that time as the direct link between these two dependent medieval religious establishments. The line of the path north east from the cross survives in a modified form as a public footpath. A second wayside cross is also located 520m to the south west along the former line of the same path. The modern parish of Newquay, within which Doublestiles Cross and its church path are situated, was only created in 1918; this medieval monument preserves the route relating to the former parish of St Columb Minor and the earlier route to the church at Crantock.

== Education ==
=== Former ===
The National School in the Square was built in 1842. It is on the site of the Parsonage and is now used as a Men's Institute.

St Columb Minor Fairpark Boarding School (later known as the red school) was originally designed by Silvanus Trevail and formally opened in June 1877. The School eventually closed in 1982 and today it has been converted into light industrial units.

=== Current ===
St Columb Minor is served, at primary level, by St Columb Minor Academy since 1959 – part of Kernow Learning Multi-Academy Trust.

Treviglas Academy (Treviglas College) is a secondary school serving Newquay, St Columb Minor and the surrounding area since 1960. The school part of The Roseland Multi Academy Trust.

== Notable people ==
- Ralph Allen (ca. 1693–1764), postmaster, merchant and philanthropist; reformed Britain's postal system.
- William Golding (1911–1993), novelist, wrote Lord of the Flies, born in the parish (which at the time included Newquay, his actual birthplace).
- James Morrison (born 1984), British singer, lived at Porth Newquay and attended Treviglas school

== See also ==
- St. Columb Road
