= Columba of Cornwall =

6th-century Breton–Cornish saint

Saint Columba of Cornwall
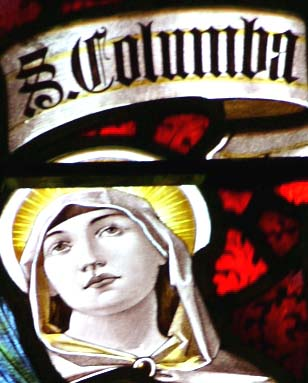
- From a stained glass window at St Columba's Major Church

Virgin & Martyr
- Born: unknown Lothian, Scotland probably
- Died: 6th century Ruthvoes, Cornwall
- Venerated in: Roman Catholicism; Anglican Communion; Eastern Orthodox Church
- Major shrine: St Columba's Church, St Columb Major
- Feast: 11 November/15 November
- Attributes: Female carrying a palm branch and a sword, a dove hovering above

Columba of Cornwall, was a 6th-century Cornish saint. According to tradition, she was born to pagan royalty but converted to Christianity and was later martyred after refusing an arranged marriage. She is associated with St Columb Major and St Columb Minor, where she is venerated as a local patron saint. Her feast day is variously given in November.

== Life ==
Columba was born in the 6th century, to pagan royals King Lodan and Queen Manigild, probably in Lothian, Scotland. According to hagiographer David Nash Ford, her parents' name may be corrupt forms of names of King Lot and Queen Morgause in the Arthurian legends. She might have had nine sisters, one of whom was named Wendon (or Wedern). Most of what is known of Columba is due to two parishes in Cornwall that name her as their patron saint and a manuscript in the collection of the University Library of Cambridge, written by Cornish Roman Catholic activist and scholar Nicholas Roscarrock during the reign of Elizabeth I and based on local tradition.

Columba became a Christian when the Holy Spirit appeared to her in a vision, in the form of a dove, promising her love and blessings. Her parents arranged a marriage for her to a pagan prince, even though she had taken a vow of virginity and had refused to attend the pagan temple with them; she rejected the marriage, and her parents, who "dissuaded her first with kindness, then with cruelty", imprisoned her. An angel helped her escape and led her into the desert, where she was captured again by a local king, who admired her beauty and grace, and offered to marry her to his son if she renounced her faith. She refused, so she was tortured on the breaking wheel and gallows, but she did not die, and was again imprisoned. An angel again helped her escape, and she fled to the coast and boarded a ship that took her to Cornwall at what is now Trevelgue Head (which is translated to English as "red dirt"; Cornish historian Nicholas Orme speculates that this refers to the color of the soil at the site of the martyrdom and the manner in which it took place). The king found her at Ruthvoes in central Cornwall, three km south of St Columb Major and 10.5km east of Newquay, and beheaded her. She was buried at St Columb Major.

== Legacy and veneration ==
Hagiographer and historian Sabine Baring-Gold has suggested that Columba might have been a man, but there is no evidence of it and it is commonly accepted that she was a woman. She is the patron of the churches of St Columba Major and St Columba Minor in Cornwall, documented in c.1240 and 1284 respectively. St Columba Church Major was one of the wealthiest churches in Cornwall, so it was staffed by parish priests and seven chantry priests during the 15th and early 16th centuries, which may explain why there are well-developed traditions surrounding Columba. They were written down in Cornish by the late 16th century by a physician who worked in St Columb Minor or a nearby town and were addressed to Roscarrock. In 1607, Roscarrock described the text as a poem to his friend, historian William Camden. Local tradition states that at the site of Columba's execution, "a spring gushed forth along the path of her fallen blood", and was marked in Roscarrock's day by a well; as of 2000 traces of the well and a cemetery remained there. Roscarrock reports the legend that the water from the well would not boil.

Orme states the feast day of Columba has "a complex history". There are differences in the date it was celebrated; at St Columba Major, the dates cited are the Thursday after 1 November, the nearest Sunday to 17 November and the Sunday after the second Thursday before 13 November. At St Columb Major, her feast day was held on about 15 November, "depending upon the full moon". Her feast day was then moveable, like at other Cornish parishes, but at some point apparently changed from Thursday to Sunday at St Columb Major. Fairs were held at St Columb Major on 25 April and on 24 June.

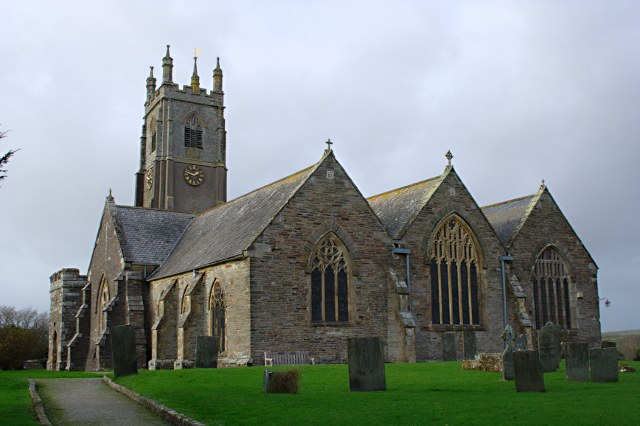
St Columb Major Church

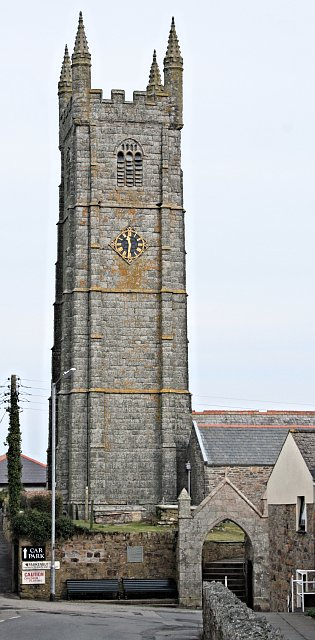
St Columb Minor Church tower

== Works cited ==
- Hutchison-Hall, John (Ellsworth) (2017). Orthodox Saints of the British Isles, Vol. 4. St. Eadfrith Press. pp. 145–146. ISBN 1542718228.
- Orme, Nicholas (2000). The Saints of Cornwall. Oxford: Oxford University Press. pp. 91–93. ISBN 1-280-44546-7. OCLC 252553265
