= Tangye =

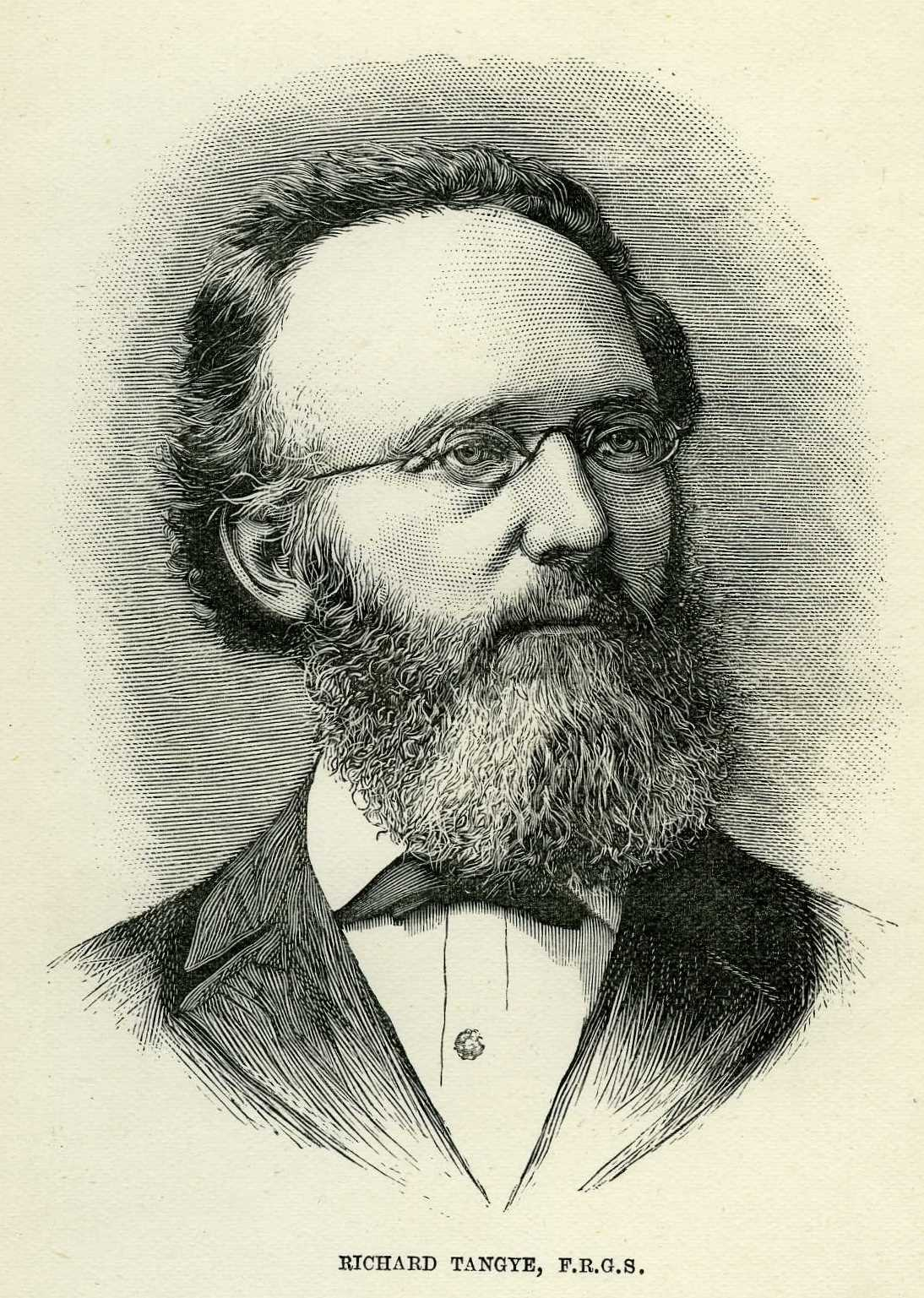
- Richard Tangye

Origin
- Origin: Fire dog

Tangye is a surname of Breton origin and is common in Cornwall. It may refer to:

- Richard Tangye, industrialist (1833–1906)
  - His son, Sir Harold Lincoln Tangye, 1st Baronet (1866–1935)
    - His son, Sir Basil Richard Gilzean Tangye, 2nd Baronet (1895–1969)
  - His son, Lt. Colonel Richard Trevithick Gilbertstone Tangye O.B.E., JP
    - His son Derek Tangye
      - Derek's wife Jean Tangye
    - His son Nigel Tangye
  - His niece, Helena Tangye Lean
    - Her son Edward Tangye Lean
    - Her son David Tangye Lean, a.k.a. David Lean
- George Tangye, Richard's brother

== See also ==
- Tangye baronets
- Tanguy
