= Tangye baronets =

Extinct baronetcy in the Baronetage of the United Kingdom

Escutcheon of the Tangye baronets of Glendorgal

The Tangye baronetcy, of Glendorgal in the parish of St Columb Minor in the County of Cornwall, was a title in the Baronetage of the United Kingdom. It was created on 10 July 1912 for the industrialist Harold Tangye. He was the eldest son of the manufacturer Sir Richard Tangye.

The title became extinct on the death of the 2nd Baronet in 1969.

== Tangye baronets, of Glendorgal (1912) ==
- Sir Harold Lincoln Tangye, 1st Baronet (1866–1935)
- Sir Basil Richard Gilzean Tangye, 2nd Baronet (1895–1969)

== Extended family ==
Nigel and Derek Tangye were nephews of the 1st Baronet, respectively the first and third sons of his brother Richard Trevithick Gilbertstone Tangye (1875–1944).

== See also ==
- Tangye

Baronetage of the United Kingdom
Preceded by Smith baronets	Tangye baronets of Glendorgal; 10 July 1912	Succeeded by Watson baronets
