= Glendorgal Hotel =

Hotel in Newquay, Cornwall, England

- Former names: Glendorgal House
- Alternative names: The Glendorgal

General information
- Location: United Kingdom, Glendorgal Hotel Lusty Glaze Rd, Newquay TR7 3AD, Newquay
- Completed: 1850 (As private house)
- Opened: 1950 (As a Hotel)

Technical details
- Floor count: 2

Other information
- Number of rooms: 26

Website
- https://www.glendorgal.co.uk/

The Glendorgal Hotel is in Newquay, Cornwall overlooking Porth Beach.

== History ==
The Glendorgal Hotel started as a seaside retreat in a cottage orné style, built by Francis Rodd IV of Trebartha in 1850. It was sold to Arthur Pendarves Vivian who later bought a large swathe of Porth Beach and Trevelgue Head to go with the house. Following a dispute with the architect Silvanus Trevail, who was planning a large new housing estate at Porth. Vivian sold the house to the sitting tenant Sir Richard Trevithick Tangye in 1882, and it became the seat of the Tangye Baronetcy in 1912. They changed its setting, making its grounds an 'integral' and 'picturesque' part of the wider setting of the house. After 1950 the house was converted into a seasonal hotel and restaurant.

The original building was surrounded and partly over-built with later 20th century additions and its internal spaces reordered.

In 1911 Glendorgal was visited by two royal Princes; Edward (Edward VIII) and Albert (George VI). In 1918 the First World War came very close to the Glendorgal and tea parties were held on the veranda for injured soldiers.

In 1950 Sir Richard Tangye's grandson, Nigel Tangye came into sole possession of the property and, with his wife Lady Marguerite Tangye, opened it as a summer season hotel and restaurant in 1950.
