= Newquay Bay =

Bay in Cornwall, England

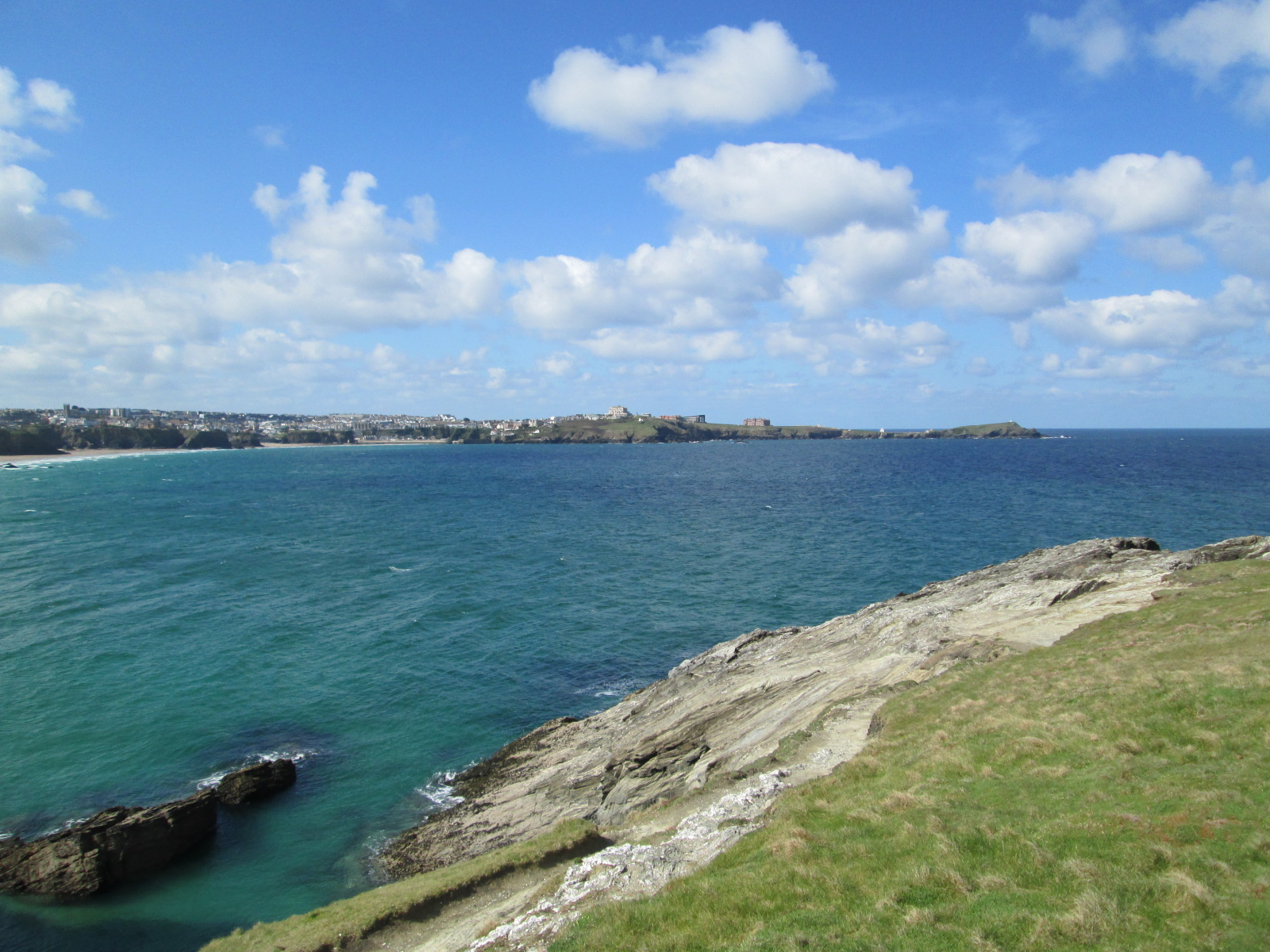
- Looking towards Towan Head from Trevelgue Head

- Location within Cornwall
- Location: Cornwall, SW815625
- Coordinates: 50°25′20″N 5°4′36″W
- Max. width: 2.5 kilometres (1.6 mi)

Newquay Bay is a bay adjacent to Newquay in Cornwall, England.

The bay is about 2.5 kilometres (1.6 mi) wide, from Towan Head in the west to Trevelgue Head in the east, beyond which is Watergate Bay. Newquay Bay includes Lusty Glaze beach and Porth beach.
