= Porth, Cornwall =

Coordinates: 50.4228°N 5.0563°W

Porth: Cornish: Porth; Newquay
- Suburb
- Civil parish: Newquay
- Unitary authority: Cornwall
- Ceremonial county: Cornwall
- Region: South West
- Country: England
- Sovereign state: United Kingdom
- Post town: Newquay
- Postcode district: TR7
- Dialling code: 01637
- Police: Devon and Cornwall
- Fire: Cornwall
- Ambulance: South Western
- Website: https://www.newquay.gov.uk/

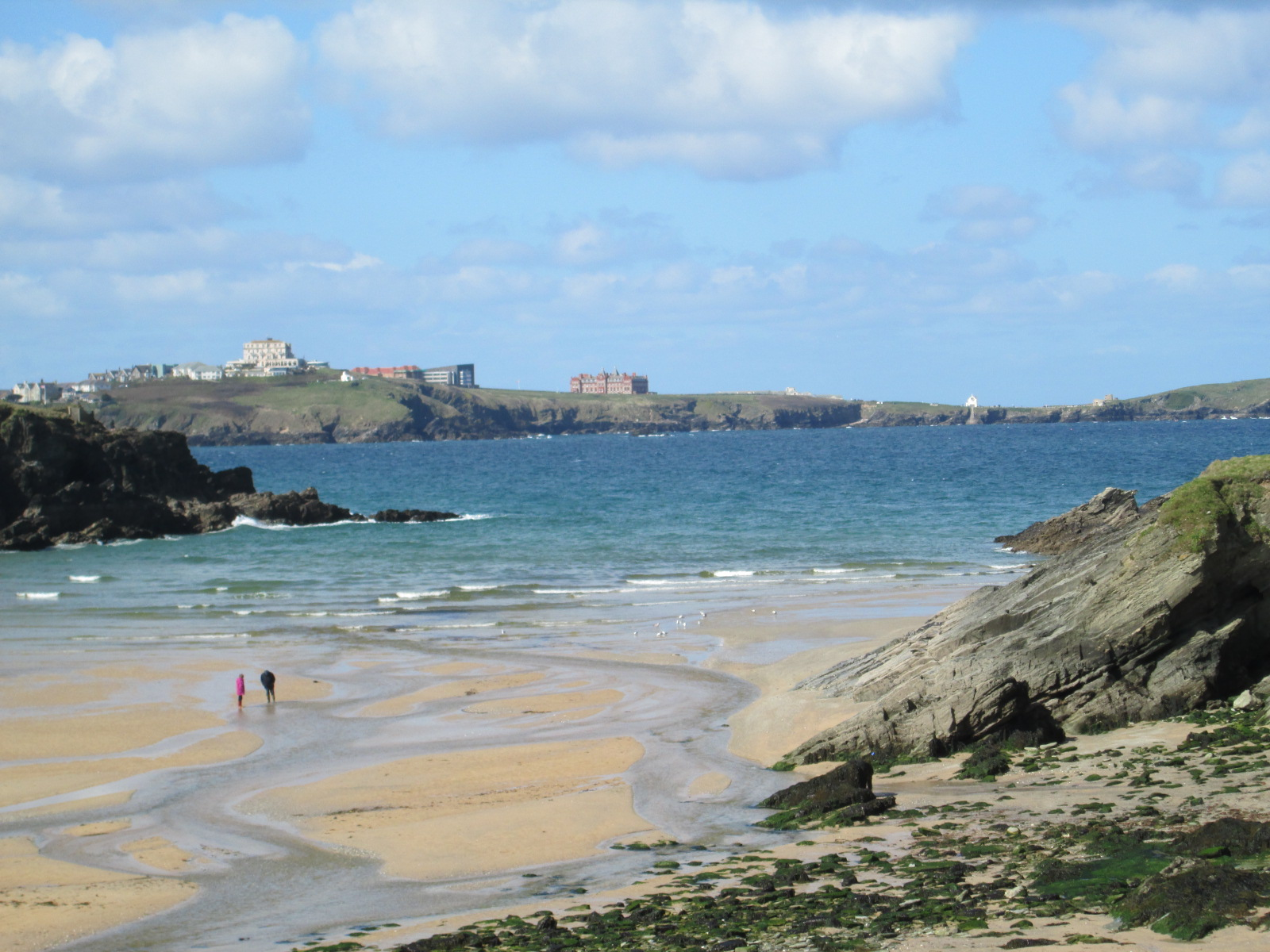
Porth Beach

Porth is a small historic coastal settlement and beach area located on the eastern edge of Newquay, Cornwall, England.

Porth is near the village of St Columb Minor. It was known as St. Columb Porth. The village is to the east of a 1 kilometre (0.62 mi) sandy inlet with the Iron Age promontory fort of Trevelgue Head, on the northern side.

== History ==
Porth’s full name is St Columb Porth, meaning "the port of St Columb." Historically, it was part of the civil parish of St Columb Minor, though it is now incorporated into the civil parish of Newquay. Despite this change, the ecclesiastical parish of St Columb Minor still exists.

Before the development of Newquay, St Columb Porth was a small port and agricultural settlement. Its long, sheltered bay is a classic example of a drowned river mouth. In the 19th century, the tide extended nearly two miles (3 km) inland to Rialton, making Porth the primary port for the nearby village of St Columb Minor. Essential supplies such as coal, salt, lime, and general cargo were unloaded here, while exports included grain, and later, china clay and stone.

As Newquay grew into a major china clay port, vessels would first offload coal onto carts on Porth beach before continuing to Newquay to collect clay. Several historic buildings in Porth reflect this era. Cavern Cottage, on Alexandra Road, built with stone rubble in the mid-19th century, is now a listed building. The oldest surviving cottage is Gwenna, dating back to the early 17th century, with cob walls made from clay, stones, and straw. The historic Morvah farmhouse, built around 1660, still stands, accompanied by former stables—now cottages—and Concord Cottage, which once stored salt and the fishing nets of the Concord Pilchard Seine Fishing Company. Behind Concord Cottage lie the ruins of a fish cellar, built in 1804 and closed in 1846. Fishing vessels were traditionally constructed along the sea wall behind this cellar.

Until 1902, before Alexandra Road bridge was built, all traffic crossed the beach and forded the river to reach Watergate Road.

The Porth Valley itself has a long history of intensive use. Slate was quarried from its sides, and in the 1830s, tin was extracted from the valley gravels. Morganna Mine, active in the mid-19th century, left adits still visible near the steps to Whipsiderry Beach. The valley’s clays were also used to make bricks, many of which were used in the construction of the Atlantic Hotel in 1892. Near the bottom of Watergate Road, the first inlet on the Headland was once home to a shipyard. Two schooners were built there in 1857–58, followed by two smacks and another schooner between 1875 and 1880.

== Glendorgal ==
On the southern side is the Glendorgal Hotel, built in 1850 as a gentleman's residence. In 1878 it was the residence of Arthur Pendarves Vivian, the member of parliament for the constituency of West Cornwall, who carried out extensive alterations in that year. In 1882 it was bought by Sir Richard Trevithick Tangye, a Cornishman born in Illogan who became a mechanical engineer, and along with his brothers started an engineering firm in Birmingham. The house became the residence of the Tangye Baronetcy created on 10 July 1912 for the industrialist Harold Tangye, the son of Sir Richard. Three generations of the Tangye family lived in Glendorgal including Sir Richard's grandson Derek Tangye; the author of the Minack Chronicles, nineteen novels based on a smallholding near Lamorna Cove in West Cornwall. In 1950 the house was opened as a hotel by Nigel Tangye, brother of Derek.

== Porth Veor Manor ==
Porth Veor Manor Hotel was originally designed by Cornish architect Silvanus Trevail and was built in 1879. Porth Veor was first owned by Mr. William Stephens.

It is located overlooking the Porth beach, it eventually became Porth Veor Manor hotel was owned and run in the 1920s by author Charlotte Mary Matheson and her husband Stanley Threlkeld. A prominent woman farmer, Charlotte wrote several novels including The Generation Between, still available in print.

== Notable residents ==
(Past or present) have included:

- Charlotte Mary Matheson, English novelist (1892 to 1937)
- James Morrison (singer)
- Sir Basil Richard Gilzean Tangye, 2nd Baronet (1912–1969)
- Derek Tangye, author, grandson of Sir Richard
- Nigel Tangye, brother of Derek Tangye and husband of actress Ann Todd
- Sir Richard Tangye, engineer

== See also ==
- Newquay
- St Columb Major
- St Columb Minor
