= John Edyvean =

British engineer

John Edyvean was a British engineer from Cornwall who developed an inclined plane system, to reduce the necessity for locks on the English canal network.

== Canal ==
In 1773, during the reign of George III, a plan was approved in principle by the House of Commons of Great Britain to create a canal from Mawgan Porth, through various parishes including St Mawgan, St. Columb Major, Little Colan, and St. Columb Minor, to Porth. Edyvean gave evidence and was described as John Edyvean of St Austell, Gentleman. The scheme, called the St Columb Canal or Edyvean’s Canal, was designed to be 13 miles long, running in a loop inland from Mawgan Porth and then back to Newquay, with the purpose of moving sand, seaweed, and stone to farms inland. It would follow a contour line and thus need no canal locks. Work is said to have begun in 1773, but only the section between Mawgan Porth and St Columb was ever finished.

However, Edyvean died before the project was completed at a cost of £100,000. An attempt to revive the scheme was made in 1829 by a Mr Retallick of Liskeard, but this amounted to nothing.

Edyvean also proposed the Bude Canal.

== Death ==
Edyvean died in the 1780s. A reminiscence of him published in September 1791 and signed anonymously by "B—" related:

"In the year 1779 he had finished the canal up to the town of St. Columb, about six miles from the sea. It approached the sea no nearer than to the summit of an immense cliff, down which he had constructed an inclined plane... in that year I went with some friends to visit this work. We overtook this poor old man groping his way up the inside of his canal, and leading a miserable little horse in his hand. We joined him and he conducted us to all the parts of his ingeneous work with the intelligence of one who had formed the whole, inch by inch, and this alone can account for the ease and safety with which in his blind state he passed through every part of it. We dined together and he gave us a little history of his life".

== See also ==
- Bude Canal.
- St. Columb Canal
- Canal inclined plane
