= St Columb Canal =

Canal in Cornwall, England

Coordinates: 50°28′N 5°02′W

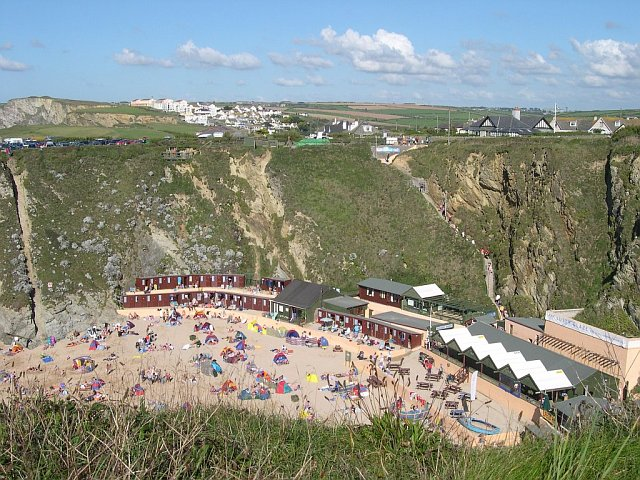
- Lusty Glaze Beach, with the inclined plane on the extreme left
- Interactive map of St Columb Canal

Specifications
- Locks: 2 inclined planes
- Status: parts traceable

History
- Date of act: 1773
- Date of first use: 1779
- Date closed: 1781

Geography
- Start point: Mawgan Porth
- End point: Lusty Glaze

St Columb Canal sometimes referred to as Edyvean's Canal, was an abortive canal scheme in Cornwall, England, designed for the carriage of sea sand for use as manure. It was authorised in 1773, and part of it may have been briefly used around 1780.

== History ==
St. Columb Canal Act 1773
- Act of Parliament
- Parliament of Great Britain
- Long title: An Act for making and continuing a navigable Cut or Canal from Maugan Porth, through the several Parishes of Maugan, Saint Colomb Major, Little Colan, and Saint Colomb Minor, to Lower Saint Colomb Porth, in the County of Cornwall.
- Citation: 13 Geo. 3. c. 93
- Territorial extent: Great Britain

Dates
- Royal assent: 1 April 1773
- Commencement: 26 November 1772 (Note: Start of session.)

Status: Current legislation

Text of statute as originally enacted

The canal was first proposed by the Cornish engineer, John Edyvean in 1773. His idea was to run a canal from Mawgan Porth through parishes inland and to return to Newquay. Its purpose was to import sea-sand, seaweed and stone for manuring to improve land. Edyvean obtained an act of Parliament, the St. Columb Canal Act 1773 (13 Geo. 3. c. 93) on 1 April 1773, which authorised a 30-mile (48 km) canal, although it appears that the clerk must have misheard what was said, as the plans were for a 13-mile (21 km) canal. The engineer John Harris gave evidence to a parliamentary committee to secure the act for the canal, the cost of which was estimated to be between £5,000 and £6,000. Edyvean planned to finance the costs himself.

Work started in 1773, and two sections were built, each with an inclined plane to connect it to the foreshore, but the canal was never completed. It appears that the southern section, from Lusty Glaze to Rialton Barton near St Columb Minor, which followed the 100-foot (30 m) contour and was 2 miles (3.2 km) long, was started first, but may never have been used, as there were problems with the canal holding water due to sandy soil. The northern section, from Trenance Point at Mawgan Porth, which followed the 200-foot (61 m) contour, terminated a little short of Whitewater, where it was fed by the River Menalhyl. Edyvean advertised for 50 able-bodied men in 1776, who would be paid 14 pence (6p) per day to dig the canal. This section was some 4.5 miles (7.2 km) long and was used for two or three years. Edyvean appears to have spent most of his own fortune on the project, and his sister's money as well. Realising that he was unlikely to recoup much of it, the project was abandoned, and he died in the 1780s.

An account of the operation of one of the inclined planes was published in A. Rees's Cyclopaedia in 1805. It described a steep inclined plane covered in planks. The square tub-boats were brought to the end of the canal, where the front end of the boat was attached to a hinge, and the back end was attached to ropes. The ropes passed onto a wheel and drum, which was operated by a horse-gin. As the boat tipped up, the cargo of stones rolled down the planks to the beach below. The wheel and drum were also used to draw boxes containing coal or sand up from the beach, to be loaded into the boats.

In 1829, Richard Retallick, a businessman from Liskeard, revived the idea of a canal from St Columb to Mawgan Porth, which was part of a larger project to make the Porth suitable for use as a harbour during the summer months. He issued a prospectus, but no further progress was made.

== Route ==
The canal was built as a 'tub-boat' canal which used inclined planes instead of locks to change levels. The northern section began at Trenance Point, on the cliffs to the north of Mawgan Porth, and followed the course of the Menalhyl Valley towards the east. Because it was at a higher level than the river, it had to pass a number of side streams, which was achieved by building large loops away from the river, in order to maintain the level of the canal. Most of the route is clearly visible on the 1888 Ordnance Survey map, and several sections are still visible on modern maps. The first loop was towards Trenance, now covered by housing in Mawgan Porth, but the 200-foot (60 m) contour shows its approximate route. To the east of Mawgan Porth was another loop, around a series of springs and a stream, which is still visible near Merlin Farm, the historical location of Moreland. To the north of Retorrick Mill, a track follows the course for some distance, after which there was another loop to accommodate the stream that flows south to join the Menalhyl upstream of the mill. After crossing the road from Little Lanherne to Lower Lanherne, the tracks around New Farm and Higher Lanvean, to the north of the Lanvean Bottoms Nature Reserve again follow the route of the canal.

The route continued to the east, passing just to the south of the buildings at Trevedras, to cross the Lower Denzell to Bolingey road. A semi-circular track shows the route, which is picked up by the bridleway to the east of Bolingey, after it crosses another side stream. The canal reached Menadews Plantation, and continued along its northern edge, where it terminated, about 0.5 miles (0.8 km) short of Whitewater.

The southern section began at Lusty Glaze, where the site of the incline down the cliffs is still clearly visible. It headed east, before sweeping to the south and then the north around Porth Veor and Higher Porth, now both part of Newquay. From Porth, it turned to the east, following the 100-foot (30 m) contour. Its course is marked by several field boundaries as it approaches St Columb Minor. An original bridge still carries the footpath from St Columb Minor to Penrose over the course of the canal. It turned to the south-east to reach Priory Road, and then continued to the east towards Rialton Mill. Near the junction of Priory Road and the A3059 Rialton Road, it turned to the south, to end where the minor road to Rialton Barton leaves the A3059.

An archaeological watching brief was carried out in 2008 when South West Water had to replace a sewage pipeline at Porth. A section through the canal revealed that although preliminary excavation work to create a terrace had been done, the canal had not been completed at that location.

== See also ==
- Canals of Great Britain
- History of the British canal system
- Bude Canal (also by John Edyvean)

== Bibliography ==
- Hadfield, Charles (1967). The Canals of South West England. David and Charles. ISBN 978-0-7153-4176-6.
