= Cross baronets of Marchbank Wood and the City of Glasgow (1912) =

Cross baronets of Marchbank Wood and the City of Glasgow

The Cross baronetcy, of Marchbank Wood in the Parish of Kirkpatrick-Juxta in the County of Dumfries and of the City of Glasgow, was created in the Baronetage of the United Kingdom on 5 July 1912 for Alexander Cross, Member of Parliament for Glasgow Camlachie from 1892 to 1910. He was senior partner in Alexander Cross & Sons, manufacturers of chemicals and seed merchants.

The title became extinct on the death of the 3rd baronet in 1963.

== Cross baronets, of Marchbank Wood and the City of Glasgow (1912) ==
- Sir Alexander Cross, 1st Baronet (1847–1914)
- Sir William Coats Cross, 2nd Baronet (1877–1947)
- Sir Alexander Cross, 3rd Baronet (1880–1963), left no heir.

== Notes ==
Baronetage of the United Kingdom
Preceded by Watson baronets	Cross baronets of Marchbank Wood and the City of Glasgow; 12 July 1912	Succeeded by Scott baronets
