= Scott baronets of Witley (1913) =

Escutcheon of the Scott baronets of Witley

The Scott baronetcy, of Witley in the County of Surrey, was created in the Baronetage of the United Kingdom on 3 February 1913 for the naval commander Admiral Percy Scott.

== Scott baronets, of Witley (1913) ==
- Sir Percy Scott, 1st Baronet (1853–1924)
- Sir Douglas Winchester Scott, 2nd Baronet (1907–1984)
- Sir Anthony Percy Scott, 3rd Baronet (1937–2019)
- Sir Henry Douglas Edward Scott, 4th Baronet (born 1964)

The heir presumptive is the present holder's brother Simon James Scott (born 1965).

== Notes ==
Baronetage of the United Kingdom
Preceded by Cross baronets	Scott baronets of Witley; 3 February 1913	Succeeded by Levy baronets
