= Greta Valentine =

Greta Mary Valentine née Sequeira (1907–1998). She became a muse to the painter Lamorna Birch and an obsession of Aleister Crowley. She married Birch's patron, Ranald Valentine, who was a printer in Dundee.

== Life ==
She was born in 1907 and at some point she was adopted by Nellie (born Adams) and James Henry Sequeira. Her adopted father was a dermatologist. She was educated well in the UK and in Europe. She went on to study Anthroposophy which was a spiritualist movement created by Rudolf Steiner.

In 1936 she met Aleister Crowley who had an unusual reputation as an occult magician.

Valentine met Lamorna Birch when she was 28 and she was on holiday with her parents in Cornwall. Lamorna Birch lived in Lamorna. He had taken the unusual name to differentiate himself from another artist named Birch. Lamorna was married but he was intrigued by Greta. He would write her poetry and create paintings for her. Symbolism within the paintings expressed his love for her. While she was in Cornwall she was visited by Aleister Crowley who was trying to woo her.

Valentine introduced Crowley to her artist friend Lady Frieda Harris and as a result it was decided to create a new Tarot pack. Crowley suggested that they update an existing pack by modifying the designs but Lady Frieda Harris suggested that there should be 74 new paintings. The clincher was that she offered to pay the destitute Crowley two pounds a week until the project was completed.

Lamorna introduced her to the printer Ranald Valentine who she would marry. Ranald died in 1956. She died in 1998.
