= Lamorna Birch =

English painter (1869–1955)

Lamorna Birch RA RWS
- Born: Samuel John Birch; 7 June 1869; Egremont, Cheshire, England
- Died: 7 January 1955 (aged 85); Penzance, Cornwall, England

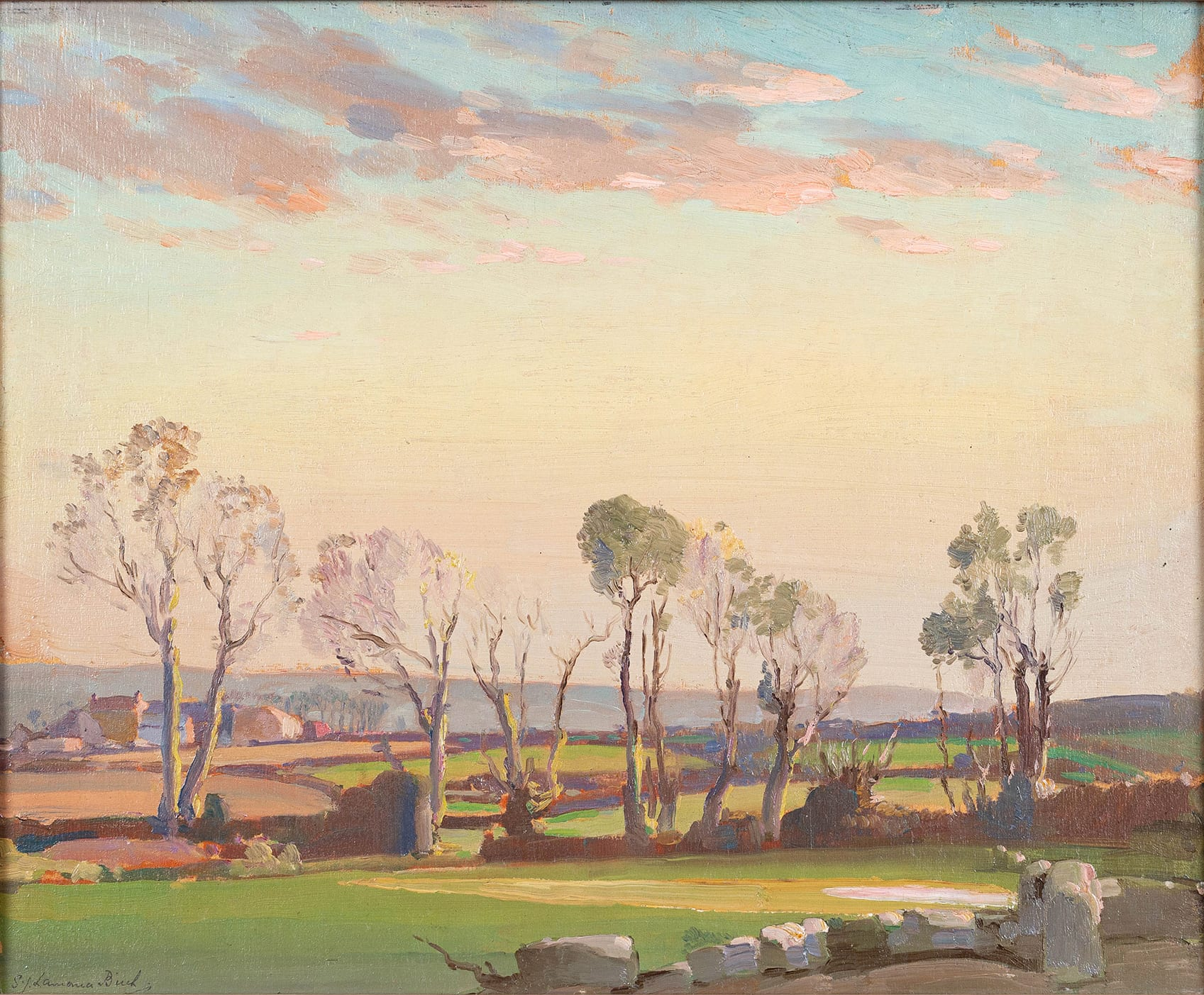
Frosty evening at Sancreed, near Lands End, 13 x 15.75 inches, oils

Samuel John "Lamorna" Birch, RA, RWS (7 June 1869 – 7 January 1955) was an English painter, mainly of landscapes, in oils and watercolours. He became a member of the Newlyn School in Cornwall. At the suggestion of fellow artist Stanhope Forbes, Birch adopted the soubriquet "Lamorna" to distinguish himself from Lionel Birch, an artist who was also working in the area at that time.

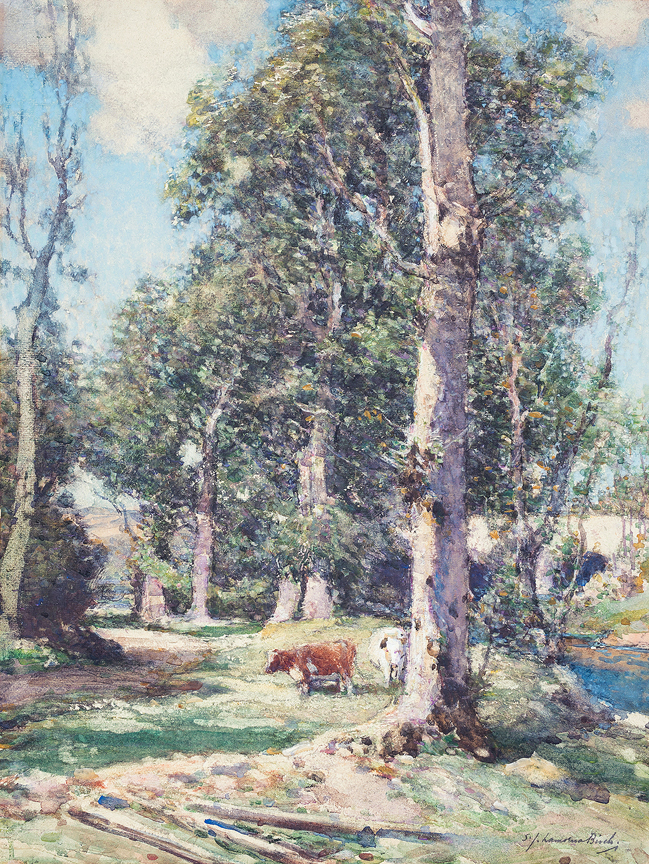
Light and Shade, Cornwall, c. 1900, watercolour

== Biography ==
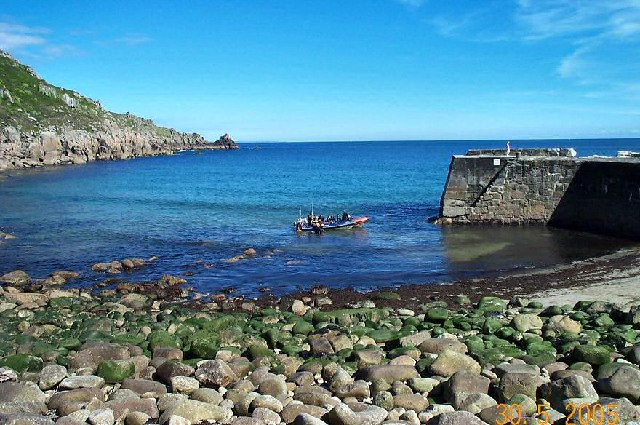
Lamorna Cove (here in 2005) was a frequent subject for his paintings.

Lamorna Birch was born in Egremont, Cheshire, England. He was self-taught as an artist, except for a brief period of study at the Académie Colarossi in Paris during 1895.

Birch settled in Lamorna, Cornwall in 1892, initially lodging at nearby Boleigh Farm. Many of his most famous pictures date from this time and the beautiful Lamorna Cove is usually their subject matter. He was attracted to Cornwall by the Newlyn group of artists but he ended up starting a second group based around his adopted home of Lamorna. He married Houghton (Mouse) Emily Vivian, the daughter of a mining agent from Camborne and they lived at Flagstaff Cottage, Lamorna.

In 1936, Birch embarked on an extensive painting and lecture tour in New Zealand. He was accompanied on his visit by fellow artists Kathleen Airini Vane and Russell Clark. Birch would paint many of the scenic areas of Northland together with Vane, and embark on skiing expeditions with Clark. At the end of his visit, Vane would present several works by Birch to the Christchurch Art Gallery which remain in its collection.

== Personal life ==
Greta Valentine met Birch when she was 28 and she was on holiday with her parents in Cornwall. Lamorna was married but he was intrigued by Greta. He would write her poetry and create paintings for her. Symbolism within the paintings expressed his love for her.

== Exhibitions ==
He exhibited at the Royal Academy from 1893, was elected as an Associate (ARA) in 1926 and made a Royal Academician (RA) in 1934, and showed more than two hundred paintings there. He held his first one-man exhibition at the Fine Art Society in 1906 and is said to have produced more than 20,000 pictures. Like a number of his contemporaries, he was profiled as an 'Artist of Note' in The Artist magazine, by Richard Seddon, in the June 1944 edition.

- Shades of British Impressionism Lamorna Birch and his Circle was shown at Warrington Museum & Art Gallery in the Mezzanine in October 2004. This details his links with Henry Scott Tuke and Thomas Cooper Gotch and many others who settled in the artists' colony in the 1880s and 1890s. "These painters helped to change the face of British art. Their emphasis on colour and light, truth and social realism brought about a revolution in British art." says the catalogue for the show.
- Entranced by a Special Place: The Art of S J Lamorna Birch – at Penlee House, Penzance, part of the Royal Academy's 250th anniversary celebrations.

== Today ==
Birch has paintings at Penlee House and in the collection of Derby Art Gallery. Christchurch Art Gallery also holds the aforementioned works presented by Kathleen Airini Vane and works acquired through other means.
