= Boleigh =

Coordinates: 50.0692°N 5.5839°W

Boleigh: Cornish: Boslegh
- Location within Cornwall
- Unitary authority: Cornwall
- Ceremonial county: Cornwall
- Region: South West
- Country: England
- Sovereign state: United Kingdom
- Post town: Penzance
- Postcode district: TR19
- Police: Devon and Cornwall
- Fire: Cornwall
- Ambulance: South Western

Boleigh (Cornish: Boslegh, meaning Slab Dwelling) is a hamlet southeast of St Buryan in west Cornwall, UK. The Newlyn School artist, Samuel Birch, later known as Lamorna Birch came to Cornwall in 1892, initially staying at Boleigh Farm.
