= Tangi =

Tangi is a Breton given name and surname for men. It may refer to:

- Tangi, Odisha, a town in India
- Tangi, Iran, a place in Sistan and Baluchestan Province, Iran
- Tangi, Pakistan
  - Tangi Tehsil, Pakistan, whose seat is Tangi
- Land Rover Tangi, an armoured vehicle used in Northern Ireland
- Tangihanga, a Māori funeral rite

== See also ==
- Tanguy (disambiguation), the French spelling of Tangi
