= Towan Head =

Coordinates: 50.425°N 5.099°W

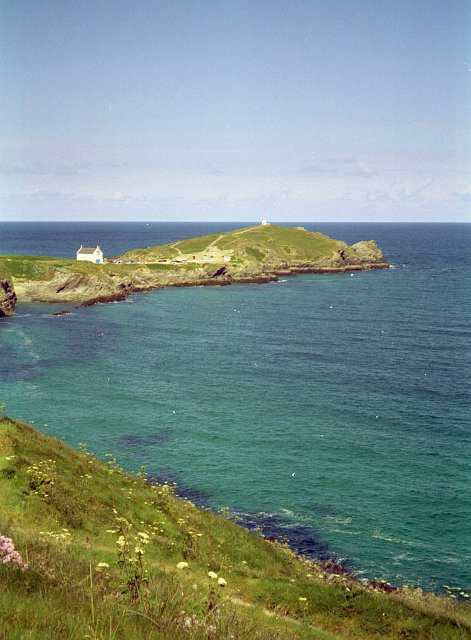
Towan Head

Towan Head (Cornish: Penn Tewyn) is a headland one mile west of Newquay on the north coast of Cornwall, England, United Kingdom. It is at the western end of Newquay Bay. The headland points north and Fistral Beach is immediately to the south.
