= Watson baronets of Sulhamstead (1912) =

Extinct baronetcy

Watson baronets
- Arms of the Watson baronets of Sulhamstead
- Creation date: 1912
- Status: extinct
- Extinction date: 1983
- Motto: Esto quod esse videris, Be what thou seemest to be
- Arms: Argent, a chevron Azure between three martlets Sable all within a bordure of the Second, charged with eight crescents of the First.
- Crest: A gryphon’s head erased Sable, gorged with a crown palisado Or, holding in its beak a sprig of oak fructed Proper.

The Watson baronetcy, of Sulhamstead in the parish of Sulhamstead Abbots in the County of Berkshire, was created in the Baronetage of the United Kingdom on 11 July 1912 for William George Watson, founder of the Maypole Dairy Company.

The title became extinct on the death of the 2nd Baronet in 1983.

== Watson baronets, of Sulhamstead (1912) ==
- Sir William George Watson, 1st Baronet (1861–1930)
- Sir Norman James Watson, 2nd Baronet (1897–1983)

== Notes ==
Baronetage of the United Kingdom
Preceded by Tangye baronets	Watson baronets of Sulhamstead; 11 July 1912	Succeeded by Cross baronets
