= Lamorna =

Village in Cornwall, England

Coordinates: 50.06295°N 5.56440°W

Lamorna: Cornish: Nansmornow
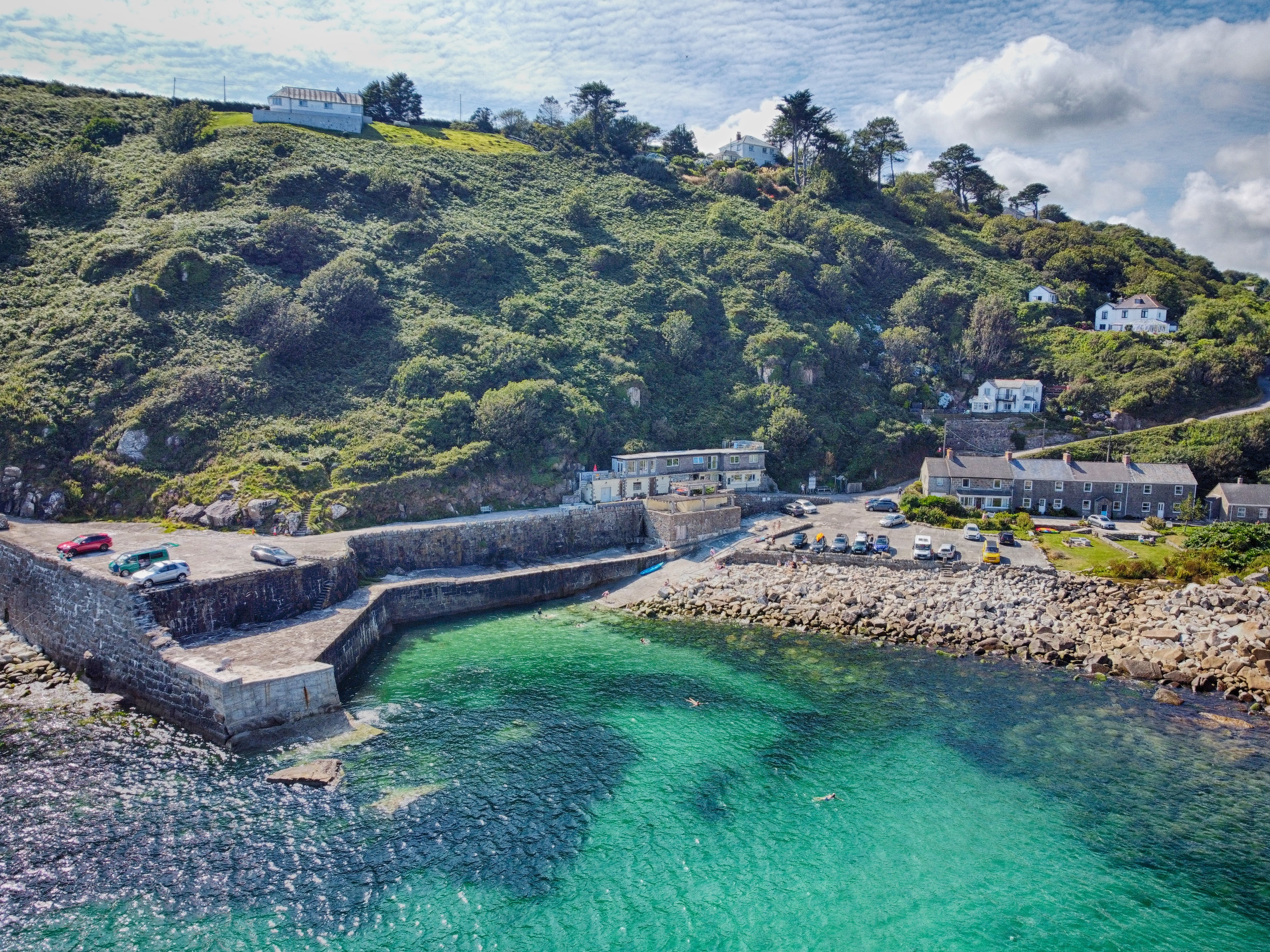
- Lamorna harbour

- Location within Cornwall
- OS grid reference: SW449234
- Civil parish: St Buryan, Lamorna and Paul
- Unitary authority: Cornwall
- Ceremonial county: Cornwall
- Region: South West
- Country: England
- Sovereign state: United Kingdom
- Post town: Penzance
- Postcode district: TR19
- Dialling code: 01736
- Police: Devon and Cornwall
- Fire: Cornwall
- Ambulance: South Western
- UK Parliament: St Ives

Lamorna (Cornish: Nansmornow) is a village, valley and cove in west Cornwall, England, UK. It is on the Penwith peninsula approximately 4 miles (6 km) south of Penzance. Lamorna became popular with the artists of the Newlyn School, including Alfred Munnings, Laura Knight and Harold Knight, and is also known for former residents Derek and Jean Tangye who farmed land and wrote "The Minack Chronicles".

== Toponymy ==
First recorded as Nansmorno (in 1305), than Nansmurnou (1309), Nansmorne (1319), Nansmornou (1339), Nansmorna (1387) and Namorna (1388). In Cornish Nans means valley, and the 2nd element is possibly mor, which means sea.

== Geography ==
Lamorna Cove is at the SE end of a north-west to south-east valley. The cove is delineated by Carn-du (Black Rock) on the eastern side and Lamorna Point on the western side. The valley is privately owned from The Wink (public house) down to the cove, which is reached by a narrow lane to the car park and quay. The small village, half a mile inland, was originally known as Nantewas. The South West Coast Path passes around the cove.

Lamorna lies within the Cornwall Area of Outstanding Natural Beauty (AONB); almost a third of Cornwall has AONB designation, with the same status and protection as a National Park.

== History ==
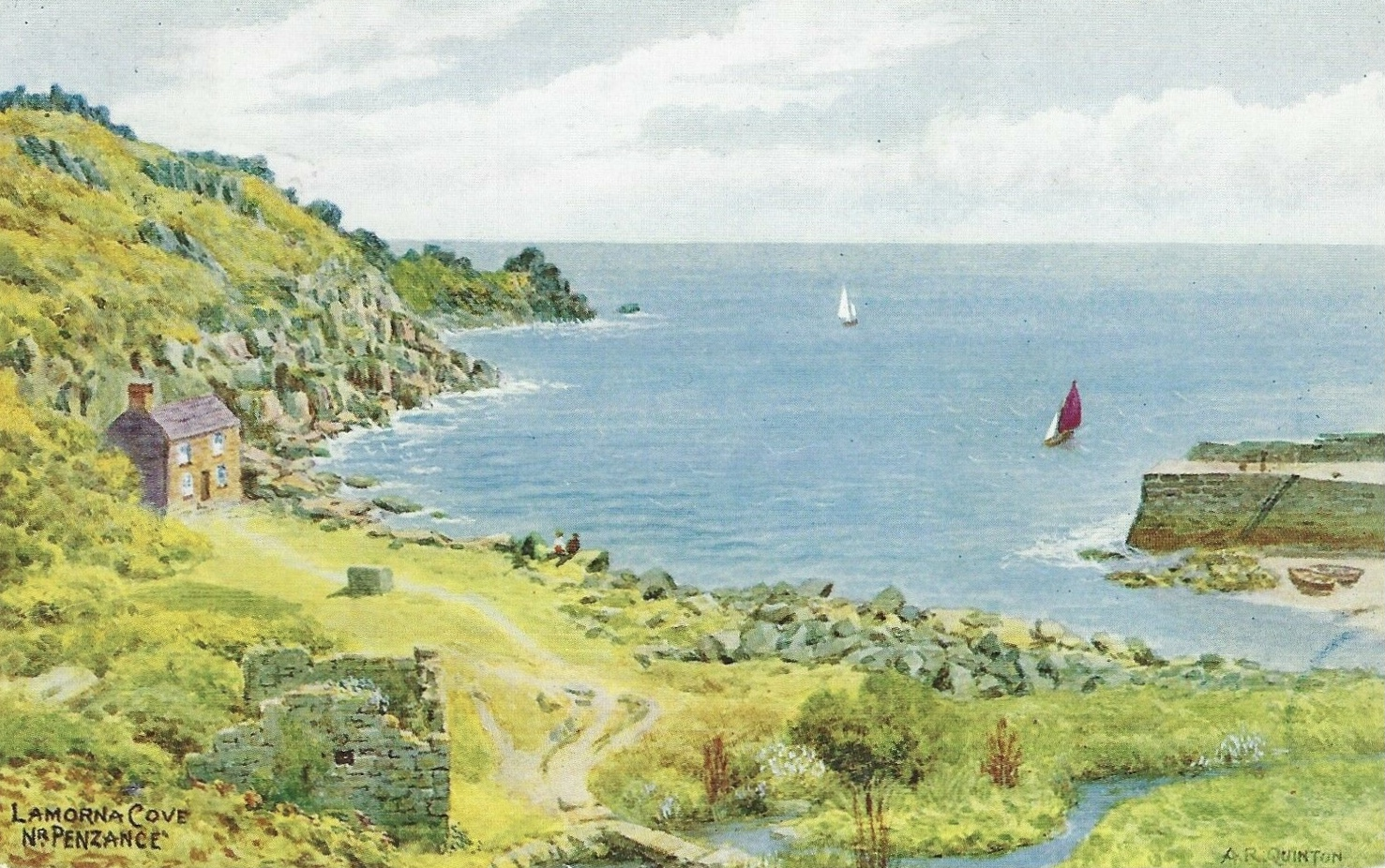
Lamorna Cove by A. R. Quinton, c. 1920

The first record of tin streaming is in the 1380s when Alan Hoskyn was killed (murder was not proven) during a dispute with Trewoofe, after the stream was diverted. Mounds along the stream are evidence of past activity. Kemyel Mill was operated by the Hoskyn family from at least the 14th century until the 1920s, but is now a gift shop under different ownership. There were two mills: one milled corn for animal feed, and the other flour. Both mills are grade II listed buildings.

In the 17th century a privateer vessel owned by the Penrose family was regularly moored in the cove and was wrecked during a storm. At one time five cannon were on the sea floor in 15 m (49 ft) of water, and one is now at Stoney Cove, Leicestershire where it is used at an underwater archaeological training area. A number of silver coins found in 1984 and 1985 include one dated 1653. The wreck is a popular diving site.

A school for fifty to sixty infant boys and girls opened for the first time in the village in March 1881. The schoolroom, with a screen at the eastern end, was paid for by Canon Coulson and built on land on which he owned the freehold. The room converted to a mission room for Anglicans by removing a screen to reveal a chancel; the converted chapel had a capacity of 70–80 for services. Previously children had to go to St Buryan, some 4 km away, for schooling.

The valley is now tree-covered, but until around the 1950s the stream- and hillside were grazed by cows, horses and pigs. On the slopes, daffodils and early potatoes were grown; the flowers were sent to markets at Covent Garden (London), Birmingham and Wales.

== Community radio ==
The local community radio station is Coast FM (formerly Penwith Radio), which broadcasts on 96.5 and 97.2 FM.

== Quarries ==
Waste tips on the eastern side of the cove are a reminder of the granite quarries first opened in 1849 by John Freeman, on St Aubyn land, which were worked until 1911. The stone was used in a number of important constructions, including Admiralty Pier at Dover, London County Council offices, the Thames Embankment and Portland Breakwater.

It was also used locally to build the Bishop Rock Lighthouse, Mousehole north pier and the Wolf Rock Lighthouse. Granite was dragged by chains to an iron pier, where the stream enters the sea, and transported by ship. A plinth weighing 20 tons was sent by sea to The Great Exhibition of 1851 but eventually, due to the hazards of loading ships, granite was sent by road via Kemyal and Paul Hill through Newlyn, to the cutting yards in Wherrytown. The present quay was built in the late 19th century, possibly rebuilt on an older quay, and is a grade II listed building.

A quarry on the west side of the cove failed due to the high quartz content of the granite. On 16 June 1881, an area of 20 acres (8.1 ha), known as the ″Lamorna Harbour Works″, was put up for auction at the Mart, Tokenhouse Yard, City of London. The property, on both sides of the valley, included ″the exceedingly valuable″ granite quarry with harbour, wharf and pier, a powder magazine, lime and mill house, carpenter's shops, 12 horse-power water-wheel, foreman's residence and a "substantial and superior" dwelling-house. Despite the sale claiming the granite quarry was ″exceeding valuable″, two years later Freeman and Sons only employed four men at the quarry and the average-sized blocks were of inferior quality compared with the quarry at nearby Sheffield.

The Lamorna Cove Hotel, built in the 1870s and known as Cliffe House, was originally the quarry manager's home, and had a school and chapel (with bell tower) for the quarry workers and their families. It was first used as a hotel in the 1920s. During the Second World War it was occupied by seven French fishing families who fished out of Newlyn.

== Newlyn School of Art and the Lamorna Colony ==
In the late 19th and early 20th centuries Lamorna became popular with artists of the Newlyn School. It is particularly associated with the artist S J "Lamorna" Birch who lived there from 1908. The colony included Birch, Alfred Munnings, Laura Knight and Harold Knight. This period is dramatised in the 1998 novel Summer in February by Jonathan Smith, which was adapted for the 2013 movie directed by Christopher Menaul. Lamorna was also the home of the jeweller Ella Naper and her husband, the painter Charles, who built Trewoofe House. The Lamorna Arts Festival was launched in 2009 to celebrate the original Lamorna Colony and today's Lamorna art community.

== Lamorna in culture ==
Lamorna has been immortalised in the song "Way Down to Lamorna", about a wayward husband receiving his comeuppance from his wife. The song is beloved of many Cornish singers, including Brenda Wootton.

The actor Robert Newton (1905–1956) was educated in Lamorna and his ashes were scattered in the sea off Lamorna by his son, Nicholas Newton.

The authors Derek Tangye and Jean Tangye lived above Lamorna where he wrote his famous books "The Minack Chronicles". A piece of land called "Oliver Land" has been preserved as a wildlife sanctuary in memory of the couple. Lamorna was the village used in the novel The Memory Garden by Rachel Hore (2007) and was a location used for the shooting of Sam Peckinpah's 1971 thriller Straw Dogs. Lamorna Cove was the title of a poem by W. H. Davies published in 1929.

The pub is the subject of a novel by Martha Grimes, entitled The Lamorna Wink. The interior contains an important collection of maritime artefacts.

The Lamorna Pottery was founded in 1947 by Christopher James Ludlow (known as Jimmy) and Derek Wilshaw. It is currently a working pottery, gift shop and café.

== Gallery ==
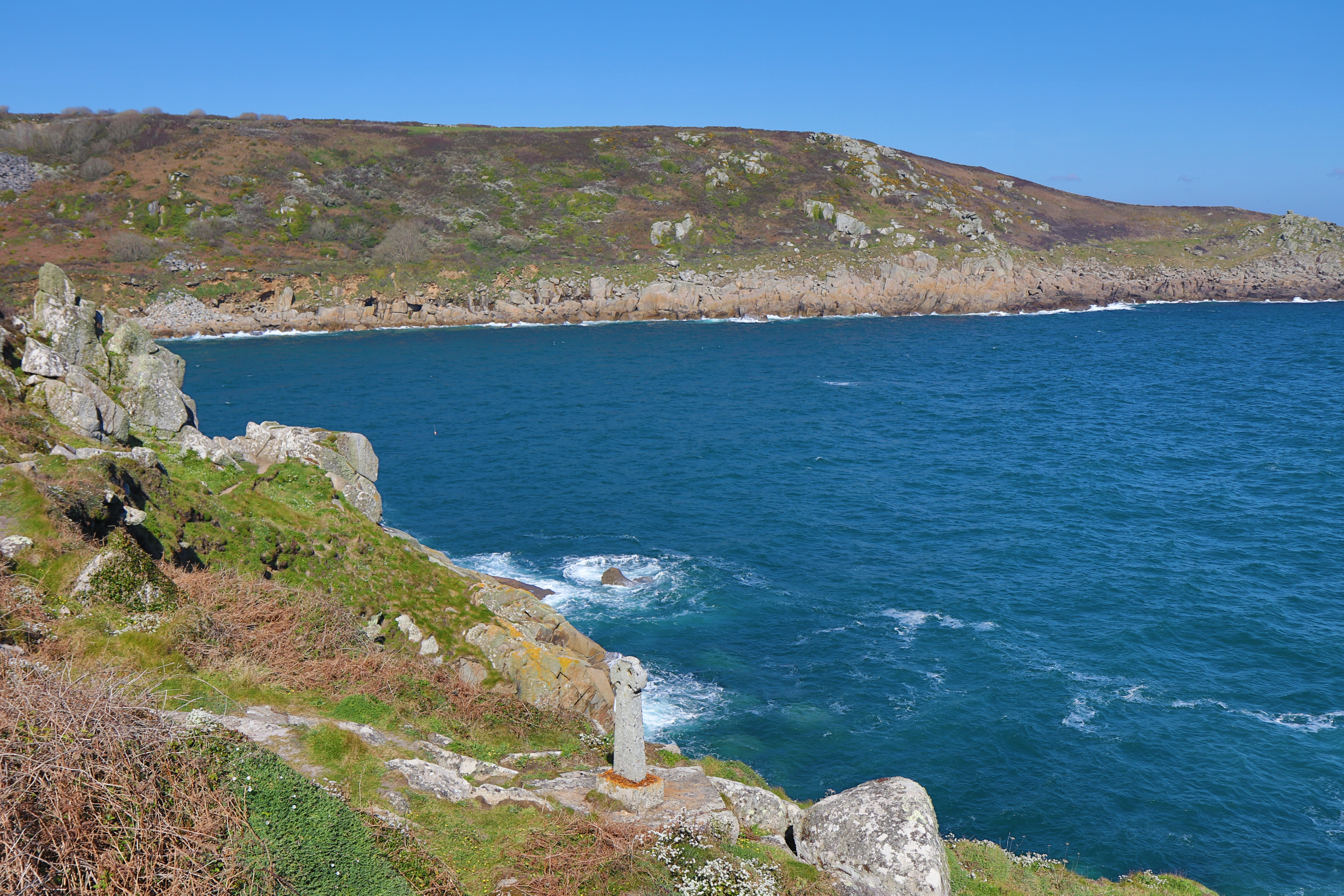
Looking out from Lamorna Cove Cornwall

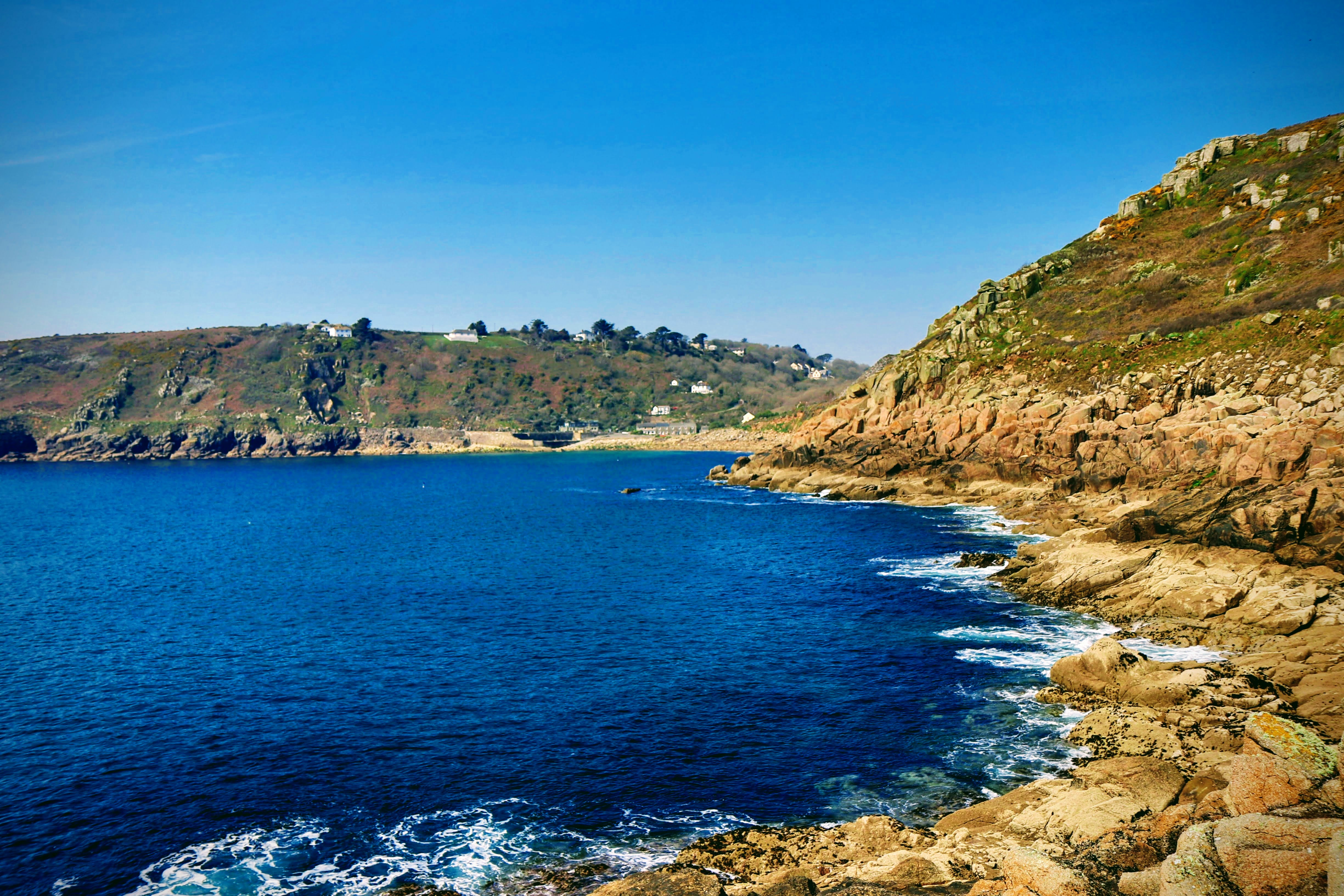
Looking over to Lamorna Cove Cornwall

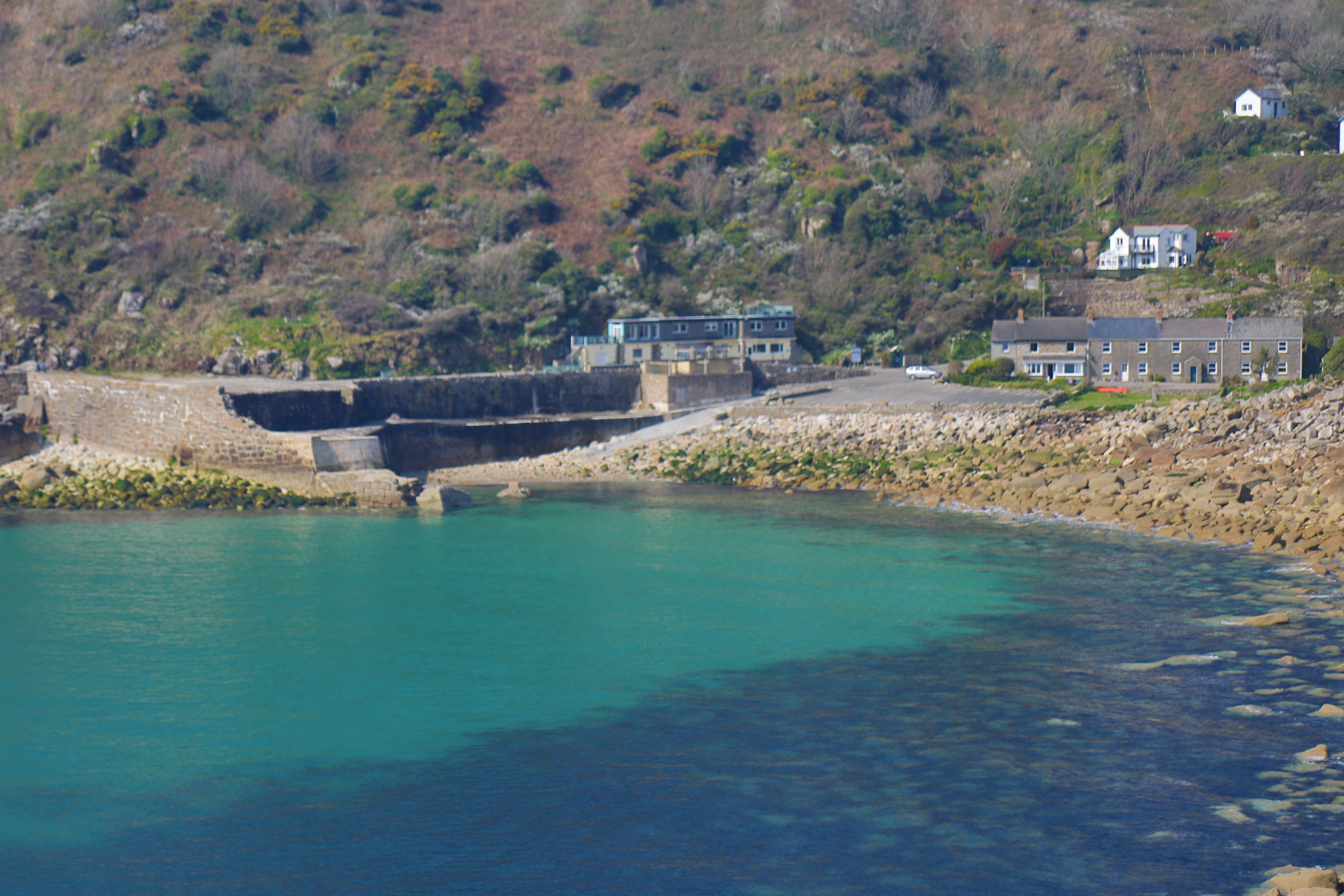
Lamorna Cove harbour Cornwall

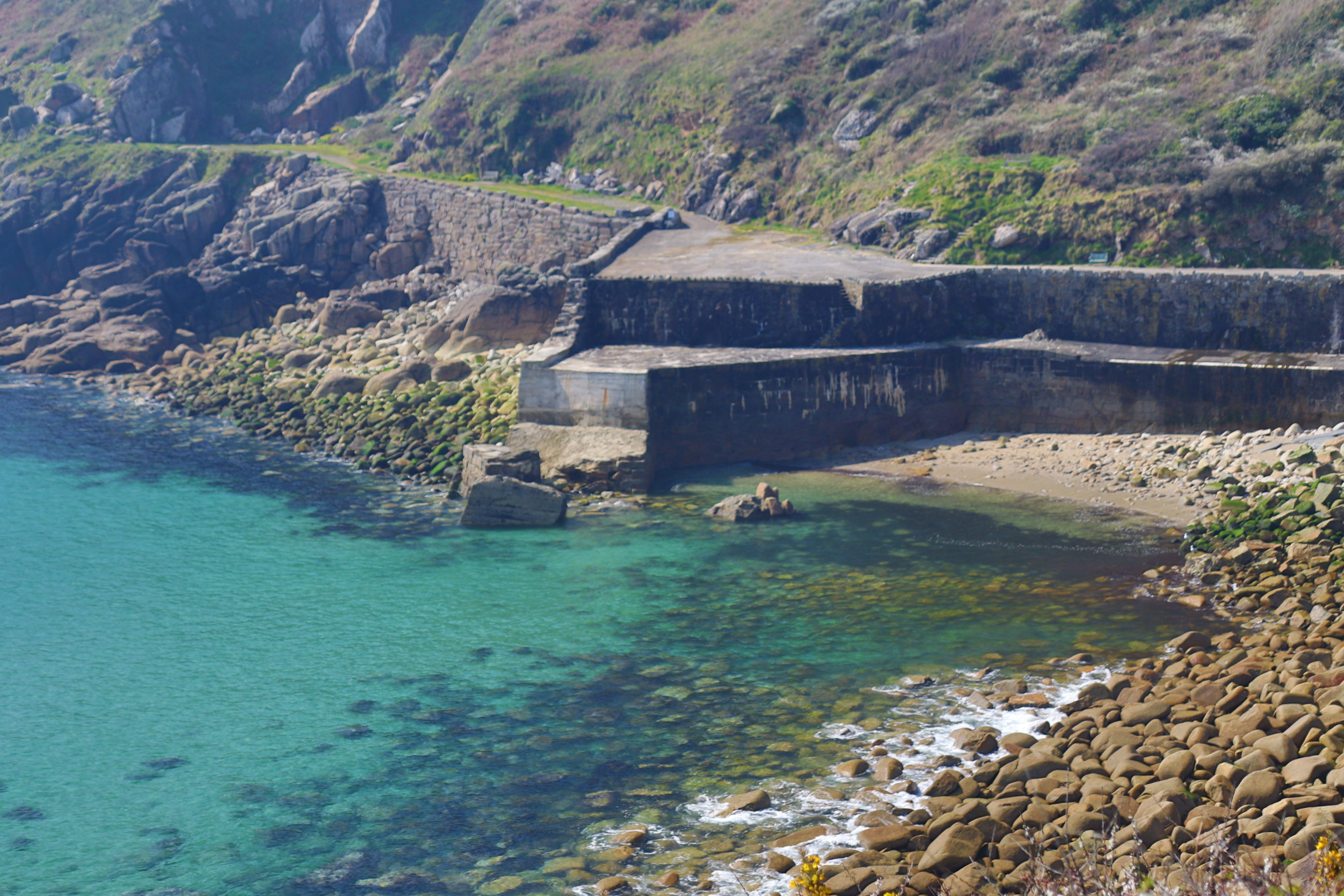
Lamorna Cove Cornwall
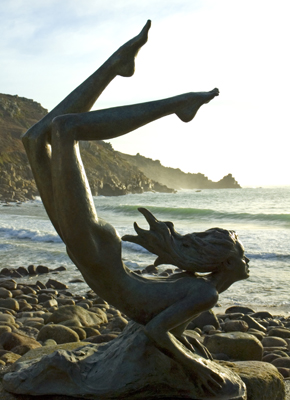
Naiad by Lamorna artist Colin Caffell

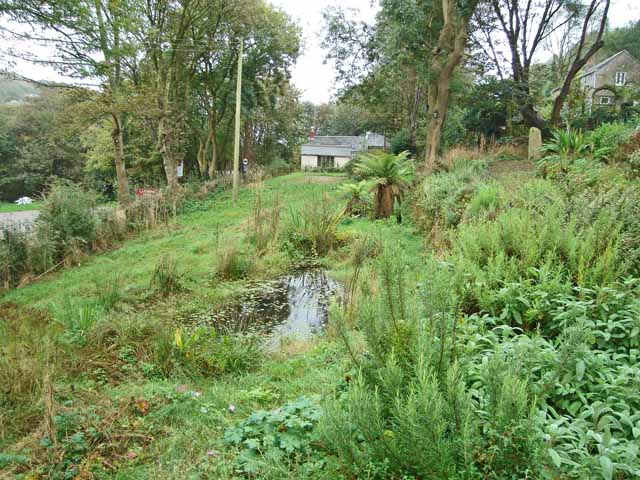
Millennium gardens at Lamorna
