= Lady Marguerite Tangye =

British debutante, model, and actress

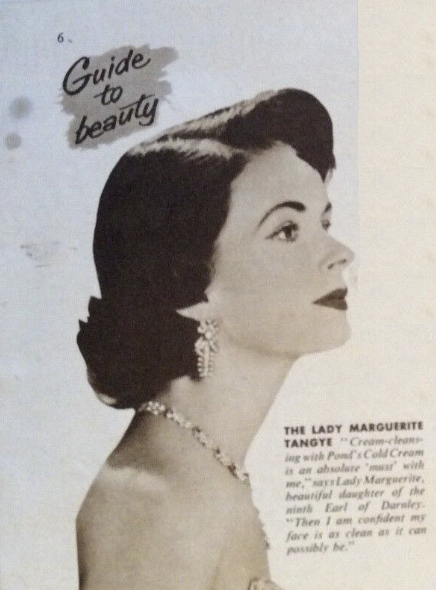
- Lady Marguerite Tangye in 1953
- Born: 24 April 1913; Hampstead, England
- Died: 10 October 2002 (aged 89)
- Spouse(s): Claud Dobree Strickland (1934–41); Gordon Haywood (1942–51); Nigel Tangye (1951–64)
- Children: Lucinda Haywood, Gareth Haywood
- Parent(s): Esme Ivo Bligh, 9th Earl of Darnley; Daphne Rachel Mulholland

Lady Marguerite Tangye (24 April 1913 – 10 October 2002), born Lady Marguerite Rose Bligh, was a British debutante, model, and actress in 1930s London. She the daughter of Esme Ivo Bligh, the 9th Earl of Darnley, and Daphne Mulholland. Lady Marguerite worked for the Mechanised Transport Corps in World War II and in later life held a variety of jobs as well as writing about her childhood in Brazil.

== Life ==
Lady Marguerite's parents separated when she was three (divorcing in 1920) and her mother Daphne, along with Marguerite and her brother Peter, went to live with her parents, Alfred and Mabel Mulholland, at Worlingham Hall, Beccles.

Daphne Mulholland then married Hugo Chandor, an old Etonian sheep farmer recently returned from Argentina. The new family moved to Três Barras, in rural central Brazil, to build a sawmill. Following a revolution in São Paulo they were cut off completely for six months. After five years in Brazil, they returned to England and went back to Worlingham.

Lady Marguerite attended Belstead School for two years from the ages of 13-15 but had little other formal education. She was a debutante and was presented at Court in 1931 and wore 'a gown of ivory and silver lace and net over flesh pink crêpe de Chine' with a silver train.

In 1991 Lady Marguerite was interviewed about her youth by Thames Television, as part of their historical programme 'The River Thames' (Episode Four).

== Work ==
Lady Marguerite modelled for advertisements for Pond's cream, Will's Gold Flake, Kirbigrips, and Horlicks. Although she was a non-smoker and rarely drank alcohol, Lady Marguerite was often featured in cigarette and alcohol advertisements of the 1930s. She was widely photographed as a model and copies of her portrait photographs are held by the National Portrait Gallery. She was photographed by Antony Beauchamp and Baron.

In 1939, Gerald Brockhurst painted Lady Marguerite. The realist painting, entitled By the Hills, achieved the top price at the Royal Academy summer exhibition that year. The painting is now held by the Ferens Art Gallery.

During the war she served in the Mechanised Transport Corps, teaching soldiers how to dismantle engines, but was dismissed after the photographer Baron took her photograph without a hair net. She also served as an ambulance driver in the London Blitz.

With her third husband, Nigel Tangye, Lady Marguerite ran the Glendorgal Hotel, his seaside home near Newquay, from 1951. She took on responsibility for cleaning, bar tending, and in the evenings sang accompanied by visiting jazz musicians. Following her divorce from Nigel Tangye in 1964, Lady Marguerite returned to London and worked various administrative jobs including at the Post Office and as a query clerk at Harrods.

== Animal welfare ==
Lady Marguerite was a lifelong vegetarian and supporter of animal welfare causes and charities. She was a member of the Animal Defence League, and travelled to Algiers to help rescue sick and maltreated animals with her Sicilian friend Marie Ruperto. On the outbreak of World War II, fearing an invasion of the east coast, Lady Marguerite and her friend Rosemary Potter took a carthorse and polo pony on a nine-day journey (carrying fodder) from Worlingham to a safer location in Gloucestershire.

== Selected publications ==
- A Brazilian Childhood
