= Differential pulley =

Self-balancing mechanical lifting hoist

Comparison of a differential pulley (left) and a differential windlass or Chinese windlass (right). The rope of the windlass is depicted as spirals for clarity, but is more likely helices with axes perpendicular to the image.

A differential pulley—also called "Weston differential pulley", sometimes "differential hoist", "chain hoist", or colloquially "chain fall"—is used to manually lift very heavy objects like car engines. It is operated by pulling upon the slack section of a continuous chain that wraps around two pulleys on a common shaft. (The two pulleys are joined together such that they rotate as a unit on the single shaft that they share.) The relative sizing of the two connected pulleys determines the maximum weight that can be lifted by hand. If the pulley radii are close enough, then the load will remain in place (and not lower under the force of gravity) until the chain is pulled.

== History ==
The differential pulley was invented in 1854 by Thomas Aldridge Weston from King's Norton, England.

The pulleys were manufactured in collaboration with Richard and George Tangye. According to Richard Tangye's autobiography, the Weston differential pulley evolved from the Chinese windlass, with an endless chain replacing the finite length of rope. He claimed that many engineering firms conceded on the difficulty of efficiently disengaging the chain from the teeth as the pulleys turned, but his firm developed a "pitch" chain which solved the issue. Marketed as "Weston Differential Pulley Blocks with Patent Chain Guides", the pulley had good sales, namely, 3000 sets in 9 months. It was displayed in 5 sizes—from 10 long hundredweight (510 kg) to 3 long tons (3,000 kg)—at the 1862 International Exhibition in London and received a medal for "original application, practical utility and success".

An ironmonger challenged the Tangyes that the pulley had been in use for 30 years before Weston's patent but the judge, William Page Wood ruled in favour of the Tangyes because the engaging mechanism was substantially different from the one presented as evidence.

The Yale Lock Company acquired the patent rights in 1876.

A dumb pulley can lift very large masses a short distance. It consists of two fixed pulleys of unequal radii that are attached to each other and rotate together, a single pulley bearing the load, and an endless rope looped around the pulleys. To avoid slippage, the rope is usually replaced by a chain, and the connected pulleys by sprockets.

The two sections of chain carrying the single pulley exert opposing and unequal torques on the connected pulleys, such that only the difference of these torques has to be compensated manually by pulling the loose part of the chain. This leads to a mechanical advantage: the force needed to lift a load is only a fraction of the load's weight. At the same time, the distance the load is lifted is smaller than the length of chain pulled by the same factor. This factor (the mechanical advantage MA) depends on the relative difference of the radii r and R of the connected pulleys:

$$M\!A = \frac{2 R}{R-r} = \frac{2}{1 - \frac{r}{R}}$$

The effect on the forces and distances (see figure) is quantitatively:

$$F_\mathrm{Z}=\frac{F_\mathrm{L}}{M\!A}\quad,\quad h=\frac{s}{M\!A}\quad.$$

The difference in radii can be made very small, making the mechanical advantage of this pulley system very large. In the extreme case of zero difference in radii, MA becomes infinite, thus no force (besides friction) is needed to move the chain, but moving the chain will no longer lift the load.

At the other extreme, when r is zero, the system becomes a simple gun tackle with a mechanical advantage of 2.

Example of a differential pulley

The same principle is used in a differential windlass, where the connected pulleys are replaced by winches.

== Calculation of mechanical advantage ==
In the above graphic, the four segments of the chain are labelled W, X, Y and Z. The magnitudes of their corresponding forces are F_{W}, F_{X}, F_{Y} and F_{Z}, respectively.

Assuming that the chain is massless, F_{X} = 0 because segment X is not supporting any weight.

Taking the system at equilibrium, F_{W} and F_{Y} are equal—if they were not, the lower pulley would freely turn until they were.

Next, the downward force acting on the lower pulley equals the upward forces acting on it, so

F_{L} = F_{W} + F_{Y}, or 2F_{W} because F_{W} = F_{Y}.

Additionally, there is no net torque or moment around the compound pulley, so the clockwise torque is equal to the anticlockwise torque:

F_{W} R + F_{X} r = F_{Y} r + F_{Z} R .

Substituting F_{X} and F_{Y} from the above equations,

F_{W} R + 0 = F_{W} r + F_{Z} R .

Rearranging gives

F_{W} = F_{Z} · R/(R − r) .

As F_{W} = (F _{L})/2,

(F _{L})/2 = F_{Z} · R/(R − r) .

Finally, the mechanical advantage, (F _{L})/(F _{Z}) = (2 R)/(R − r) or 2/(1 − r/R ) .

A much simpler method of calculating mechanical advantage can be accomplished by simply counting and comparing the chain link pockets in the two differentially-sized sprockets. Let's call the number of pockets in the two respective sprockets P_{1} (larger) and P_{2} (smaller).

In lifting a load, for each full revolution of the double sprocket assembly, P_{1} chain link pairs (alternate perpendicular links fit between pockets) will be taken up by the larger sprocket while P_{2} chain link pairs are released by the smaller sprocket, for a net gain of P_{1} − P_{2} chain link pairs.

The mechanical advantage would equal the ratio of chain link pairs required for each revolution to the net gain of chain link pairs. Put another way, the mechanical advantage would be the distance of pull required for each unit distance of gain. The mechanical advantage at the differential sprocket pair equals P_{1}/(P_{1} − P_{2}).

Because there is a traveling pulley at the load, this doubles the mechanical advantage of the fixed (anchored) sprocket assembly, leading to a total mechanical advantage of 2 × P_{1}/(P_{1} − P_{2}).

For instance, a 1-ton differential chain fall might have a 15-pocket and a 14-pocket sprocket set. This would provide a total of 2 × 15/(15 − 14), or 30:1 mechanical advantage.

== See also ==
- Block and tackle
- Hoist
