= Tanguy =

Tanguy is the French spelling of Breton given name Tangi from tan, "fire", and ki, "dog". It may refer to:

== People ==
=== Given name ===
- Saint Tanguy, sixth-century Breton monk and abbey founder
- Tanguy Malmanche (1875–1953), Breton writer
- Tanguy Nef (born 1996), Swiss alpine skier
- Tanguy Ndombele (born 1996), French footballer
- Tanguy Kouassi (born 2002), French footballer

=== Surname ===
- Julien Tanguy (art dealer) (1825–1894), Parisian art supply and art dealer, and subject of three Van Gogh paintings
- Yves Tanguy (1900–1955), French surrealist painter

== Media ==
- Tanguy, a 1957 novel by Michel del Castillo
- Tanguy (film), a 2001 French black comedy film
- Tanguy et Laverdure, a French comic about two air force pilots

== See also ==
- Tanneguy du Châtel (1369–1449), Grand Master of France
