= Trevelgue Head =

Headland on the North Coast of Cornwall, England

Trevelgue Head Porth Island
- Headland
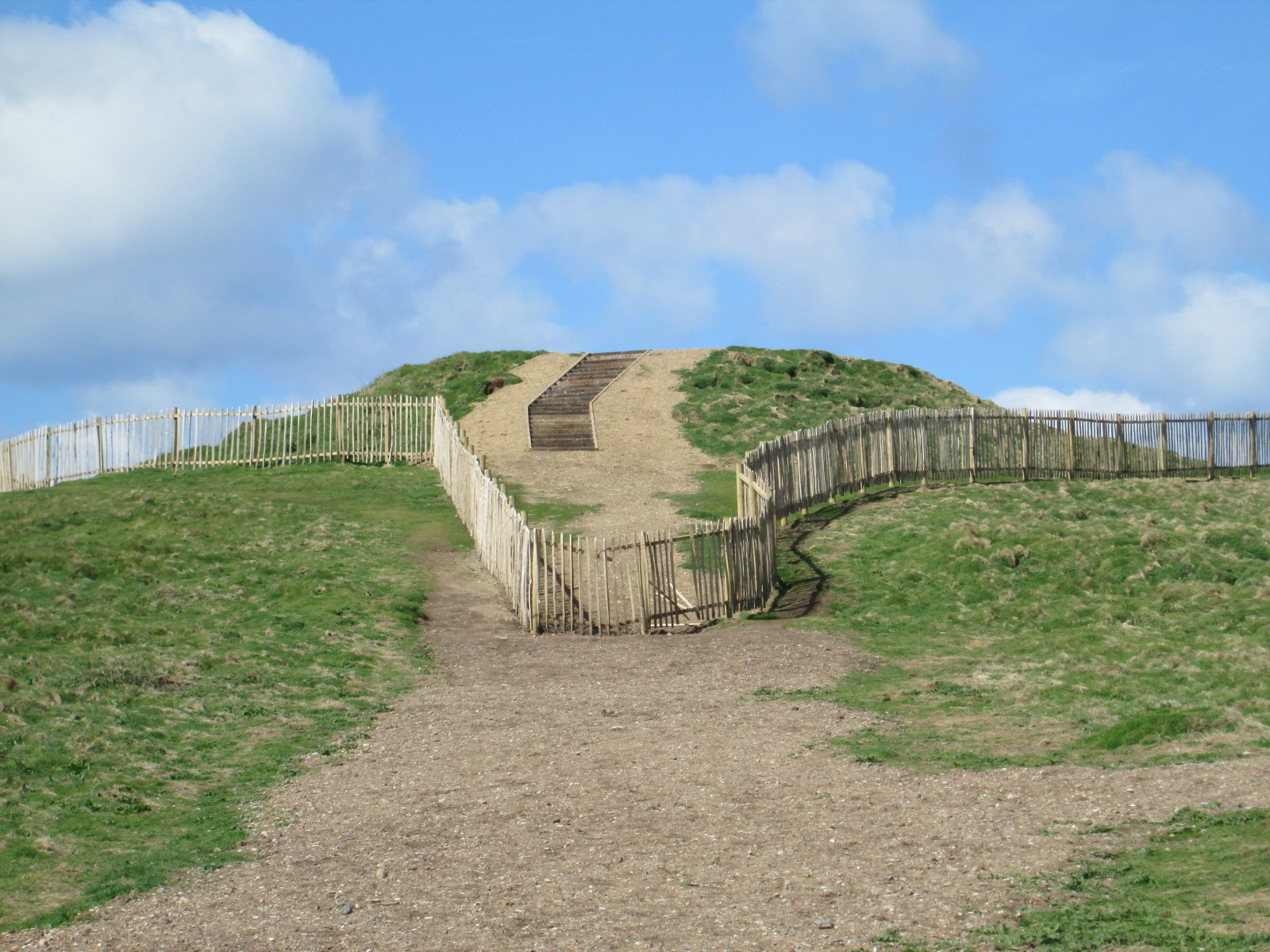
- The round barrow at the western end of the peninsula

- Coordinates: 50°25′37″N 5°03′46″W
- Grid position: SW825630
- Location: Cornwall
- Age: Iron Age; Bronze Age
- Designation: Scheduled monument
- Website: https://historicengland.org.uk/listing/the-list/list-entry/1006712

Trevelgue Head, also known as Porth Island, is a headland north-east of Newquay, Cornwall, England, next to Porth at the eastern end of Newquay Bay.

It is the site of an Iron Age promontory fort with defensive ramparts and two round barrows dating from the early Bronze Age.

== Features ==
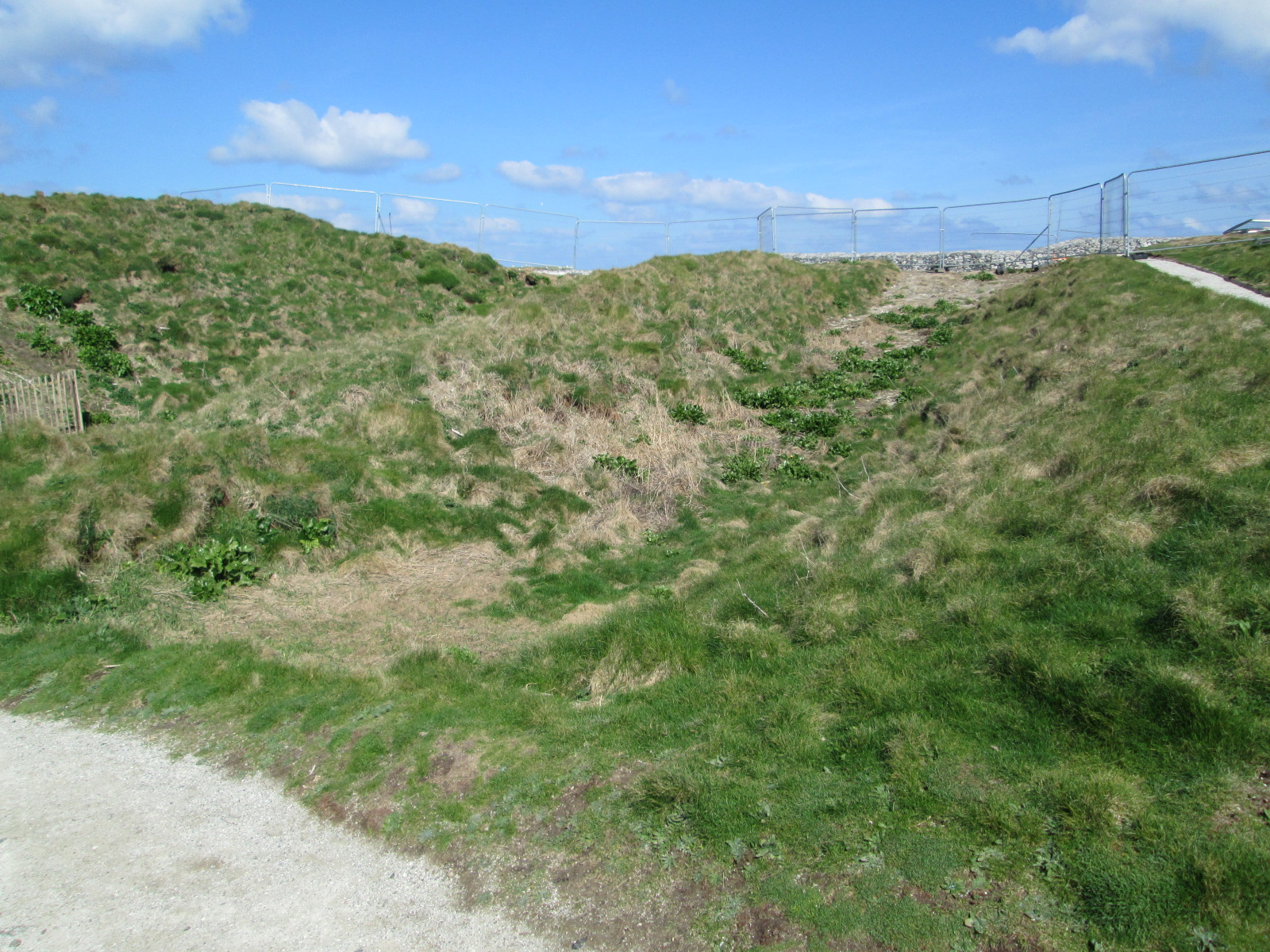
The ramparts (seen from the south) immediately east of the gap in the peninsula

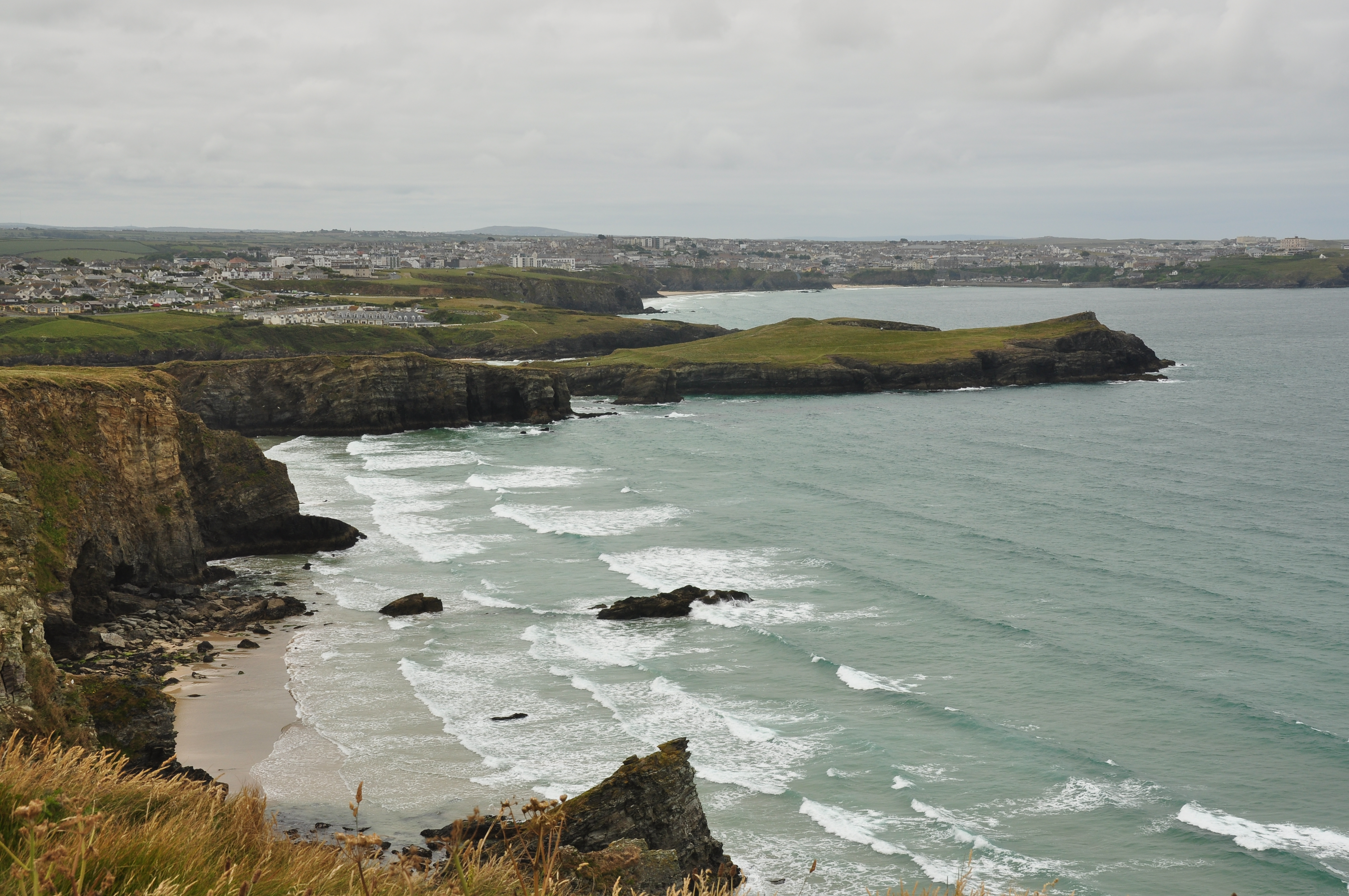
Trevelgue Head seen from the north

The peninsula is connected to the mainland at the eastern end; on the south (present-day Porth) is a natural harbour. The South West Coast Path traces the perimeter of the eastern part of the peninsula.

On the east side there are defensive earthworks. There is a single bank and ditch on the wider part of the peninsula near the mainland. The wide enclosure between this and the ramparts further west is protected by sea-cliffs on the northern side; on the south side there is a smaller drop to the sea, once protected by an extension of the outer rampart.

There is a gap in the peninsula, crossed by a modern bridge where there may have been originally a land-bridge; immediately before this there are three massive banks and ditches. Beyond the gap and adjacent to it is a rampart, and a final rampart further west.

There are two early Bronze Age round barrows within the defences: a barrow in the eastern enclosure near the cliffs, 18 metres (59 ft) in diameter and 1.6 metres (5.2 ft) high; and a barrow at the summit of the peninsula, near the western end, 25 metres (82 ft) in diameter and 2.5 metres (8.2 ft) high.

== Excavation ==
There was an archaeological excavation of the site in 1939 by C. K. Croft Andrew; the project was abandoned on the outbreak of war and the findings were not published. In 1997 the principle discoveries were analysed, and in 2011 the Cornwall Archaeological Unit published Trevelgue Head, Cornwall: the importance of CK Croft Andrew’s 1939 excavations for prehistoric and Roman Cornwall.

== Finds from excavation ==
There was evidence that the site was occupied from the Mesolithic period, but most of the remains relate to the Iron Age.

There are foundations of Iron Age roundhouses, of the 2nd century BC. The largest was 14.5 metres (48 ft) in diameter: there are remains of a ring of seven or eight postholes and a central hearth. The building, one of the largest such roundhouses found in Cornwall, may have been a meeting place, rather than a dwelling.

There is evidence of bronze and iron smelting: furnaces, ore roasting pits and 200 kg of iron slag were found. About 600 items of worked stone, over 4,000 shards of pottery, and objects of tin, copper and iron and glass were found.
