= Lusty Glaze =

Beach in Newquay, Cornwall, England

Coordinates: 50.422°N 5.064°W

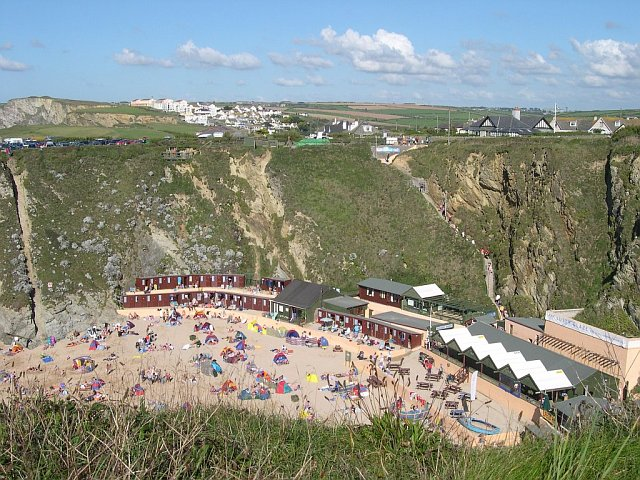
The beach and cliffs

Lusty Glaze (Cornish: Plustri Glas, meaning green grazing area) also known as Lusty Glaze Beach, is a beach in Newquay, Cornwall.

Lusty Glaze is privately owned, notably to the low watermark. For much of the year, the beach is open, free of charge to the public. The only access to the beach is via 133 steps.

For many years the current owner operated the UK's first dedicated Rescue Training Centre and Outdoor Activity Centre. Today, Lusty Glaze hosts a wide variety of weddings and events, offers accommodation in the original beach cottage, constructed in 1921 and a range of beach cabins or pods. The cove is naturally sheltered by high cliffs.

Lusty Glaze is home to a thriving Surf Lifesaving club.

It was the southern terminus of the abortive St Columb Canal, parts of which were built in the 1770s, and although the southern section was probably never used, the remains of the inclined plane that connected the beach to the canal on the cliff top 100 feet (30 m) above are still clearly visible.
