= Jean Tangye =

- Born: Jean Everald Nicol; 23 March 1919; Brentford, Hertfordshire, England
- Died: 22 February 1986 (aged 66); St Ives, Cornwall, England
- Occupations: Writer; Illustrator; Painter
- Spouse: Derek Tangye

Jean Everald Tangye (née Nicol; 23 March 1919 – 22 February 1986) was a British author, illustrator and painter, who lived on a small holding near Lamorna Cove, west Cornwall in the United Kingdom. She was married to the writer Derek Tangye and appeared in (and illustrated) The Minack Chronicles, a series of books of their life together.

== Personal life ==
Jean Nicol started work at the Savoy Hotel, London on 27 April 1939. She first met Derek Tangye in 1941 when he asked her to stock his book, Time Was Mine in the hotel book stall. They became engaged in the winter of 1942 and married 20 February 1943. The couple lived at Cholmondley House before moving to Thames Bank Cottage on the banks of the River Thames at Mortlake. Jeannie met many famous actors and actresses, including Danny Kaye, James Mason, Charlie Chaplin and Gertrude Lawrence as well as politicians and eminent world leaders during her time at the Savoy group of hotels. Many of these remained friends with Derek and Jeannie when they moved to Cornwall including, for example, the politician George Brown. Jeannie and Derek Tangye left London in 1949 and moved to Cornwall to live at Dorminack, a small holding on the cliffs in the parish of St Buryan.

== Published books ==
Her first book published 1952 Meet me at the Savoy with several reprints (final reprint 1962 ) was her autobiography about the time she worked at the Savoy group of hotels. Her other books were fictional accounts based on her career at the Savoy.

- 1952 Meet me at the Savoy, published by Museum Press, London
- 1962 Hotel Regina
- 1976 Home is the Hotel
- 1983 Bertioni's Hotel, published by Michael Joseph Ltd ISBN 0718122186
