= Nigel Tangye =

British writer

- Born: Nigel Trevithick Tangye; 24 April 1909; Kensington, London, England
- Died: 2 June 1988 (aged 79); Camborne, Cornwall, England
- Education: Royal Naval College
- Spouse(s): Moira Flavin; Ann Todd (1945–49); Lady Marguerite Tangye (1951–64)
- Children: Antonia Tangye; Gerran Trevithick Tangye; Charles Trevithick Tangye; Henry [Harry] Trevithick Tangye
- Relatives: Derek Tangye (brother); Richard Tangye (grandfather)

Nigel Trevithick Tangye (24 April 1909 – 2 June 1988) was a British airman, novelist, journalist and the writer of various books about Cornwall. He worked for MI5, and later claimed to have been an MI5 agent during the Spanish Civil War.

== Family ==
He was the brother of the writer Derek Tangye. Their father was Richard Trevithick Gilbertstone Tangye, in turn the son of the engineer Richard Tangye. He was married to the actress Ann Todd.

== Career ==
Born in Kensington, Nigel Tangye started his career in the Royal Navy, spending three years in the Mediterranean having graduated at the Royal Naval College in Dartmouth. He then left the Navy and devoted himself to learning to fly. He soon earned a Professional Pilot's 'B' Licence, the Navigator's Licence and the Air Ministry Instructor's Licence. After that he performed aerobatic demonstrations and worked as a flying instructor at the London Aeroplane Club.

As the aviation correspondent for the London Evening News, Tangye covered the Spanish Civil War. His 1937 account of the war, Red, White and Spain, provided a strongly pro-Nationalist viewpoint. However, Tangye later recorded that it had been ″written by the author as a cover to his assignment by MI5 as a secret agent in the Spanish War″ seeking information on German military involvement. There is independent evidence that he worked in MI5’s press department, later acting briefly as its director.

In 1938 he wrote Teach Yourself to Fly, a book designed to help flying students with the basics before entering an aeroplane. The book - the first of the Teach Yourself series - was sufficiently well-regarded that it became recommended by the British Air Ministry for pilots in the run up to and during the Second World War, and Tangye was asked to train prospective RAF pilots. In later life he became a hotelier at Newquay. In later years he lived in Cornwall and died in Camborne, aged 79.

There is a portrait of Tangye at the Tate gallery, that was painted by Wyndham Lewis in 1945.

== Selected works ==
- 1935: The Air is our Concern: a critical study of England's future in aviation. London: Methuen (as editor)
- 1937: Contributions as Air Correspondent for the Evening News (from 1937)
- 1937: Red, White and Spain. London : Rich & Cowan (an account of a visit during the civil war)
- 1941: Teach Yourself To Fly; by Squadron Leader Nigel Tangye, R.A.F.O. (1941) (Reprinted by Hodder, 2008; ISBN 978-0-340-96614-3)
- 1944: Britain in the Air. London: William Collins
  - 1947: --do.-- in: British Adventure. London: William Collins (by six authors; ed. W. J. Turner; introd. by N. Tangye)
- 1959: The House on the Seine and Other Stories. Newquay: Eric Hale
- 1962: The Story of Glendorgal: a personal view. Truro: D. Bradford Barton
  - 1984: --do.-- 3rd ed. Redruth: Dyllansow Truran
- 1974: Facing the Sea: a Cornishman remembers. London: William Kimber ISBN 0718303237 (autobiography)
- 1976: The Inconstant Sea: a Cornishman's chronicle. London: William Kimber ISBN 0-7183-0274-5
- 1977: From Rock and Tempest. London: William Kimber ISBN 0718303156 (about shipwrecks round the Lizard peninsula)
- 1978: Voyage into Cornwall's Past. London: William Kimber ISBN 071830196X (in the ketch Spray)
- 1980: Cornwall Newspapers, 18th & 19th Century: gazetteer & finding list. 20 pp. Truro: Trevithick Society and Institute of Cornish Studies; 1 December 1980 ISBN 0904040127.
- 1980: The Living Breath of Cornwall. London: William Kimber ISBN 0718300084 (a voyage in the ketch Spray)
- 1981: Cornwall and the Tumbling Sea. London: William Kimber ISBN 0718302583
- 1981: A Girl, a Boy and a Gannet: a Tale of the Cornish Coast; illustrations by Margot Maeckelberghe. Padstow: Lodenek Press ISBN 0-902899-93-7
- 1982: Proud Seas and Cornwall's Past. London: William Kimber ISBN 0718300793
- 1986: The Blue Bays of Cornwall. London: William Kimber ISBN 0-7183-0595-7

== Films ==
- 1936: Things to Come (aeronautical advisor)
- 1940: Conquest of the Air (technical advisor, associate producer)
- 1948: Daybreak (composer, song "Daybreak"; score published and held by the British Library)
