= Derek Tangye =

British author

- Born: Derek Alan Trevithick Tangye; 29 February 1912
- Died: 26 October 1996 (aged 84)
- Spouse: Jeannie
- Relatives: Nigel Tangye (brother); Colin Tangye (brother); Richard Tangye (grandfather)

Derek Alan Trevithick Tangye (29 February 1912 – 26 October 1996) was a British author who lived in Cornwall for nearly fifty years.

== Early life ==
The youngest son of Richard Trevithick Gilbertstone Tangye, and the grandson of the engineer Richard Tangye, he had two older brothers, Nigel Tangye, also an author and Lt Col. Richard Colin Trevithick Tangye, a Lloyds Underwriter and later a Lieutenant Colonel in the Intelligence Corps.

Tangye was educated at Copthorne School.

== Life and work ==
Tangye's first career was as a newspaper columnist, and during the Second World War he worked for MI5. He married Jean Everald Nicol, a hotel PR executive, and soon after the war they moved to Cornwall to live in a remote cottage surrounded by animals, which featured in nearly all of Tangye's works. He wrote nineteen books, which became known as The Minack Chronicles, about his simple life on a clifftop daffodil farm called Dorminack, affectionately referred to as Minack, at St Buryan in the far west of Cornwall. The first of The Minack Chronicles was A Gull on the Roof, published in 1961. This was followed by a new book almost every two years. The Way to Minack, the sixth book in the series details the path they took to be at Minack, while a Cottage on a Cliff gives an account of the author's time with MI5.

Derek Tangye was not originally fond of cats and was introduced to Monty, a ginger tom kitten, which was given to Jeannie at the Savoy Hotel. Derek told their housekeeper it should live in the kitchen, but Monty eventually ended up sleeping on their bed. Monty (named after General Montgomery) moved with Derek and Jeannie to Minack where he leapt across the small stream that crosses the path to the cottage. Derek dedicated one of his books (A Cat in the Window) to Monty. Later he wrote a book entitled Monty's Leap.

Jeannie, after whom one of his books was named, died in February 1986 and Derek lived on in the cottage for another ten years, dying at the age of 84 on 26 October 1996. He was in the process of writing Shadows just before his death. The thriller writer John le Carré, who lived a mile away along the cliff path, gave the eulogy at his funeral.

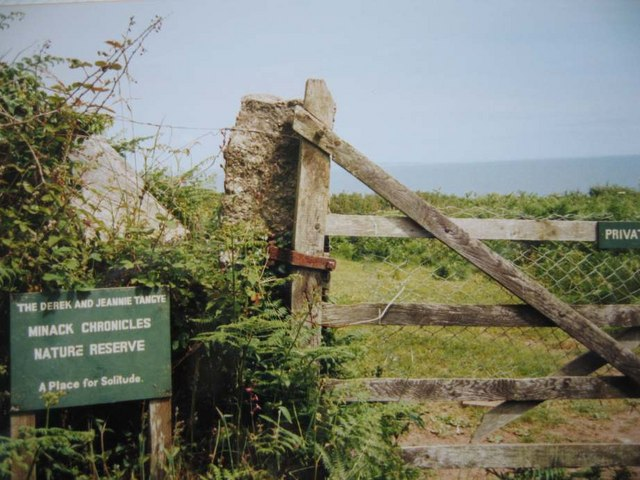
A sign for "Minack Chronicles Nature Reserve"

Towards the end of their lives, the Tangyes bought the fields next to their cottage which are now preserved as a nature reserve. 'The Derek and Jeannie Tangye Minack Chronicles Nature Trust' was set up, in accordance with Derek's wishes, a year after his death and the Trustees manage the 18 acres. It was called Oliver Land after the cat Oliver was seen hunting there before he joined them at Minack. It is a 'Place for Solitude' and quiet contemplation. It is ultimately a place for the wildlife, flora and fauna that reside there. The nature reserve was managed by a small group of trustees selected by Derek with the intention that at some point in the future they would hand over the reins to the charity organisation he had chosen Cornwall Wildlife Trust. In 2018 the CWT took over management and maintenance of Oliver Land.

Tangye was reluctant to describe himself as a writer, but his simple literary style had appeal for a wide range of people who yearned to escape urban and suburban drudgery. His books described the couple's life growing potatoes and flowers (predominantly daffodils) on a cliff top smallholding in far west Cornwall. The donkeys and cats on their tiny farm all became "characters" in his books, and fans made a 'pilgrimage' from around the world, all eager to share – if only for a few hours – their rustic dream. Invariably, Derek and Jeannie would uncork a bottle of wine and entertain visitors in their small, glazed cottage porch, where he was happy to regale them with tales of life at Minack and on occasion discuss matters of politics, environment and society in general!

== Published books ==
Omnibus volumes and anthologies are not included below. The majority of his books were published by Michael Joseph Ltd

- 1941: Time Was Mine. London: Hutchinson [He spent time in a cottage in Cornwall writing this book before he was called back to London to join the Army]
- 1942: Went the Day Well; edited by Derek Tangye with contributions from many writers. London: Harrap
  - --do.--(Reissued in 1995 by Michael Joseph, with subtitle: "tributes to men and women who died for freedom when Britain stood alone in the first two years of the Second World War".)
- 1944: One King: a survey of the dominions and colonies of the British empire. London: Harrap
- 1961: A Gull on the Roof. London: Michael Joseph
- 1962: A Cat in the Window. London: Michael Joseph (American ed. has title: Monty: biography of a marmalade cat.)
- 1963: A Drake at the Door. London: Michael Joseph
- 1965: A Donkey in the Meadow. London: Michael Joseph
- 1966: Lama. London: Michael Joseph
- 1968: The Way to Minack. London: Michael Joseph ISBN 0-7221-8366-6
- 1970: A Cornish Summer London: Michael Joseph ISBN 0-7181-0041-7
- 1972: Cottage on a Cliff. London: Michael Joseph
- 1974: A Cat Affair London: Michael Joseph ISBN 0-7181-1287-3
- 1976; Somewhere a Cat is Waiting. Delacorte Press 1976
- 1976: Sun on the Lintel. London: Michael Joseph
- 1978: The Winding Lane. London: Michael Joseph ISBN 0-7221-8392-5
- 1980: When the Winds Blow. London: Michael Joseph
- 1982: The Ambrose Rock. London: Michael Joseph
- 1984: A Quiet Year. London: Michael Joseph
- 1987: The Cherry Tree London: Michael Joseph
- 1988: Jeannie: a love story. London: Michael Joseph
- 1990: The Evening Gull. London: Michael Joseph
- 1993: Monty's Leap. London: Michael Joseph
- 1996: The Confusion Room. London: Michael Joseph
