= Richard Tangye =

British mechanical engineer

Sir Richard Tangye
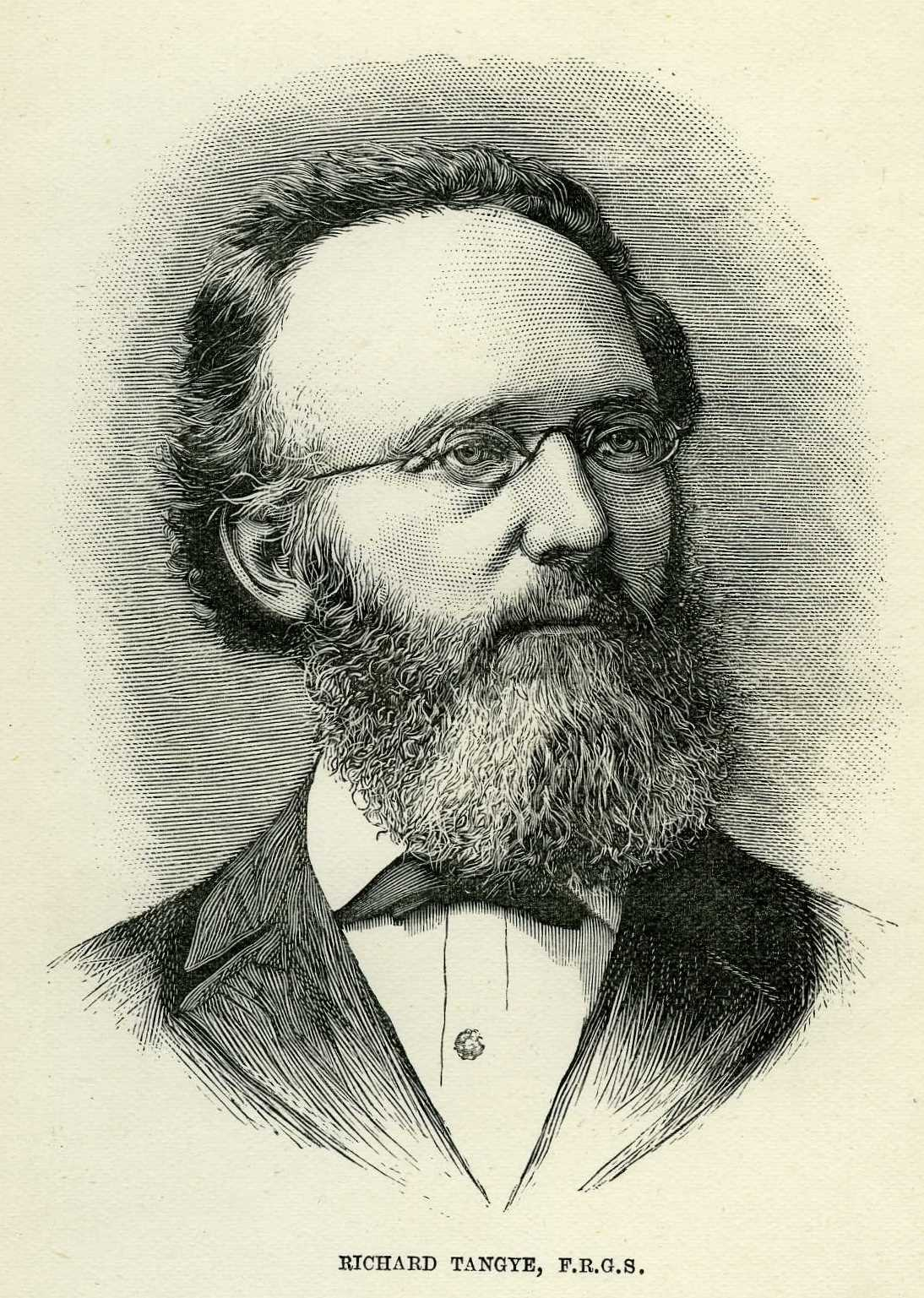
- By Frank Hewett
- Born: 24 November 1833; Illogan, Cornwall, England
- Died: 14 October 1906 (aged 72)
- Education: Sidcot School
- Engineering career
- Discipline: Mechanical engineer
- Projects: SS Great Eastern; Saltburn Cliff Lift

Sir Richard Trevithick Tangye(24 November 1833 – 14 October 1906) was a British manufacturer of engines and other heavy equipment.

== Biography ==
Richard Tangye was born at Illogan, near Redruth, Cornwall, the fifth son in a family of six sons and three daughters of Joseph Tangye (1798-1854), a Quaker miner of Redruth, later a small shopkeeper and farmer, and Ann, née Bullock. As a young boy he worked in the fields, but when he was eight years old he was incapacitated from further manual labour by a fracture of the right arm. His father then determined to give him the best education he could afford, and young Tangye was sent to the Quaker Sidcot School in the Mendip Hills near the village of Winscombe, Somerset, where he progressed rapidly and became a pupil-teacher.

=== Career ===
Tangye disliked this role, and through an advertisement in The Friend obtained a clerkship in a small engineering firm in Birmingham, where two of his brothers, skilled mechanics, subsequently joined him. Here Richard Tangye remained four years, obtaining a complete mastery of the details of an engineering business, and introducing the system of a Saturday half-holiday which he had supported on its introduction by John Frearson, the radical Birmingham Engineer. It was subsequently adopted in many English industrial works.

=== Tangye Ltd ===
In 1856, Tangye started business in a small way in Birmingham as a hardware factor and commission agent. His first customers were the Cornish mine-owners in the Redruth district.

In March 1857, Richard Tangye, with brothers James and Joseph, started a manufacturing business in Mount Street under the title of James Tangye and Bros. Principally manufacturing hydraulic appliances and particularly lifting jacks, on 31 January 1858, their jacks were successfully employed in the launching of Brunel's steamship SS Great Eastern. Tangye said of the project:

We launched the Great Eastern and she launched us

In 1859, brothers Edward and George joined, together with George Price. The company acquired the patent of the differential pulley-block in 1861, and in 1862 James Tangye invented the Tangye Patent Hydraulic Jack. This resulted in the 1862 purchase and demolition of Soho-located Smethwick Hall, on the site of which was built the Cornwall Works. In 1867 the patent for a new type of Direct-acting Steam Pump was acquired, and in 1870 the company commenced the manufacture of steam engines.

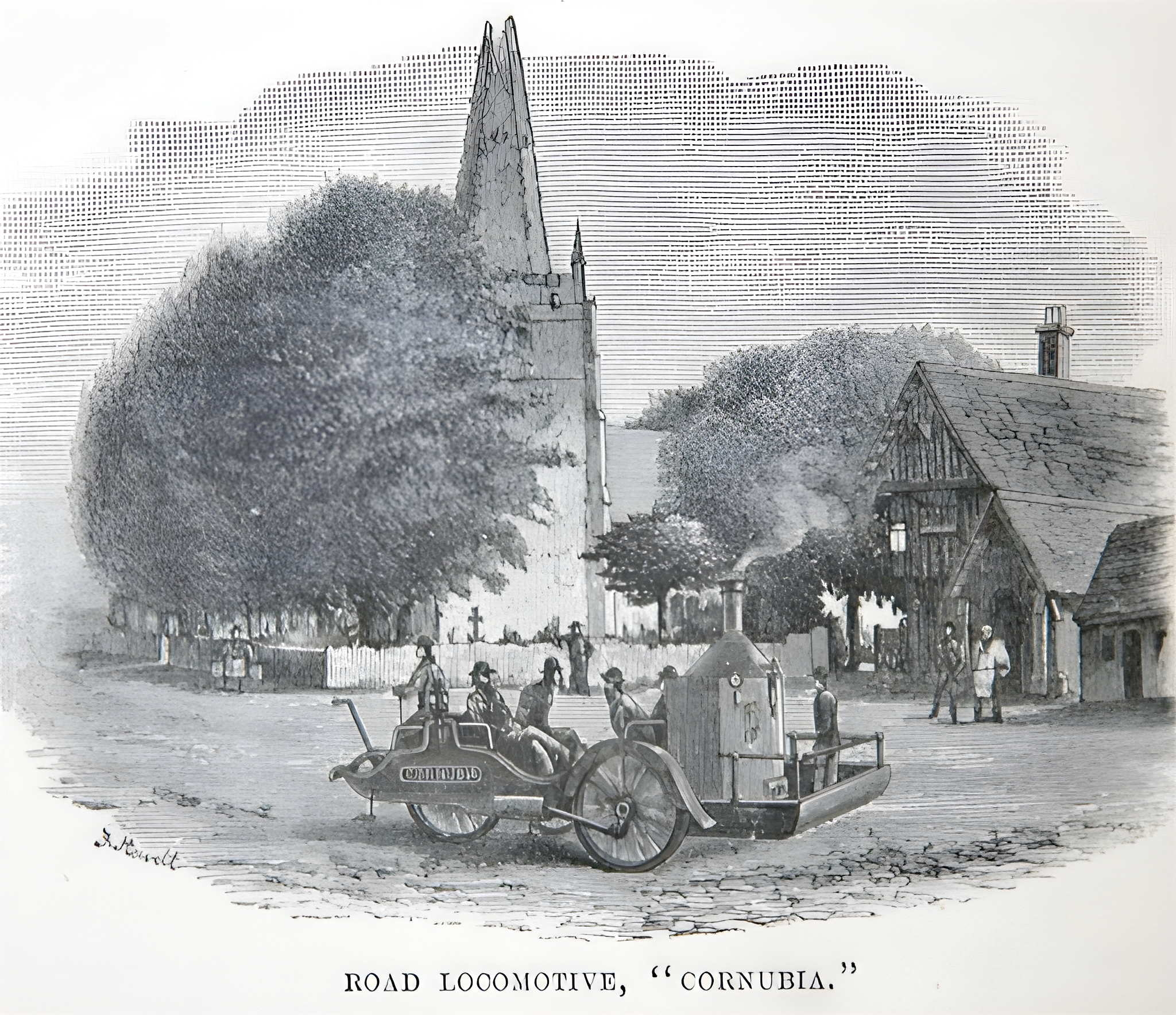
Cornubia prototype steam carriage

Richard Tangye demonstrated Cornubia, a prototype steam road locomotive, in 1862. It was a passenger vehicle with a capacity of ten persons, including three operators: at the front a driver, who controlled the regulator, reverser and brake, and rider , who steered, with the fireman on a platform at the back. The vehicle weighed 27 hundredweight (1,400 kg) with a maximum speed of 20 miles per hour (32 km/h). Tangye's intention was that it should act as a "feeder" to railways where traffic was thought too sparse to justify the expense of building a line. It performed well, but in 1865 legislation was passed in the UK Parliament to restrict its use: the Locomotives Act 1865 (the "Red Flag Act") limited speed to 4 mph and required a man with a red flag to precede the vehicle on any public road.

The company was commissioned to design the hydraulic systems for the UK's first funicular cliff railway in Scarborough, North Yorkshire, in 1869. After completing another in Scarborough, they employed George Croydon Marks as head of lifts, in which capacity he designed the 1883 Saltburn Cliff Lift, which today is the oldest water-powered cliff railway in the United Kingdom.

In 1872, the two youngest brothers, Richard and George, became sole proprietors. They developed the company internationally, opening offices in Johannesburg and Sydney. The first gas engine, a 1 nominal horsepower two-cycle type, was sold in 1881, and in 1890 the firm commenced manufacture of the four-cycle gas engine. Incorporated as a limited company from 1881, in 1894 they produced their first hot bulb engine. Richard Tangye was knighted in 1894.

Tangye travelled extensively, visiting Australia more than once and also New Zealand and America. He sought to restore his health on the ocean voyages but his main purpose in going to these countries was to expand his business. His accounts of his travels reveal a man who was annoyed that he was not shown the deference by hotel employees that he enjoyed in Britain and who was often unimpressed by the food he was presented with (excluding the fruit, which he greatly liked) - but who enjoyed being recognised and was pleased when he saw evidence of progress e.g. in the establishment of libraries.

=== Philanthropy ===
Richard Tangye and his brother George were founding benefactors of Birmingham Museum & Art Gallery in 1885, which today has a collection of international importance covering fine art, ceramics, metalwork, jewellery, archaeology, ethnography, local history and industrial history. They also helped found Birmingham School of Art.

Tangye was a noted collector of Oliver Cromwell manuscripts and memorabilia. His collection included many rare manuscripts and printed books, medals, paintings, objets d'art and a bizarre assemblage of 'relics'. The 'relics' included Cromwell's Bible, button, coffin plate, death mask and funeral escutcheon. On Tangye's death, the entire collection was donated to the Museum of London, where it can still be seen today. Items from the Tangye Collection are also to be found at the Cromwell Museum.

=== Personal life ===
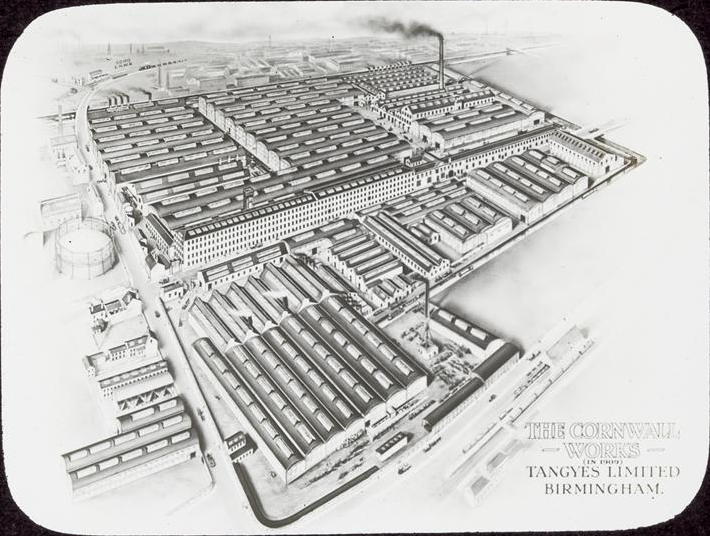
Aerial View of Cornwall Works, circa 1909.

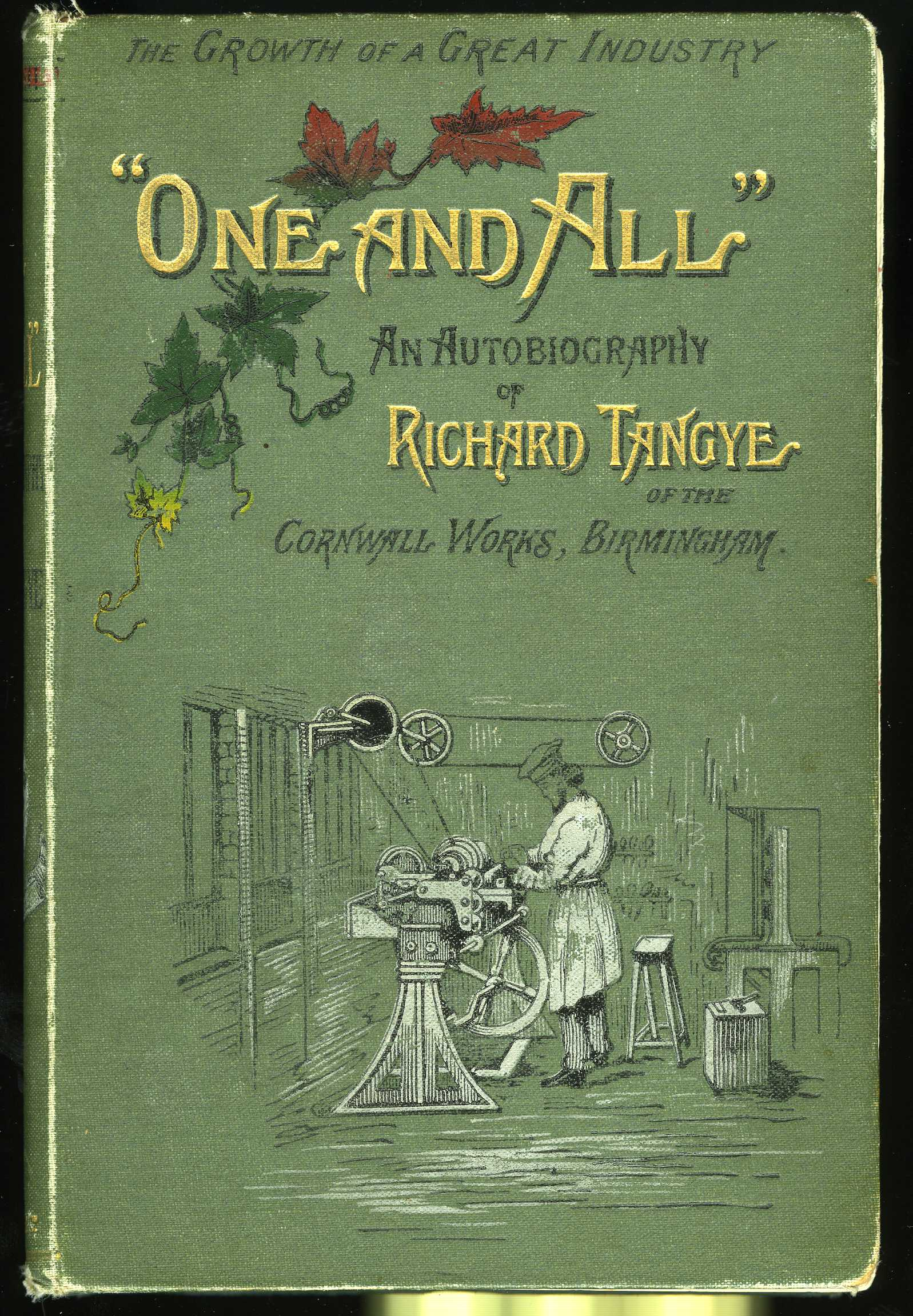
The cover of Tangye's autobiography "One and All"

Tangye was under five feet tall, short even by the standards of the time. Married, Tangye lived in Birmingham, and latterly London, but often returned to his cliff-edge house in Newquay, Cornwall. Richard Tangye has been described by his biographer as a man of great resolve with considerable talents for promoting his business, but also very much valuing his privacy and never wishing to hold public office in Birmingham. (Stephen Roberts, 'Sir Richard Tangye 1833-1906: A Cornish Entrepreneur in Victorian Birmingham, 2015). He was the grandfather of the authors Derek Tangye and Nigel Tangye. Through his niece Helena Tangye Lean, he was a great-uncle of film maker David Lean and his brother Edward Tangye Lean, founder of the Inklings.

== After death ==
After the deaths of Richard (1906) and George (1920), with the family owning the majority of shares, their sons entered the business. In 1919, the company started production of large-scale industrial diesel engines, pumps and hydraulic equipment. Engine production was stopped after World War II, with the company concentrating on hydraulic pumps, valves and related systems.

== Publications ==
Tangye wrote an autobiography, One and All (1889). The only modern study is Sir Richard Tangye 1833-1914: A Cornish Entrepreneur in Victorian Birmingham (2015) by Stephen Roberts.

== Examples of Tangye engines ==
The various engines had an elegance as well as being functional. Here are some examples in various museums.

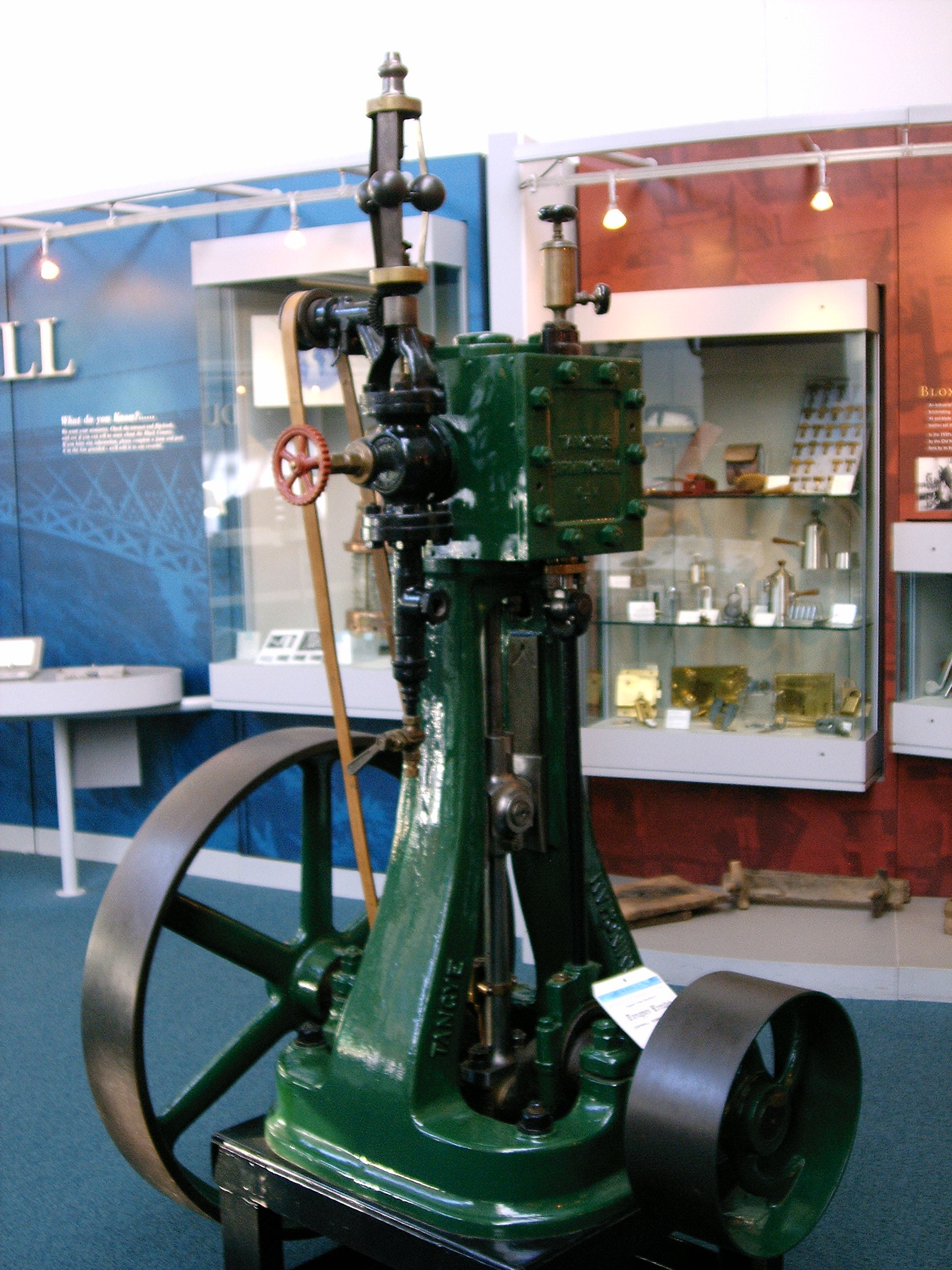
Tangye vertical engine on display at the Black Country Living Museum.

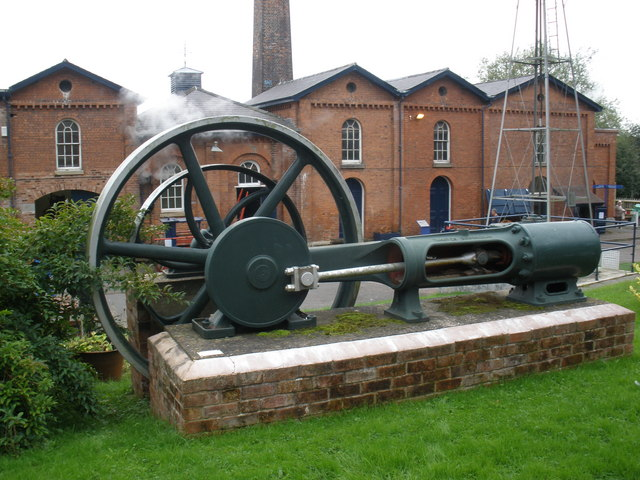
Tangye single-cylinder horizontal steam engine from 1890, at Broomy Hill Waterworks Museum.
