= Headland Hotel =

Hotel in Newquay, Cornwall, England

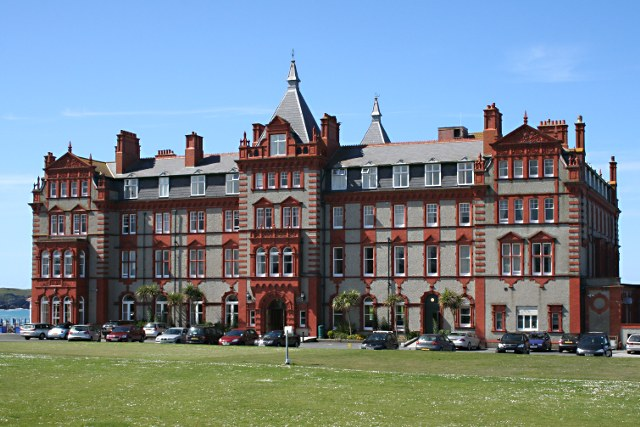

- Location within Cornwall
- Alternative names: The Headland

General information
- Status: Grade II listed
- Architectural style: Victorian
- Location: Newquay, Cornwall, England, Fistral Beach, Headland Road, Newquay TR7 1EW, Newquay
- Coordinates: 50°25′14″N 5°5′49″W
- Construction started: August 1897
- Completed: 1900
- Opened: June 1900

Height
- Roof: Mansard Style Roof

Technical details
- Floor count: 4

Design and construction
- Architect: Silvanus Trevail
- Main contractor: Arthur Carkeek of Redruth

Other information
- Number of rooms: 95
- Number of restaurants: 3

Website
- Headland Hotel

Listed Building – Grade II
- Official name: The Headland Hotel
- Designated: 12 May 1988
- Reference no.: 1327390

The Headland Hotel is a Grade II listed building located in Newquay, Cornwall, England, United Kingdom. It was opened in June 1900 and is built on a prominent position overlooking Fistral Beach and Towan Head.

== History ==
Silvanus Trevail's Great Western Hotel at Newquay, completed in 1879, was the first in a string of hotels designed to appeal to renewed interest in Cornwall as a winter resort for the middle classes. Trevail's Cornish Hotels Company was formed in 1890.

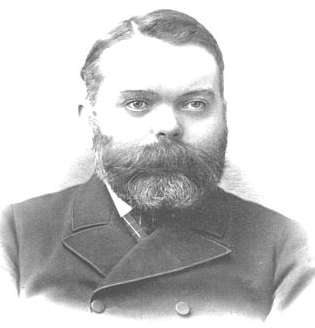
Silvanus Trevail

The company's Atlantic Hotel was built in 1892 following which Trevail intended to build an upmarket estate, with another luxury hotel, on the headlands of Newquay but lack of money hampered his plans. This scheme provoked a lot of opposition from the local people of Newquay. When building finally began on the Headland Hotel in 1897, riots broke out in the town as it threatened the local custom of using the clifftop as grazing land and space to dry fishermen's nets. This, together with planning problems, delayed completion until June 1900, by which time a rival hotel, the Victoria, which had started construction later, was already open. The contractor for the Headland was Arthur Carkeek of Redruth with the terracotta coming from Ruabon, North Wales. James Shoolbred & Co of London supplied most of the furniture.

Trevail suggested the hotel would be 'The largest hotel in the west', twice the size of the Atlantic hotel and in a better position. The building was lavishly decorated with red Rueben terracotta columns and pediments. It had an electric lift and electric lighting in all 120 rooms. Originally the cost of building the hotel was estimated at £25,000 including £4,000's worth of terracotta, but Trevail installed luxurious furnishings from Heal's of London, expensive kitchen equipment, a tennis court and 4 croquet lawns. The eventual cost was £50,000 all together.

The hotel received its first guests in June 1900. It is, according to Nikolaus Pevsner, "decidedly disappointing, Victorian, yellow and red brick, tall and symmetrical, pavilion roofs and no redeeming features". It is one of the few hotels in Newquay to retain its original appearance.

In 1911, Edward, Prince of Wales, and his brother Prince Albert (later Kings Edward VIII and George VI respectively) recuperated at the hotel after catching measles and mumps while studying at Royal Naval College, Dartmouth.

During World War II the hotel was requisitioned as an RAF hospital, as were many other hotels in Newquay.

The 1990 film adaptation of Roald Dahl's novel The Witches was shot here, and was called "Hotel Excelsior" in the film.

=== 21st-century ===
During the UK lockdown, the ocean-facing side of the building was covered in scaffolding as builders replaced many of the wooden windowsills, restored the four sunset view balconies, and carried out essential repairs to the rest of the exterior, as part of a £55,000 conservation programme.
