= Temple Church (disambiguation) =

The Temple Church is a 12th-century church in London, England, built by the Knights Templar.

Temple Church may also refer to:

- Temple Church, Bristol, a ruined church in Bristol, England, built by the Knights Templar
- Temple Church, Cornwall, the parish church of the village of Temple, Cornwall, also built by the Knights Templar
- City Temple, London, a Nonconformist church on Holborn Viaduct in London
