= The Nici, Newquay =

Hotel in Newquay, Cornwall, England

The Nici
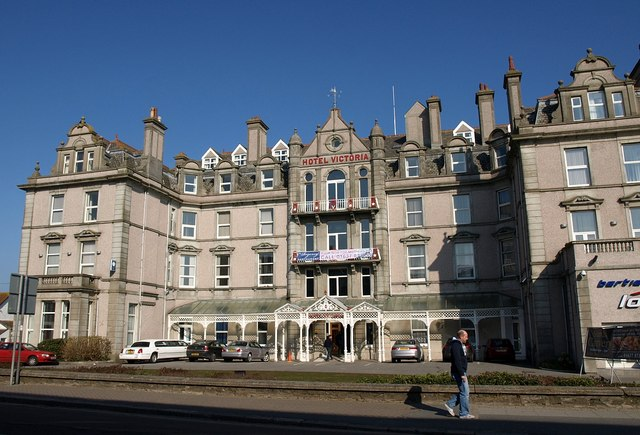
- The Hotel in 2009

- Location within Cornwall
- Former names: Hotel Victoria (1899 - 2024)
- Hotel chain: Legacy Hotels & Resorts (until 2024); THE NICI (2024 - Present)

General information
- Architectural style: Victorian Gothic
- Location: Newquay, Cornwall
- Coordinates: 50°24′52″N 5°04′43″W
- Construction started: 1897
- Completed: 1899
- Opened: 1 June 1899
- Renovated: 2025-26

Technical details
- Floor count: 4

Design and construction
- Architect: John Sansom

Other information
- Number of rooms: 82
- Number of restaurants: 1
- Facilities: Swimming Pool & Spa

Website
- THE NICI, Newquay

Locally Listed Building
- Official name: The Hotel Victoria
- Country: United Kingdom
- Authority: Cornwall Council

The Nici, formerly known as the Hotel Victoria, is in Newquay, Cornwall, United Kingdom and is near the cliffs above the Great Western Beach. The hotel first opened in June 1899.

== History ==
In the years prior to 1897 local councillors envisaged development opportunities of building a grand hotel. They formed The Victoria Hotel Company Limited in 1897.

The hotel was designed by the Cornish architect, John Sansom, who was part of a practice in Liskeard. He was responsible for designing a number of works in Cornwall, mostly around Liskeard, the Porthminster Hotel in St. Ives, and various schools and churches.

Construction of the hotel, by local builder C.R Bellingham, started in 1897 and was completed by May 1899, more than a year before the Headland Hotel, by rival architect Sylvanus Trevail. The hotel officially opened on 1 June 1899.

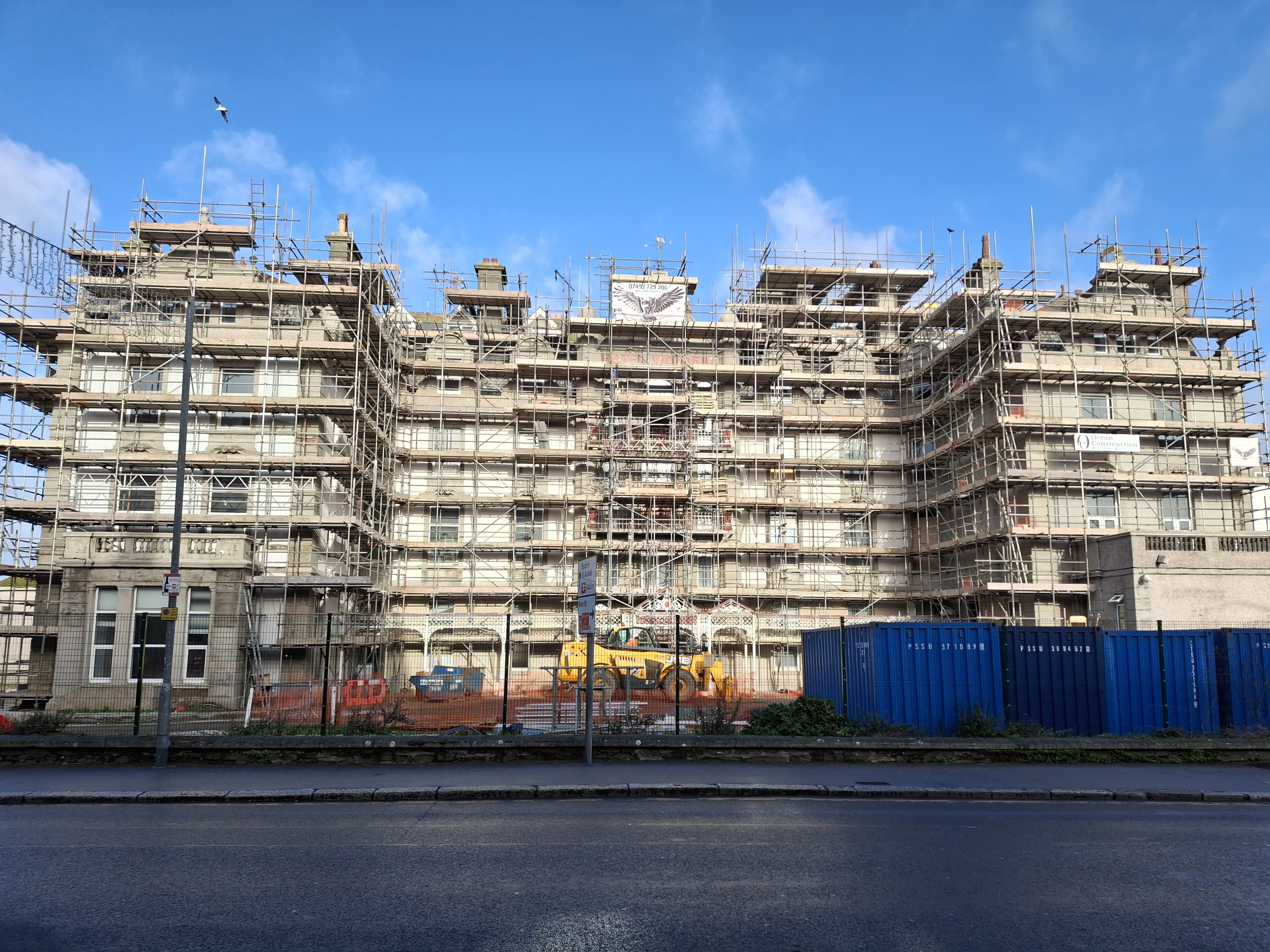
The Hotel being renovated (2025)

The Hotel Victoria was built in the Gothic Revival Style, with ornate stonework, Victorian style balconies and a glass covered entrance cloister. The hotel was heated by Spencer's patent radiators.

In the Second World War it was one of a number of hotels in Newquay that were requisitioned by the military as a convalescent hospital.

When originally built the hotel accommodated 100 guests and their servants in suites of apartments. In later years it has been reorganised and enlarged and now caters for more than 200 guests. A feature of the Victoria was the lift that connected every floor to the bathing beaches below, claimed to be the only one in England.

The hotel closed in November 2024 after being sold to new owners. The sale included Bertie O'Flannigan's pub, Berties nightclub, and other nearby properties. The closure led to 60 staff redundancies, though the new owner plans to renovate and continue operating the hotel.

In January 2026, plans were submitted to redevelop the rest of the site into apartments.

The hotel was renamed The Nici and reopened on the 15th June 2026.
