= Brownqueen Tunnel =

Railway tunnel in England

- Interactive map of Brownqueen Tunnel

Overview
- Other name: Brown Queen Tunnel
- Location: Cornwall, England
- Coordinates: North Portal: 50.434958°N 4.680927°W; South Portal: 50.43422°N 4.680884°W
- Status: Active

Operation
- Opened: 4 May 1859
- Operator: Cornish Main Line
- Character: Through-rail passenger and freight.

Technical
- No. of tracks: 2 single track
- Track gauge: 1,435 mm (4 ft 8 1/2 in) (standard gauge)

Brownqueen Tunnel, also called Brown Queen Tunnel, is a railway tunnel on the Cornish Main Line between Lostwithiel and Bodmin Parkway stations in Cornwall, England.

== Location ==
The tunnel is aligned approximately north-south and is on a left-hand curve and a falling gradient when travelling in the down direction. The tunnel itself is 264 feet (80 m) long although one source gives the length as 237 feet (72 m) and the up portal is 278 miles 16 chains from London according to the mileposts. Situated just above the River Fowey, Brownqueen Tunnel is in the same area as "Brownqueen Wood", a small forested area of about 6.08 hectares (15.0 acres).

South of the tunnel, trains pass Restormel Castle, one of the four chief Norman castles of Cornwall. To the north of the tunnel are the historic Glynn House and Bodmin Parkway station.

== Construction ==
The tunnel opened on 4 May 1859, when the Cornwall Railway opened between Plymouth and Truro, and is still in use today.

This is one of five tunnels on the Cornwall Railway, all of which are lined with masonry and topped by brickwork at the crown of the arch. This tunnel passes through 216 feet (66 m) of hard greenstone which the builders were able to drill and blast through using nine tons of powder (because dynamite had not yet been invented).

== Suicide of Silvanus Trevail ==
On 7 November 1903, the architect Silvanus Trevail committed suicide in the toilet of a train in the tunnel. Trevail caught the 11.40 up train from Truro, having purchased a third class ticket, a peculiar event as he typically travelled first class. At Par railway station he was witnessed leaving his seat and going to the toilet. As the train entered the Brownqueen tunnel, Trevail shot himself; when the train stopped at Bodmin Road, a porter was called, and Trevail’s body was found lying across the toilet.

== Etymology ==
The name "Brownqueen", which applies to both the tunnel and the forest around it, is a modern corruption of the old Cornish term "Brow Gwyn", meaning "white mound". It is also spelled "brownquin", and can be translated as "white hill".
