= Carbis Bay Hotel =

Hotel in Carbis Bay, Cornwall, England

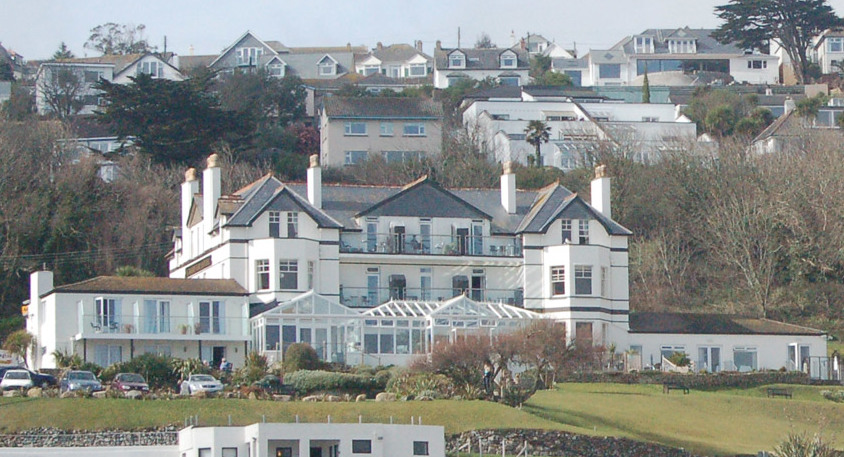
- Hotel building viewed from the beach (2010)

- Location in Cornwall

General information
- Location: Carbis Bay, Cornwall
- Coordinates: 50°11′53″N 5°28′0″W
- Opening: 1894
- Owner: Stephen Baker

Design and construction
- Architect: Silvanus Trevail

Other information
- Number of rooms: 47

Carbis Bay Hotel is a hotel in Carbis Bay near St Ives, Cornwall. It is the most prominent building in Carbis Bay, overlooking the beach.

== History ==
It was built in 1894 by Silvanus Trevail, Cornwall's most notable architect of the 19th century. As of 2003, the hotel was owned by Stephen Baker and his family, although it was previously owned by the Monk family. Virginia Woolf stayed at the hotel in the spring of 1914 for three weeks while recovering from a bout of mental illness. She later based her 1927 novel To the Lighthouse on Godrevy Lighthouse on the other side of St Ives Bay. Film director David Lean also once stayed in the hotel.

Author Rosamunde Pilcher featured the hotel (renamed as The Sands Hotel) in her novels The Shell Seekers (1988) and Winter Solstice (2000).

== Architecture and facilities ==
The hotel is a traditional cream-painted building, three storeys high with two large bays at either side. It has six chimney stacks, two on top of either bay and two in the middle. It has several extensions and a large conservatory at the front, overlooking the beach, which was refurbished in 2015.

== G7 controversy ==
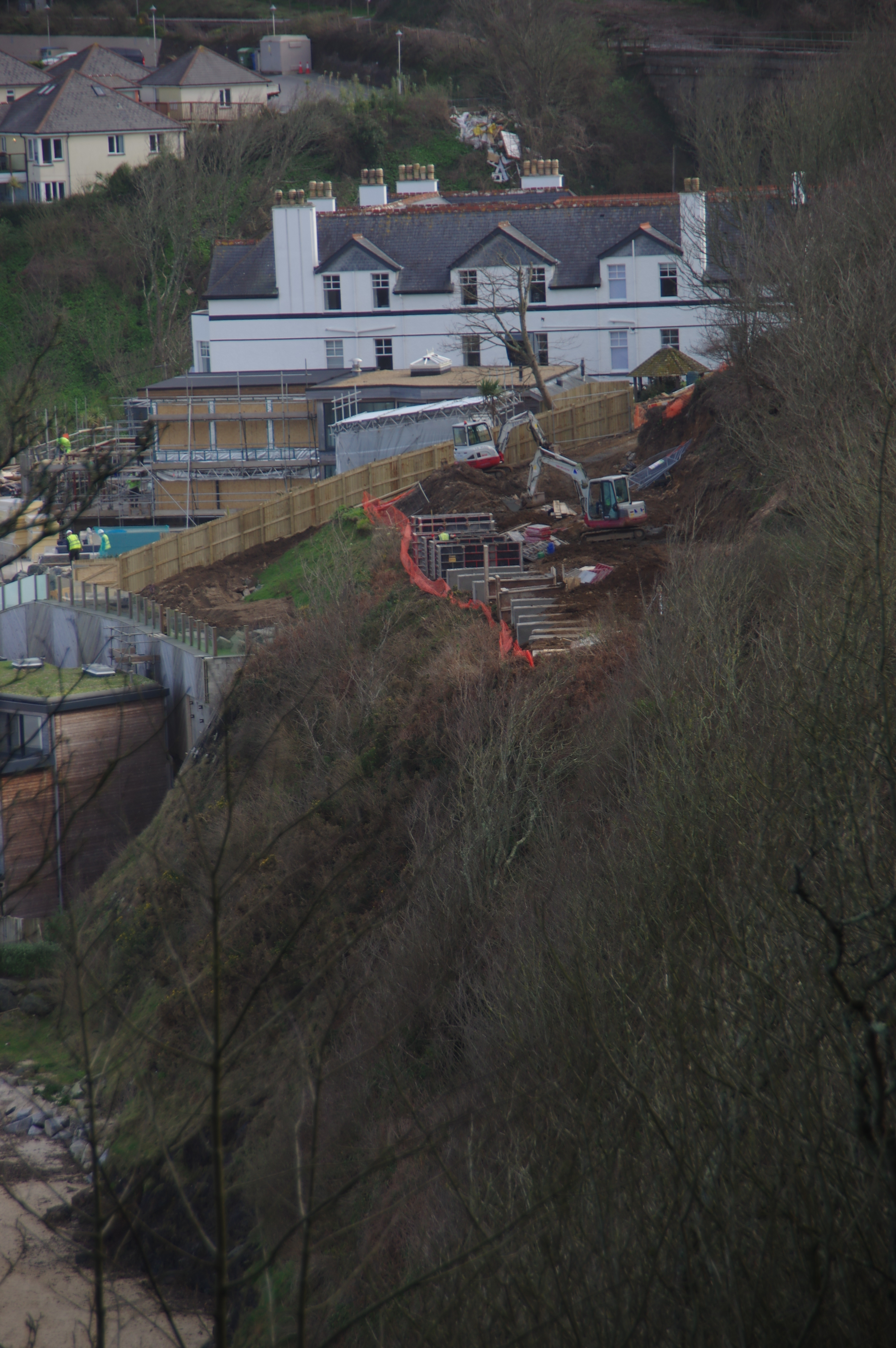
The development in preparation for the G7 in March 2021

In January 2021 it was announced that Carbis Bay would be the venue for that year's G7 Summit in June. In March 2021, the local planning authority launched an investigation to determine if the Carbis Bay Hotel, which was developing facilities for the summit, had contravened planning permissions. The hotel denied it had breached any regulations.
