= 47th G7 summit =

2021 international leader meeting in England

Coordinates: 50.1982°N 5.4666°W

47th G7 Summit

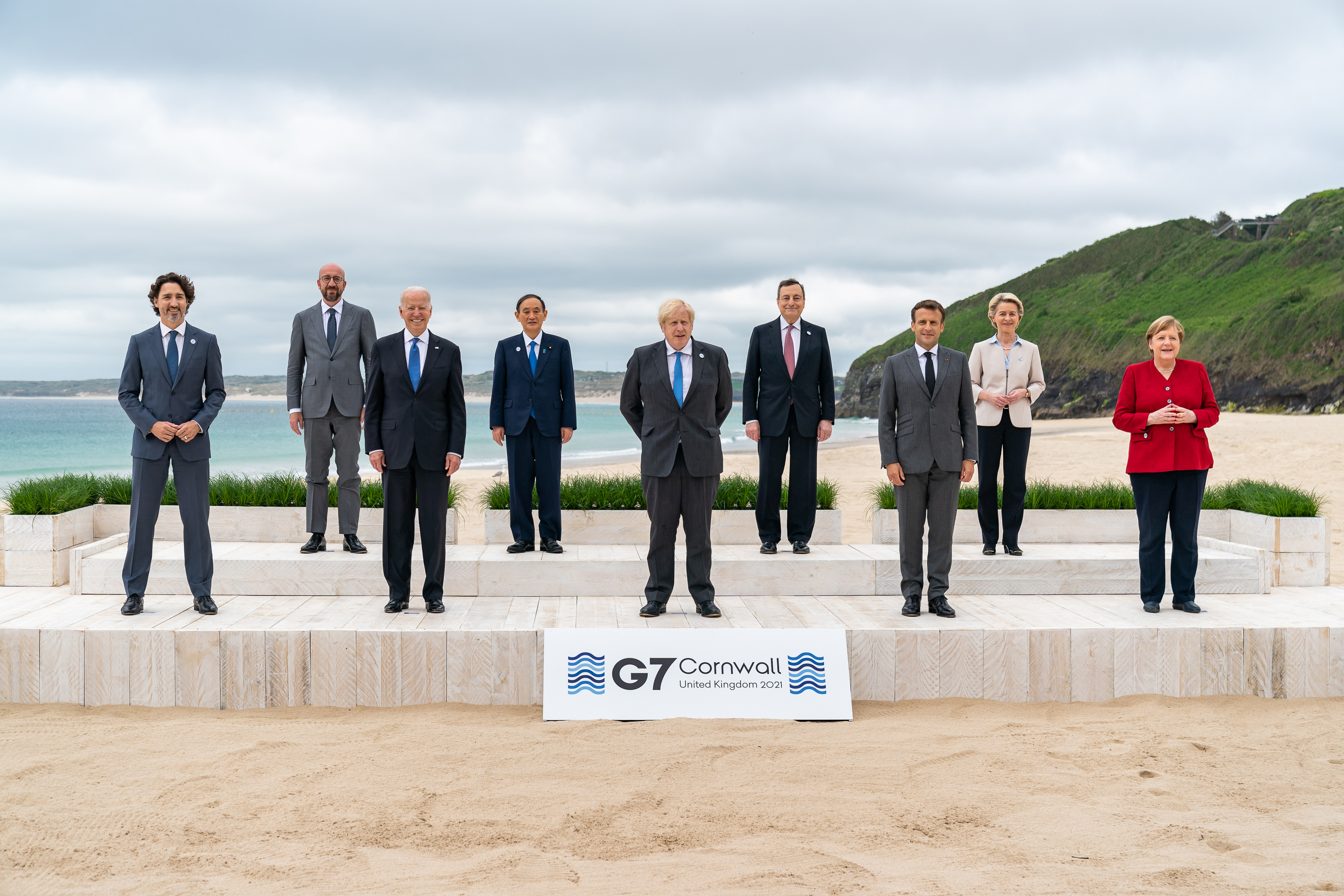
- Host country: United Kingdom
- Date: 11–13 June 2021
- Motto: Building Back Better
- Cities: Carbis Bay
- Venues: Carbis Bay Estate
- Participants: Canada; France; Germany; Italy; Japan; United Kingdom; United States; European Union; Invited guests: Australia; India; South Africa; South Korea
- Follows: 45th G7 summit ~~46th G7 summit~~ (cancelled)
- Precedes: 48th G7 summit
- Website: Official website

The 47th G7 summit was held from 11 to 13 June 2021 in Cornwall, England, during the United Kingdom's tenure of the presidency of the Group of Seven (G7), an inter-governmental political forum of seven advanced nations.

The participants included the leaders of the seven G7 member states, as well as representatives of the European Union. The president of the European Commission has been a permanently welcome participant at all meetings and decision-making since 1981, while the current president of the European Council has been the EU's co-representative since the 36th G8 summit in 2010.

== Leaders at the summit ==
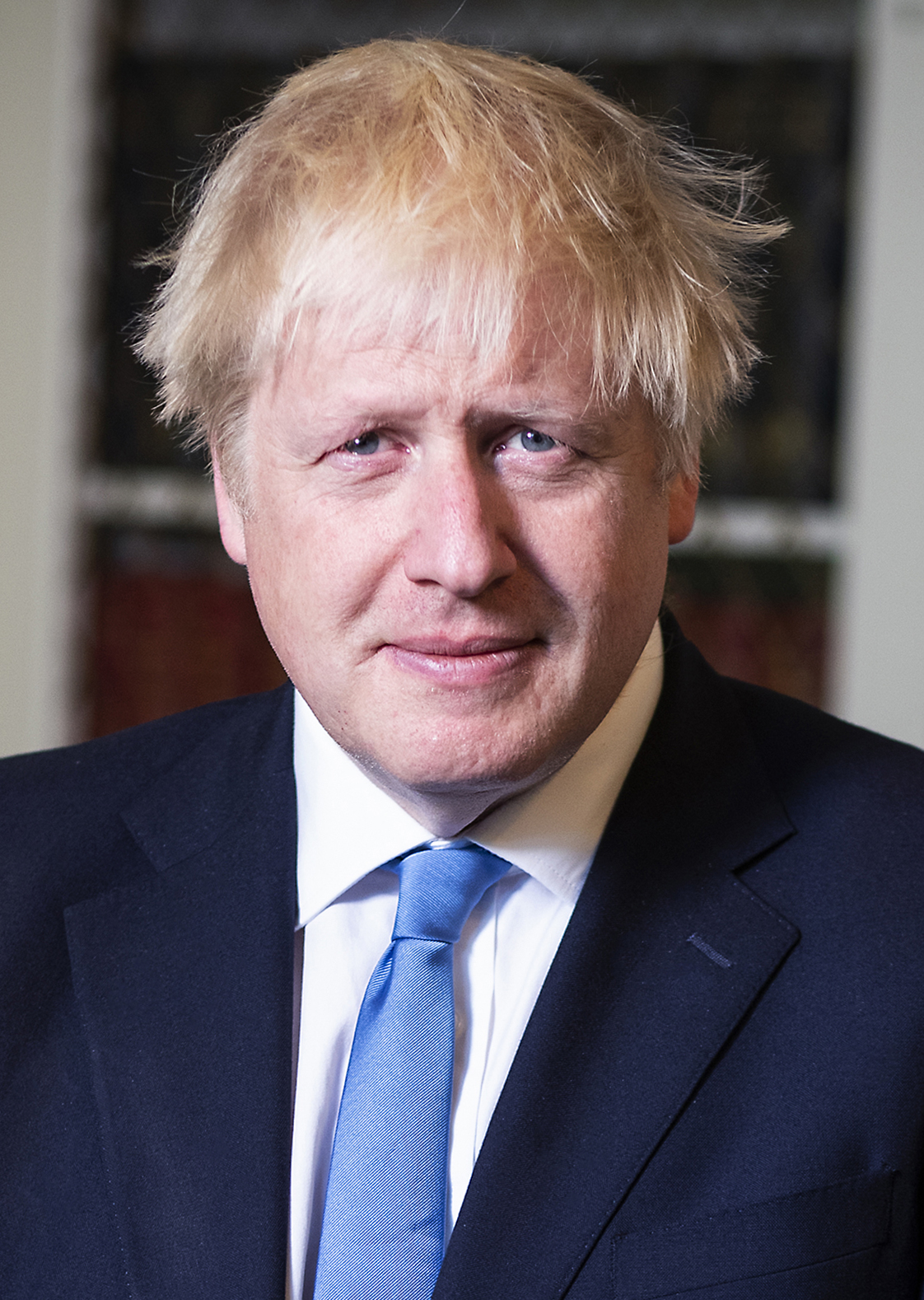
Boris Johnson chaired the 47th G7 summit.

Participants included leaders of the G7 member states plus representatives of the European Union. The president of the European Commission has been a permanent participant at all meetings since 1981. The president of the European Council has been the EU's co-representative since the 36th G8 summit hosted by Canada in 2010.

In March 2014, the G7 declared that a meaningful discussion was currently not possible with Russia in the context of the G8. Since then, meetings have continued within the G7 process. US President Donald Trump and French President Emmanuel Macron were reported to have agreed that Russia should be invited to the 46th G7 summit in 2020, but the United Kingdom and Canada threatened to veto such a proposal if the United States and France went ahead. The 2020 summit was ultimately cancelled due to the COVID-19 pandemic and the 2021 summit implemented safety measures during the reunion, though the use of masks and social distancing was sometimes ignored due to most leaders having received COVID-19 vaccinations and tests before the summit.

Boris Johnson, the British Prime Minister, invited leaders from India, South Korea, South Africa, and Australia, all of whom accepted. It has been suggested that Johnson was attempting to expand the G7 group, a meeting forum for the world's leading economies, to create the D10, a forum for the world's ten leading democracies.

The 2021 summit was the first summit attended by Italian Prime Minister Mario Draghi and US President Joe Biden, and was the final summit attended by German Chancellor Angela Merkel. It was also the first and only summit for Japanese Prime Minister Yoshihide Suga.

Queen Elizabeth II also hosted G7 leaders at the Eden Project following the first day of talks.

=== Participants and representatives ===
Core G7 Members The host state and leader are shown in bold text.
| Member | | Represented by | Title |
|---|---|---|---|
| (Canada) | Canada | Justin Trudeau | Prime Minister |
| (France) | France | Emmanuel Macron | President |
| (Germany) | Germany | Angela Merkel | Chancellor |
| (Italy) | Italy | Mario Draghi | Prime Minister |
| (Japan) | Japan | Yoshihide Suga | Prime Minister |
| (United Kingdom) | **United Kingdom** (**Host**) | **Boris Johnson** | **Prime Minister** |
| (United States) | United States | Joe Biden | President |
| (European Union) | European Union | Ursula von der Leyen | Commission President |
| (European Union) | European Union | Charles Michel | Council President |
**Invitees**
| Guest | | Represented by | Title |
| (Australia) | Australia | Scott Morrison | Prime Minister |
| (India) | India | Narendra Modi (virtually present) | Prime Minister |
| (South Korea) | South Korea | Moon Jae-in | President |
| (South Africa) | South Africa | Cyril Ramaphosa | President |
| (International Monetary Fund) | International Monetary Fund | Kristalina Georgieva (virtually present) | managing director |
| (United Nations) | United Nations | António Guterres | Secretary-General |
| (World Health Organization) | World Health Organization | Tedros Adhanom Ghebreyesus | Director-General |

== Gallery of participating leaders ==
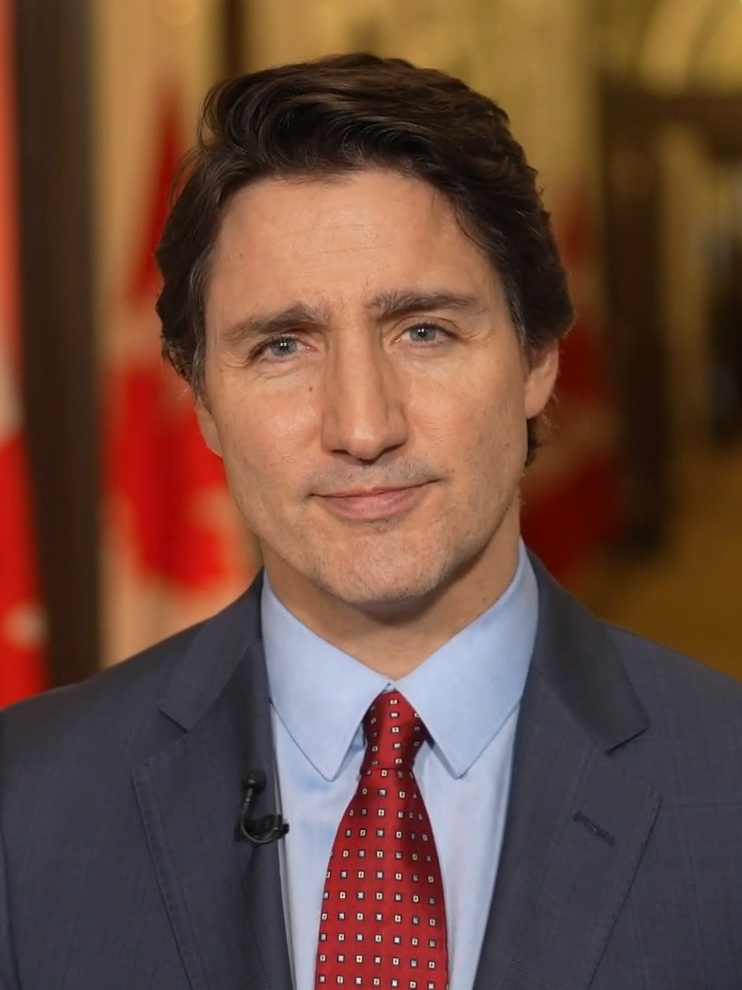
(Canada) Canada
Justin Trudeau,
Prime Minister

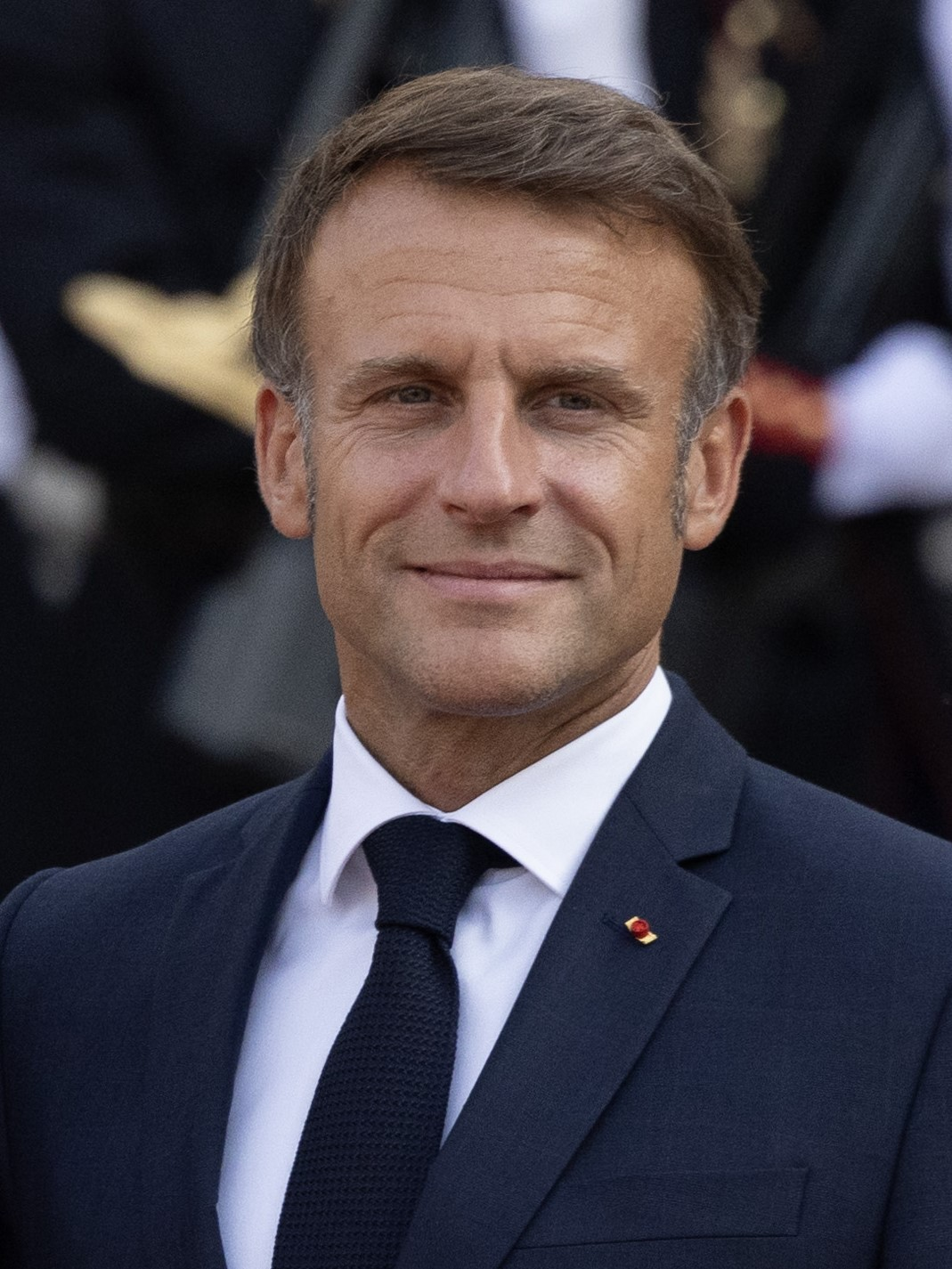
(France) France
Emmanuel Macron,
President

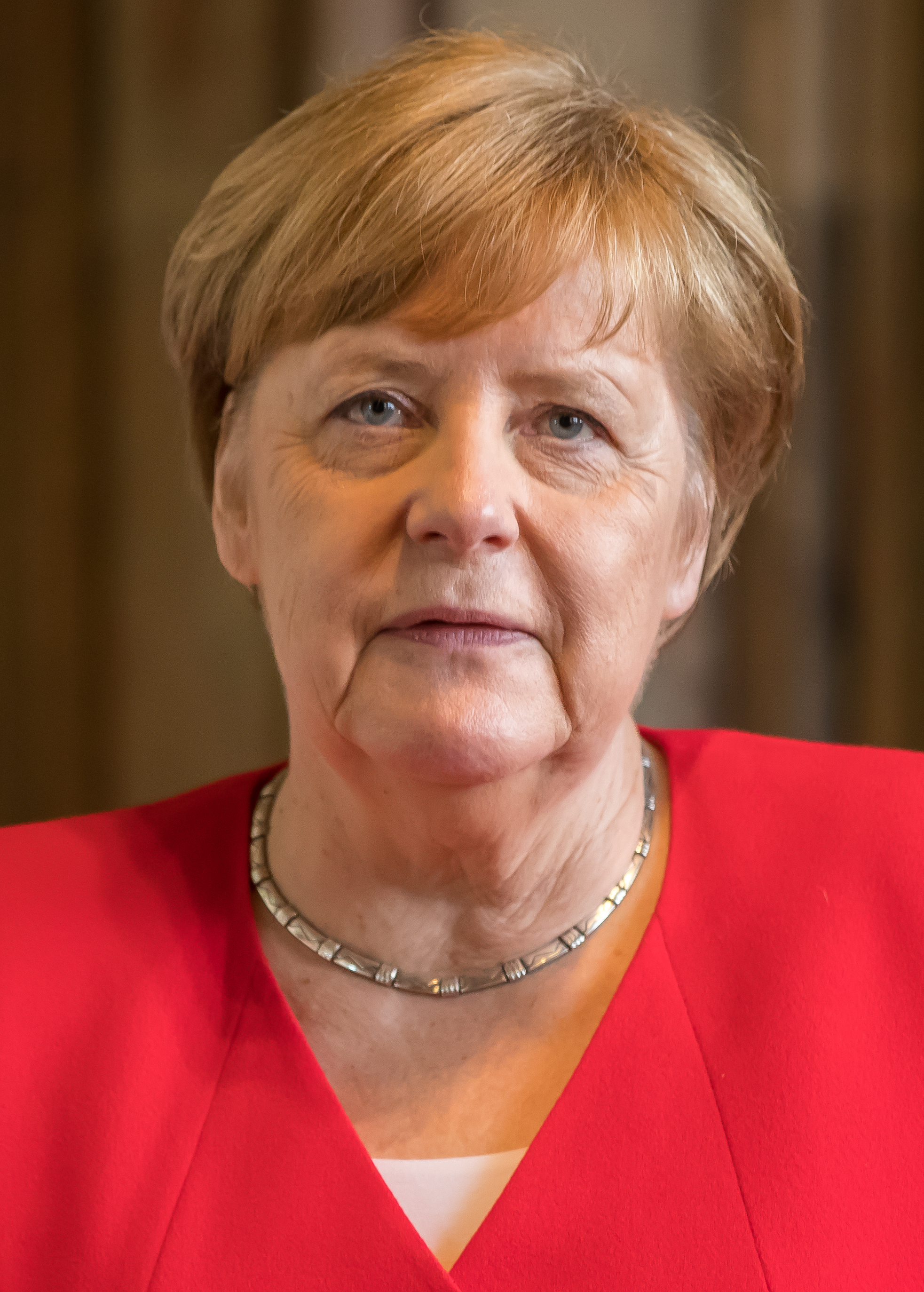
(Germany) Germany
Angela Merkel,
Chancellor

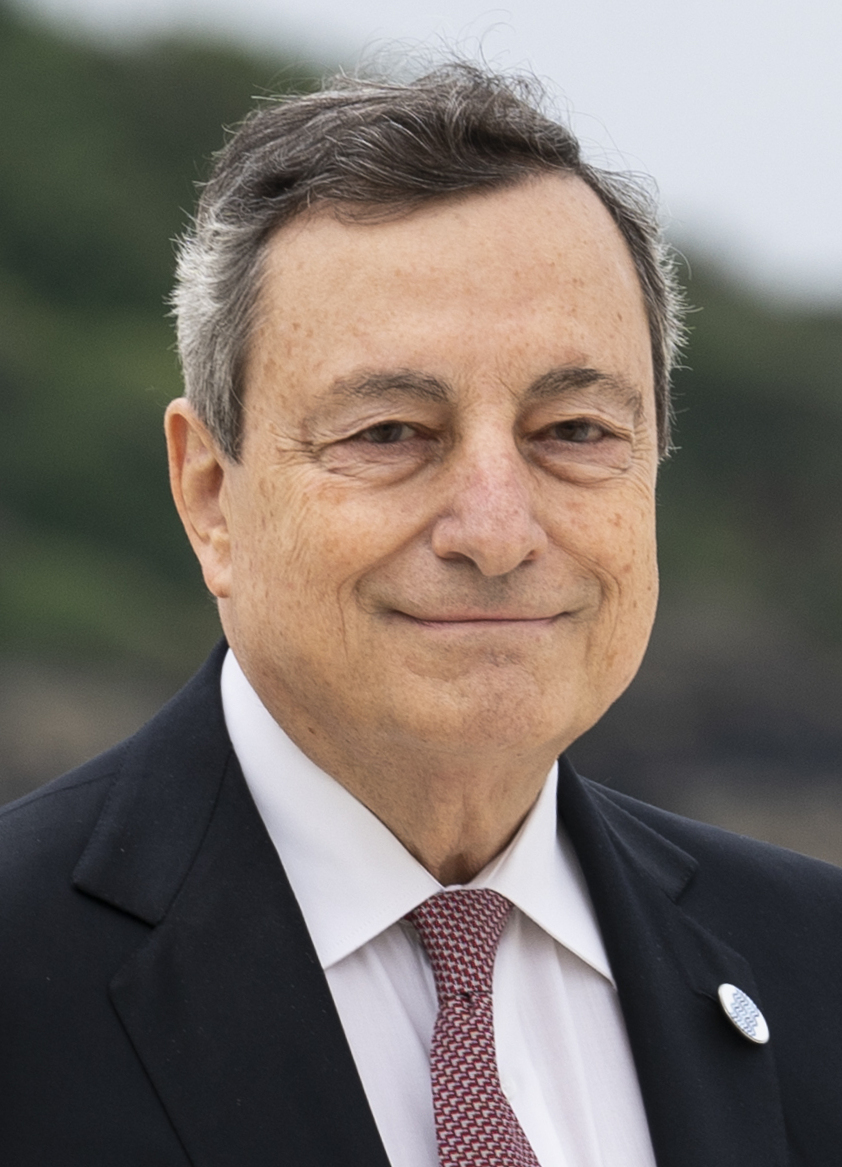
(Italy) Italy
Mario Draghi,
Prime Minister

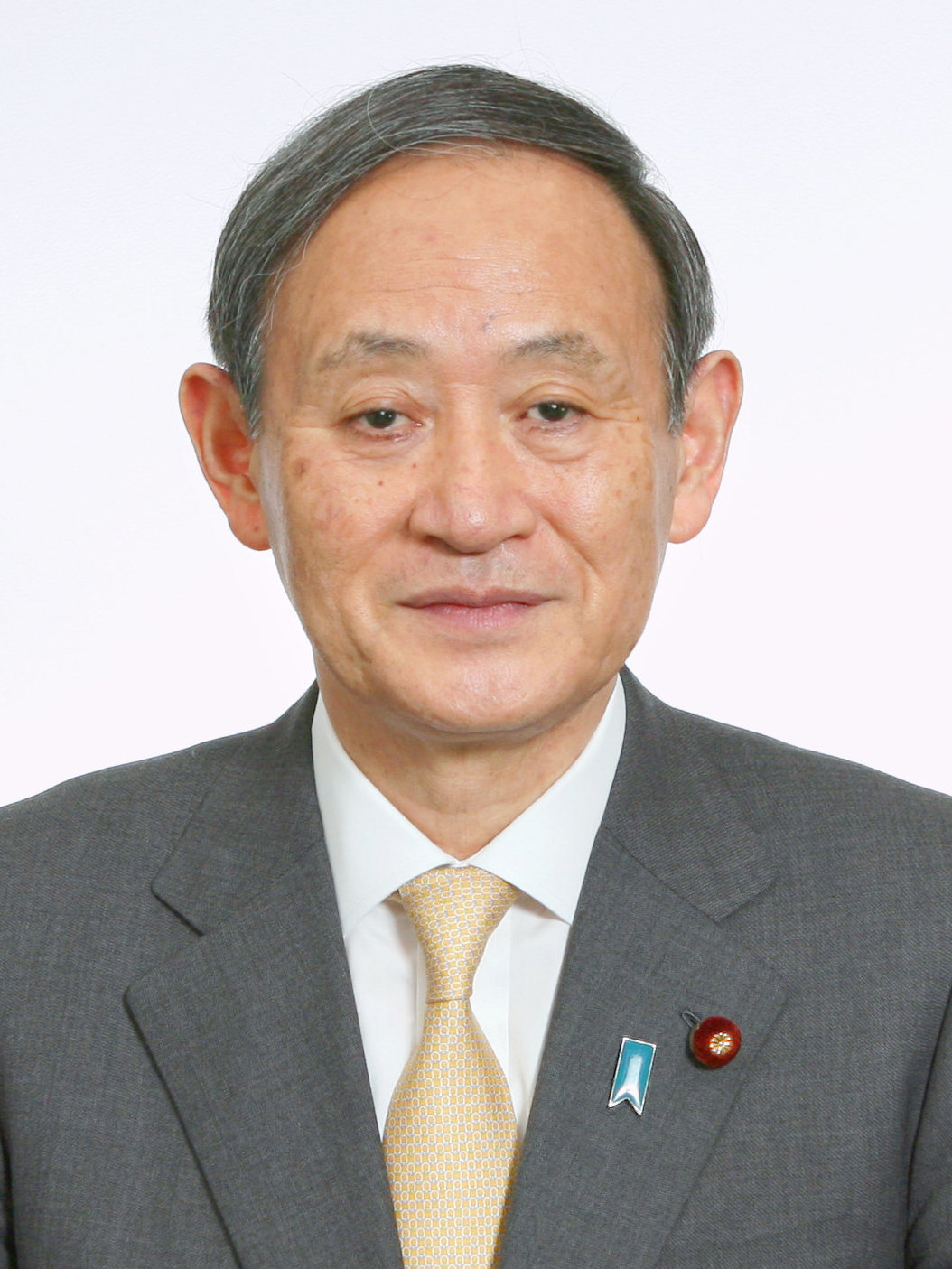
(Japan) Japan
Yoshihide Suga,
Prime Minister

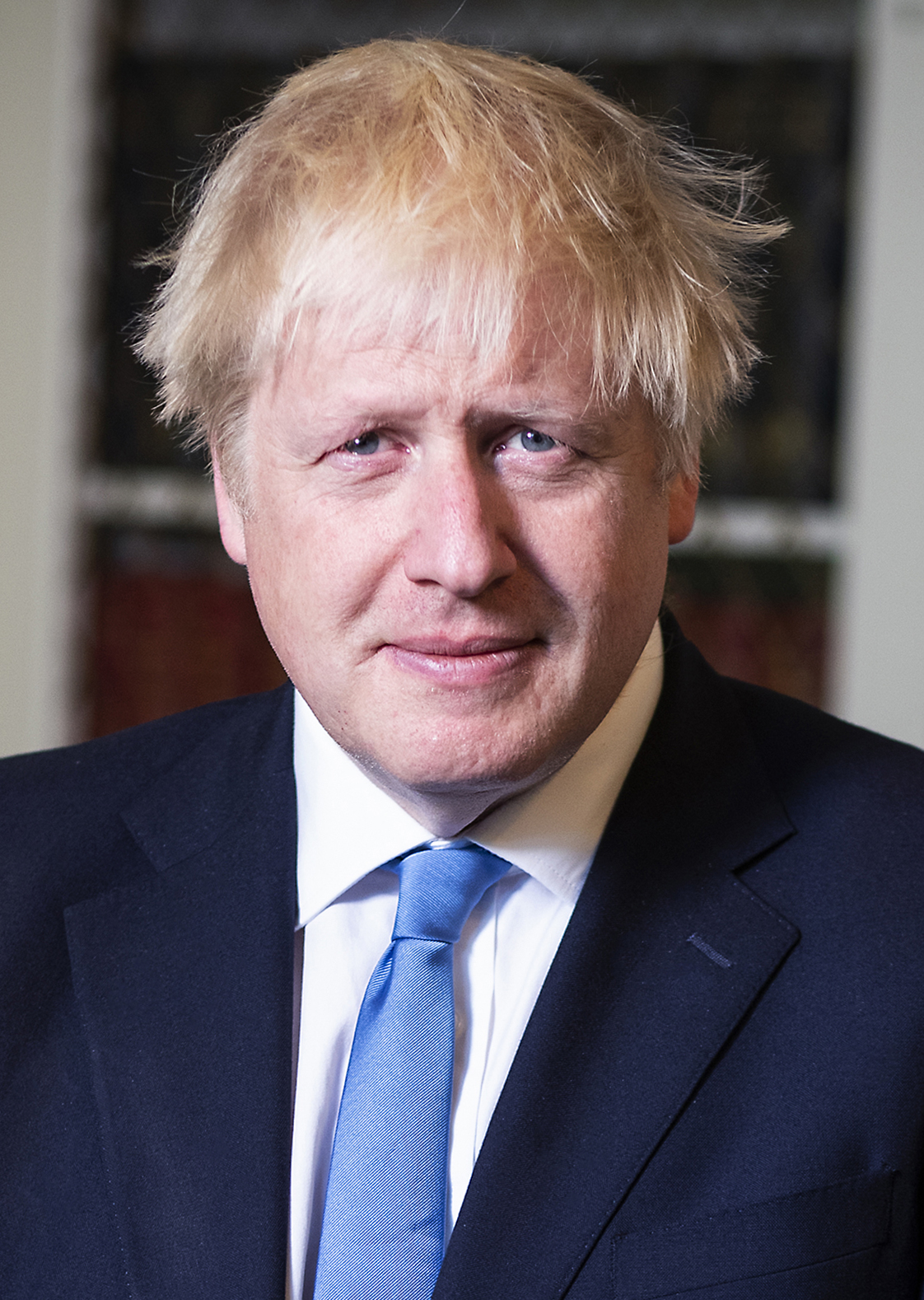
(United Kingdom) United Kingdom
Boris Johnson,
Prime Minister (Host)

(United States) United States
Joe Biden,
President
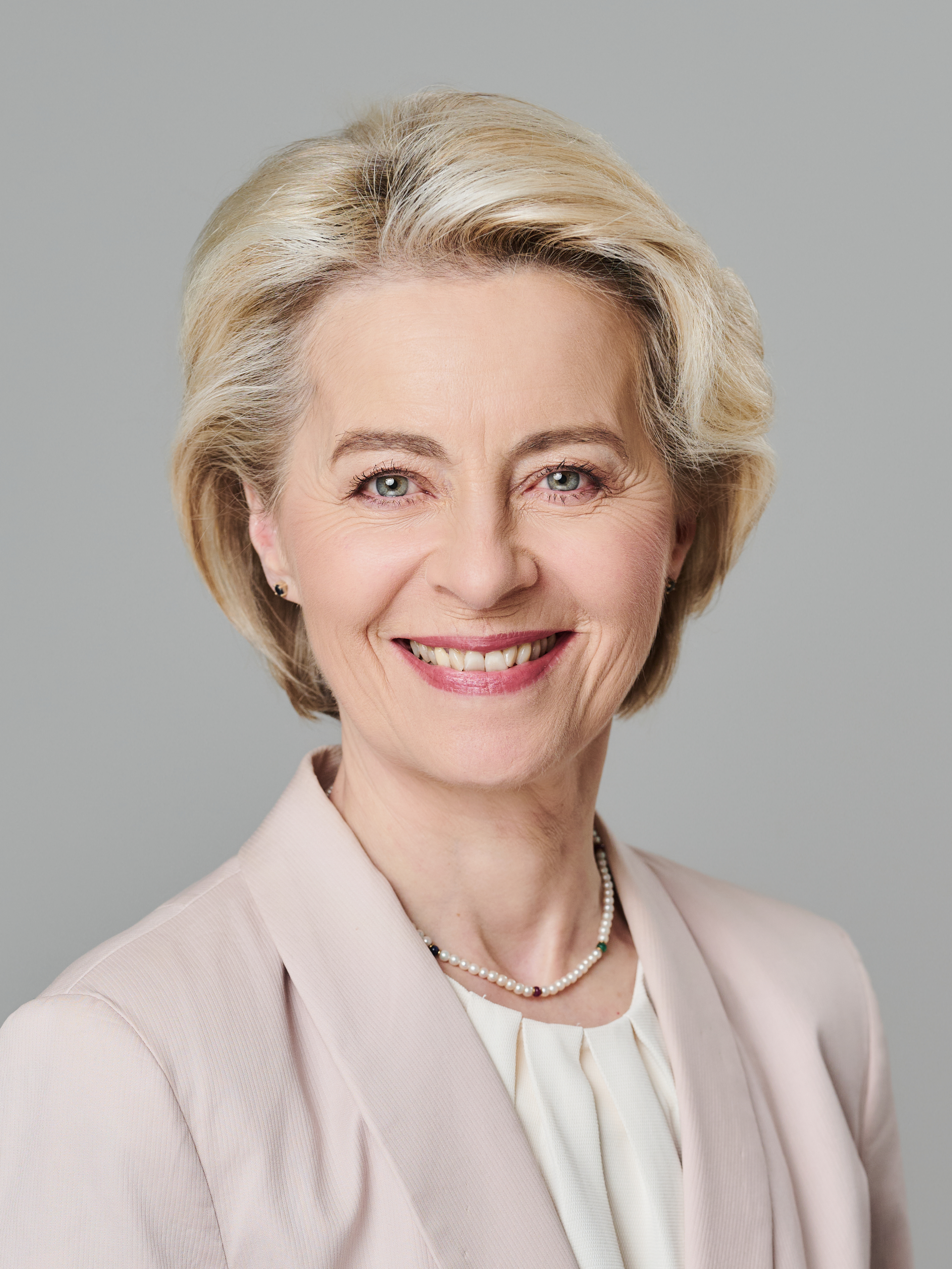
(European Union) European Union
Ursula von der Leyen,
President of the European Commission

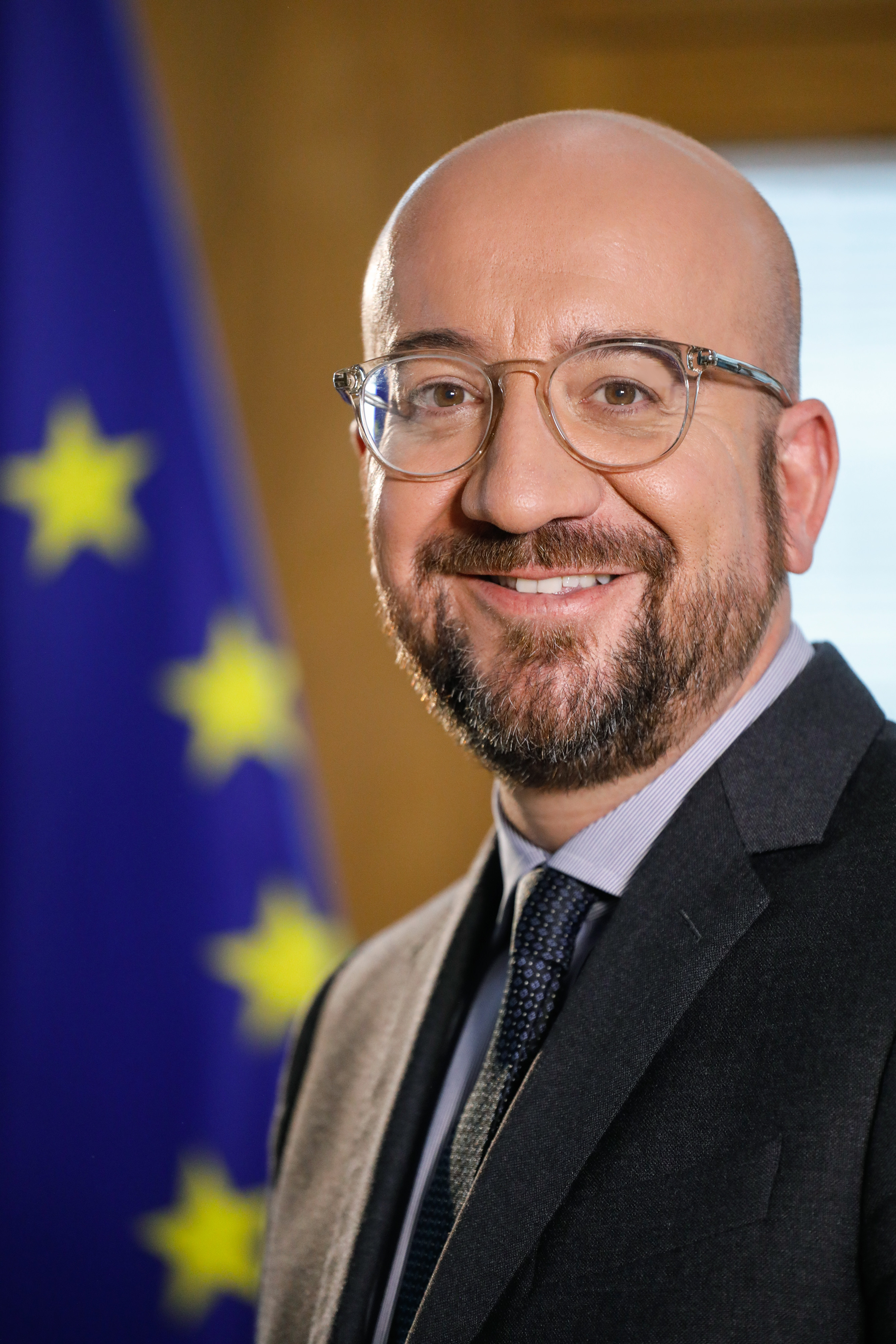
(European Union) European Union
Charles Michel,
President of the European Council

=== Invited guests ===
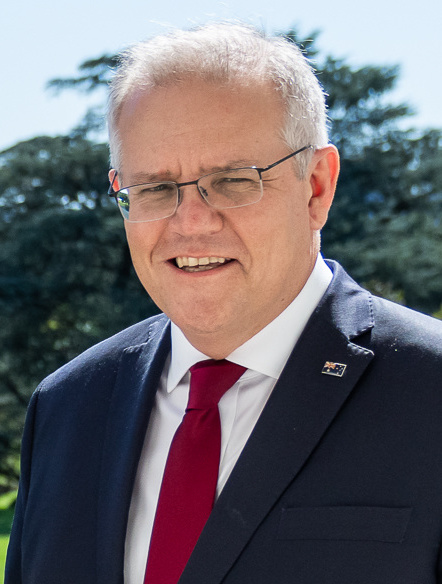
Australia
Scott Morrison,
Prime Minister

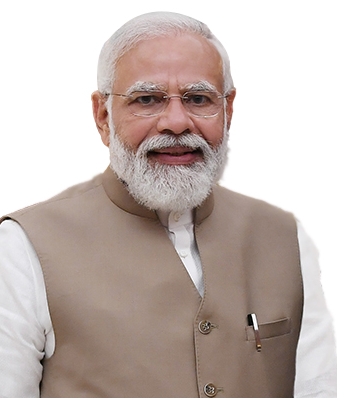
India
Narendra Modi,
Prime Minister

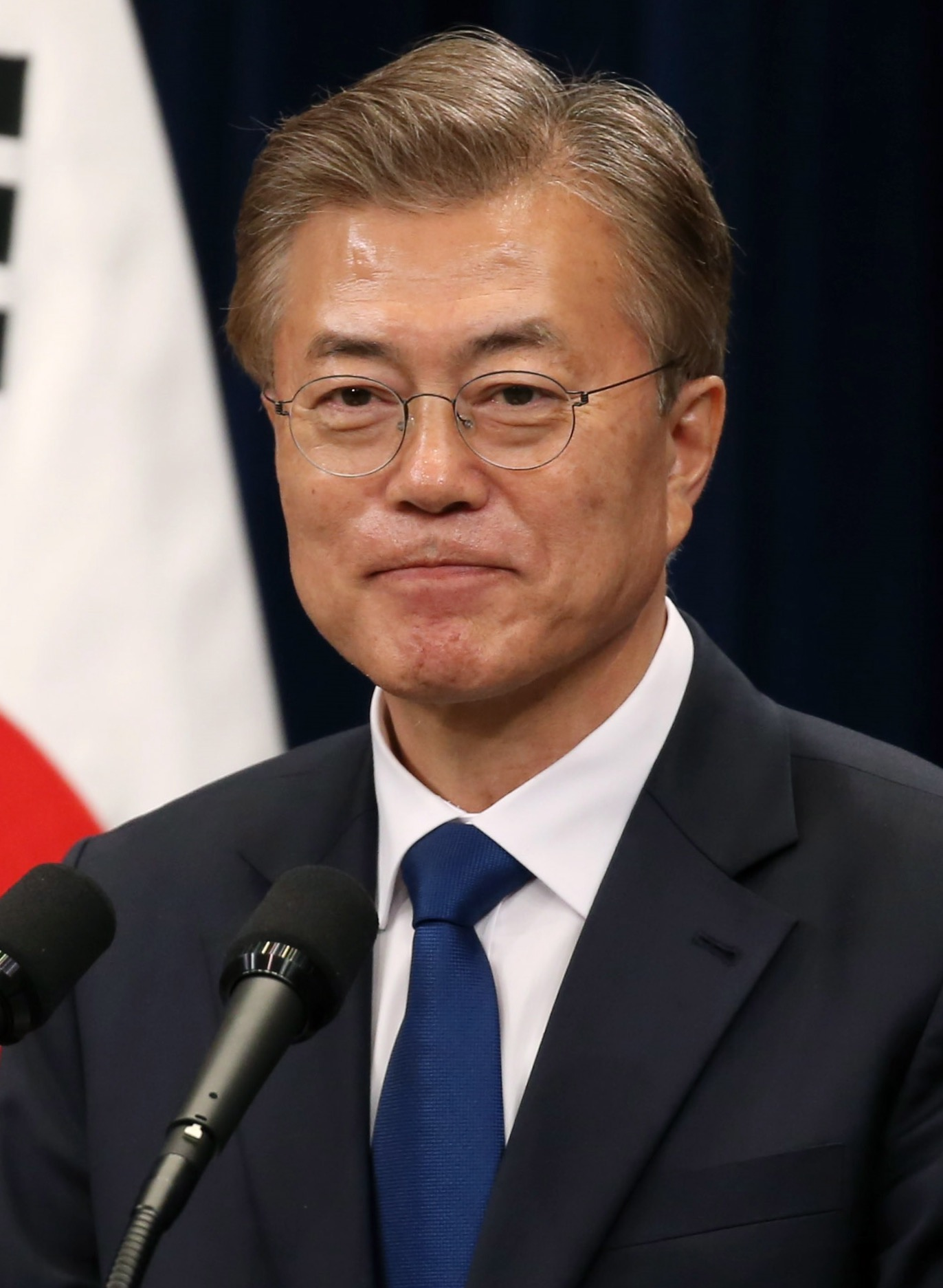
South Korea
Moon Jae-in, President

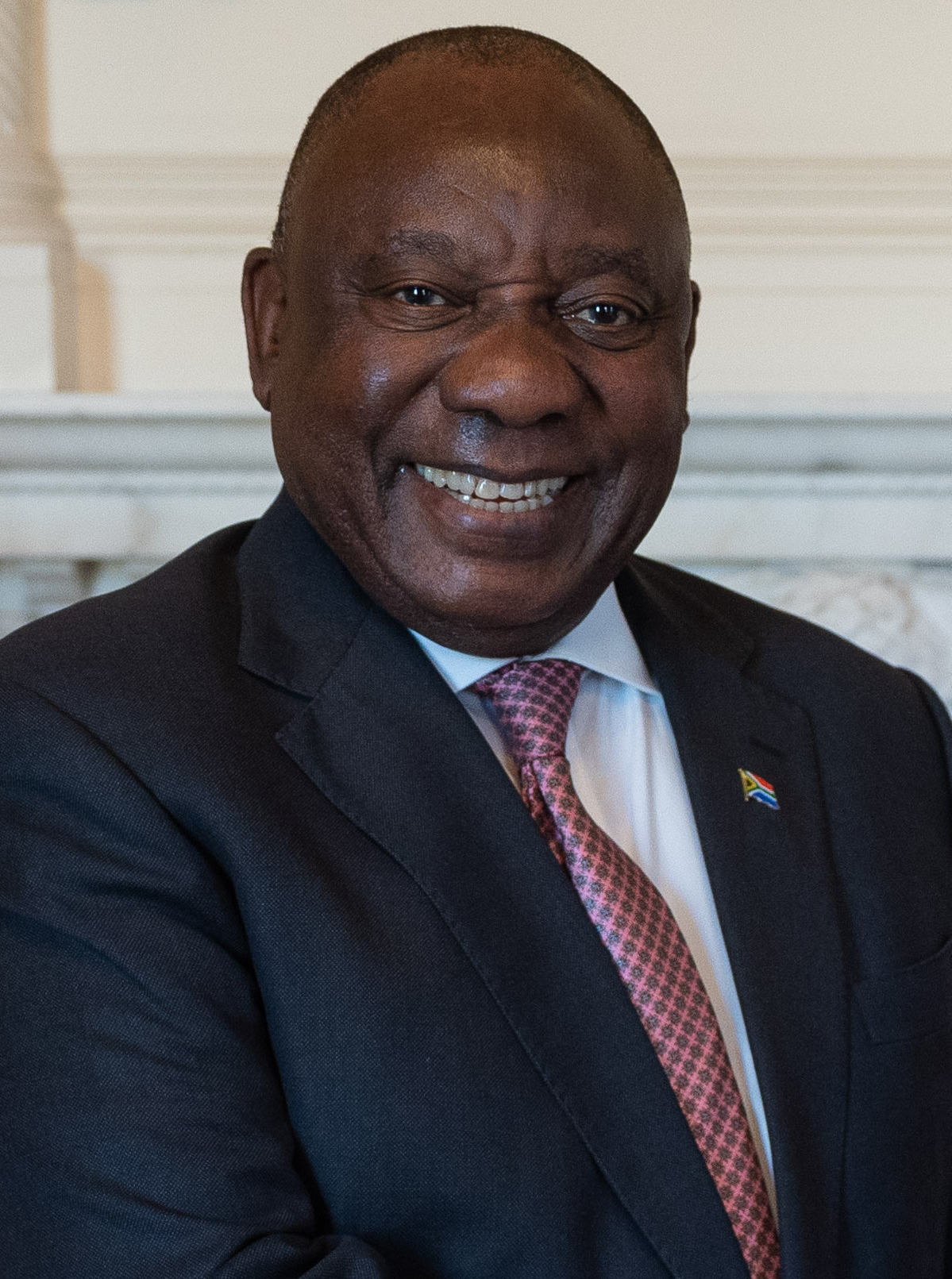
South Africa
Cyril Ramaphosa,
President

António Guterres, the United Nations Secretary-General, also attended the summit, whilst Narendra Modi, the Indian Prime Minister, participated remotely due to the ongoing COVID-19 crisis in India.

== Agenda ==
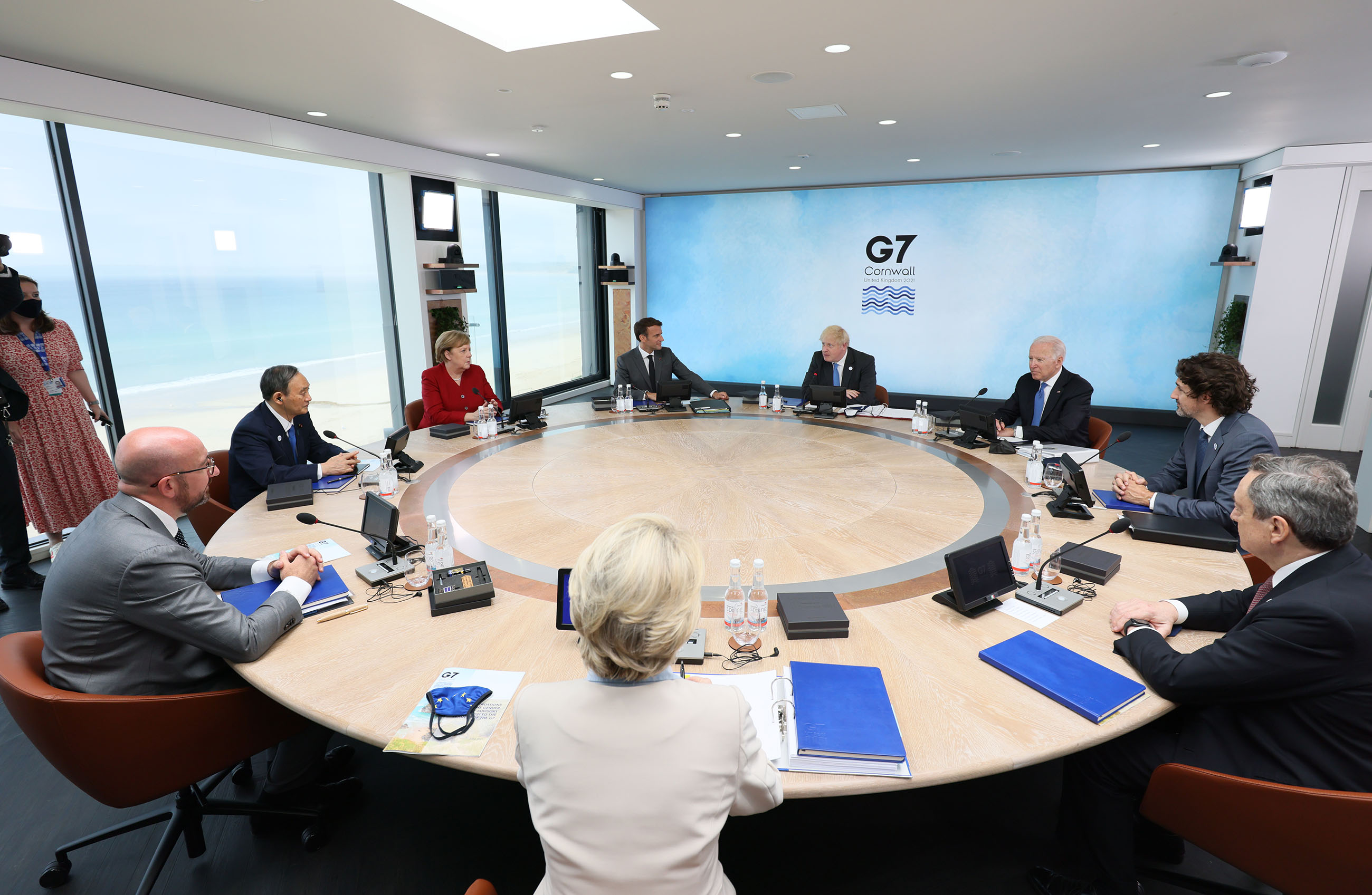
Working session on 11 June 2021

Topics of discussion included developing a response to the COVID-19 pandemic and climate change. Johnson pledged to call for the G7 to work on a global approach to pandemics to ensure an equal global distribution of COVID-19 vaccines and to prevent future pandemics. He proposed a five-point plan to prevent future pandemics, which includes a worldwide network of zoonotic research hubs, developing global manufacturing capacity for treatments and vaccines, the design of a global early warning system, the agreement of global protocols for a future health emergency and the reduction of trade barriers. The G7 nations agreed to pledge 1 billion vaccines to other countries. South African President Cyril Ramaphosa urged the group to boost COVID-19 testing, diagnostics and vaccines to help finance the World Health Organization's program on those issues. Johnson also focused on climate change, a top priority for the United Kingdom ahead of the COP26 conference, which it was due to host in November 2021. UK Secretary for Business Kwasi Kwarteng indicated that Johnson sought coordinated action on carbon border taxes, green finance, the phase-out of coal and helping poorer countries to step up climate action. While the taxes were backed by the EU and US, EU climate ambassador Mark Vanhuekelen indicated that Australia may oppose the measures. The G7 nations pledged to reach net-zero emissions by 2050.

Another topic of discussion was international co-ordination on economic policies. United States Secretary of the Treasury Janet Yellen said there would be a revival in American multilateralism, focused on continued economic support. Other finance ministers, including Italian economy minister Daniele Franco, French Finance Minister Bruno Le Maire and UK chancellor Rishi Sunak similarly called for close economic co-ordination on recovery plans and economic policies. Negotiations over reforming the corporate taxation of multinationals were also carried out, with the United States agreeing to a deadline of the summer to make progress on the issue after threatening to impose tariffs on European countries in retaliation for their new digital sales tax. The United States also reviewed a plan for the IMF to allocate up to £500bn in special drawing rights to its members, which had been widely endorsed by other countries but was previously blocked by the US. The G7 countries also launched the Build Back Better World initiative, a plan to fund infrastructure development in low and middle income countries.

G7 finance officials also supported the need to regulate digital currencies. German Finance Minister Olaf Scholz issued a statement about his concerns of authorizing the launch of Facebook's Diem (formerly Libra) cryptocurrency in Europe.

Johnson stated that he would aim to 'unlock' travel restrictions between UK and amber-list US at G7 summit. It is unclear whether any agreement was made.

The G7 nations called for peace in the Taiwan Strait. In response to this, a spokesperson for the Chinese embassy in London stated that "The days when global decisions were dictated by a small group of countries are long gone."

== Events leading to the summit ==
Location of the 47th G7 summit at the Carbis Bay Hotel, 402 km (250 mi) from London

On 12 February 2021, finance ministers and central bank governors from the G7 members held a meeting to discuss the relevant financial issues, from fiscal stimulus to aid for poor countries. They were joined by representatives from the European Commission, the European Central Bank, and the Eurogroup, as well as leaders of the IMF, World Bank Group, OECD and Financial Stability Board.

On 19 February 2021, a virtual meeting of G7 leaders was held to call for further international cooperation on vaccine distribution and to take steps on rebuilding from the coronavirus pandemic. The United Kingdom is expected to challenge other G7 countries to speed up the development of future vaccines to 100 days (a target previously set by the Coalition for Epidemic Preparedness Innovations) and to build momentum for a more coordinated approach to future pandemics, including the creation of a global health treaty. Ahead of the meeting, Johnson promised to share surplus vaccines doses with developing countries and to call for help to develop vaccines more quickly. The meeting was US President Joe Biden's first multilateral engagement after taking office. He stressed the importance of international cooperation and declared "America is Back."

Japanese Prime Minister Yoshihide Suga stated Japan's determination to host the Tokyo Olympic and Paralympic Games. The G7 leaders supported the Olympics in the Leaders' Statement.

Also on 19 February 2021, the G7 leaders released their 'Leader's Statement' in which they pledged to intensify cooperation on the health response to COVID-19 and to support economic recovery. All leaders agreed on the need to ensure coronavirus vaccines, therapeutics and diagnostics reach those that need them and agreed on the need for a green, sustainable global recovery, in particular welcoming the United States' readmission to the Paris Climate Agreement. David Malpass, President of the World Bank, welcomed what he said was a new "spirit of international cooperation" by G7 nations and its enlarged commitments to COVAX. However, Malpass also stated that a lack of transparency of contracts and delivery schedules was hampering the effort to get vaccines to developing countries quickly.

On 12 March 2021, the Foreign Ministers of G7 and the High Representative of the EU issued a joint statement on Hong Kong electoral change, expressing their grave concerns at the Chinese authorities' decision fundamentally to erode democratic elements of the electoral system in Hong Kong.

On 18 March 2021, the Foreign Ministers of G7 and the High Representative of the EU issued a joint statement of condemnation of the continued annexation of Crimea by Russia.

On 22 March 2021, Johnson invited the South African President Cyril Ramaphosa to attend the G7 Leaders' Summit as a guest.

On 31 March 2021, the G7 Trade Ministers held their first meeting under the inaugural G7 Trade Track. They reaffirmed the importance of the rules-based multilateral trading system and welcomed Ngozi Okonjo-Iweala, the new WTO Director-General, to their meeting.

On 12 April 2021, the G7 foreign ministers issued their joint appeal on the eve of a NATO meeting in Brussels over concerns that the years-long War in Donbas could escalate sharply.

On 5 June 2021, during a meeting at Lancaster House in London, the G7 finance ministers agreed on a deal to commit towards a minimum global corporate tax rate of at least 15 percent, which will be aimed at preventing tax havens which cater for large multinational corporations. The commitment will also include steps to ensure that taxes are paid in the countries where businesses operate.

== After the summit ==
=== Indian PM's address ===
Following the summit, media in India widely reported on Indian PM's address to G7. However, no address transcript, video or audio was released publicly. The Press Information Bureau of India, government's PR agency released only a statement about the speech, instead of releasing the transcript as is usual.

=== COVID-19 outbreak ===
Following the summit the confirmed COVID-19 cases in Cornwall increased to 81.7 per 100,000 population on the Sunday after the summit, from 2.8 per 100,000 on the Sunday before the summit. The districts in which G7 events took place subsequently had the highest rates in Cornwall, with St Ives, the town nearest Carbis Bay, the highest at 920 per 100,000. The UK government denied the summit had caused the rapid rise in cases in Cornwall, pointing to the increase in summer tourism and an outbreak among students. Professor Tim Spector, lead scientist on the COVID Symptom Study, explained it as a "sudden influx of holidaymakers over half-term, as well as the recent G7 Summit and a previously unexposed local population".

=== United States' non-consultation of United Kingdom and NATO over Afghanistan troop withdrawal ===
During the summit, Biden and Johnson had announced a New Atlantic Charter as evidence for their Special Relationship. The Biden administration subsequently withdrew American troops from Afghanistan in August 2021 without any coordination with other NATO members, prompting backlash from members of the British government.

=== AUKUS ===
Brokered by the UK, details of the AUKUS agreement between Australia, the US, and the UK were agreed during the summit. The discussions took place without the knowledge of French President Emmanuel Macron.

=== Reaction from China ===
The Chinese government reacted negatively in response to criticism from the G7 of its human rights record, with the Chinese embassy in the UK accusing the group of "interfering", as well as "lies, rumours and baseless accusations".

== See also ==
- 2021 Brussels summit
- 2021 Russia–United States summit
