= Passmore Edwards Centre =

Library in Newton Abbot, Devon, England

Coordinates: 50.5304°N 3.6130°W

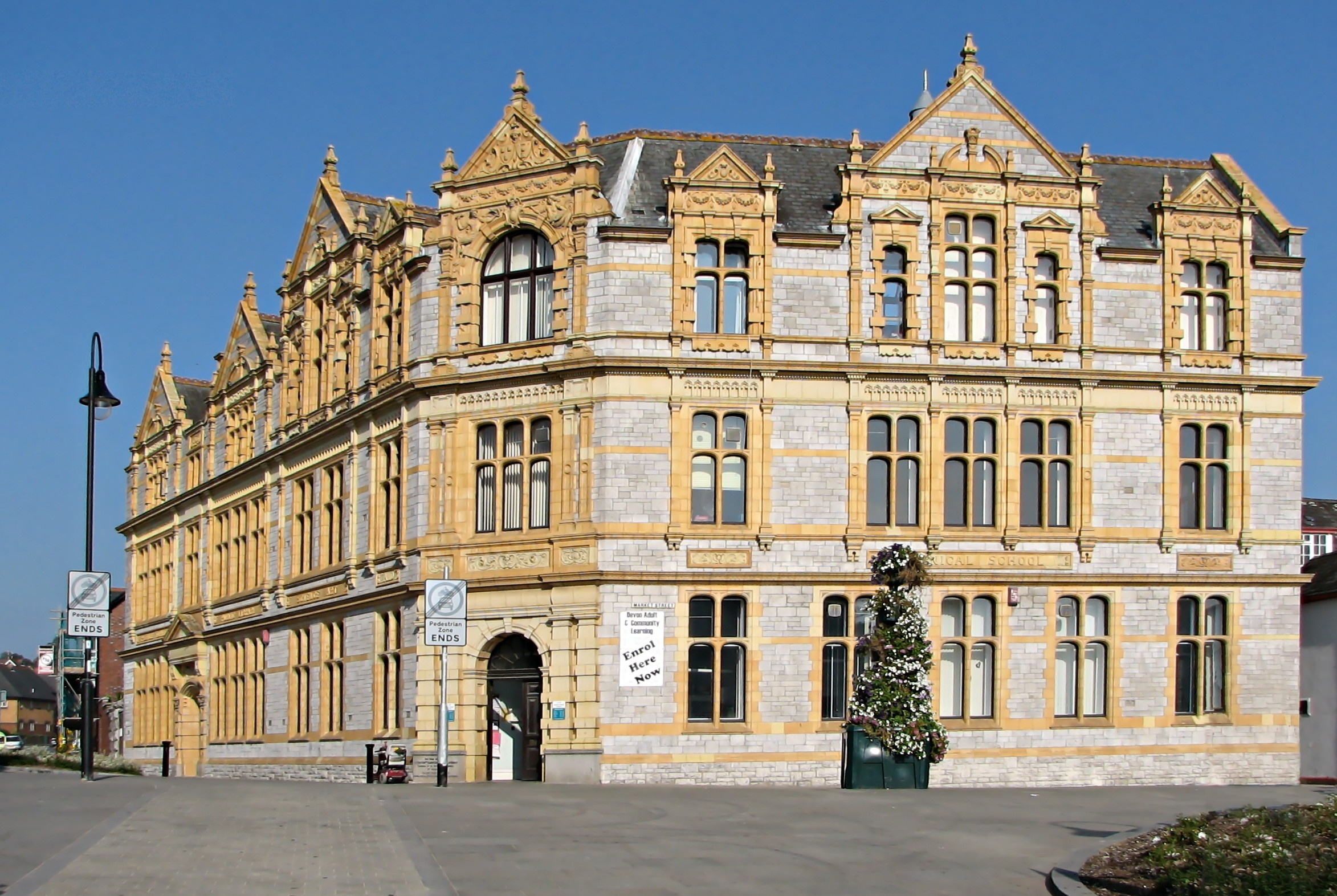
Frontage in 2008

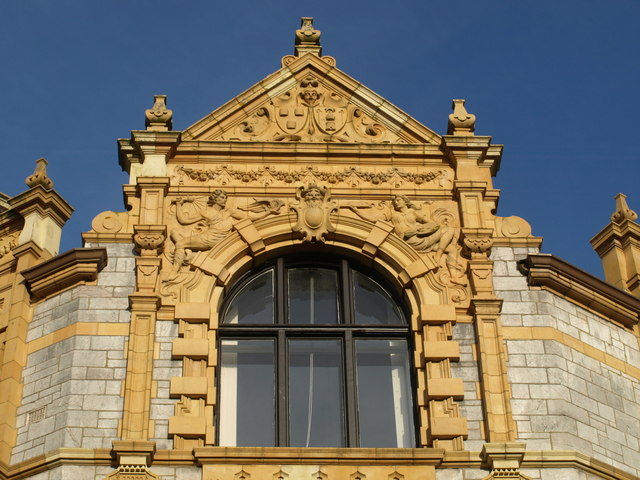
Detail of window and pediment

The Passmore Edwards Centre is a grade II listed building in Newton Abbot, Devon, in England. It was built as a library and technical school by philanthropist John Passmore Edwards in memory of his mother who was born in the town. The building was completed between 1902 and 1904 to a design by architect Silvanus Trevail and his assistant Alfred Cornelius. It remains in use as a library.

== Description ==
The building is L-shaped in plan with frontages onto Bank Street on the south-west and Market Street on the south-east. The frontage is built of grey, square-dressed Devon limestone with yellow ceramic detailing. The west return wall is of Devon limestone rubble while the east return and rear walls are of cream bricks laid in English bond. The roof is slate with chimney stacks at the sides and rear. The external corner of the structure is canted to form the main entrance of one bay at the junction of the two streets. There are ten bays on the south-western elevation on Bank Street, to the left of the entrance, and five on Market Street to the right of the entrance.

The building has three floors. There is a continuous plinth running along the façade at ground level. Cornices run continuously across the façade at the top of the ground and first floors, the cornice at the top of the second floor is interrupted by triangular and curved window pediments. The upper two floors are decorated with pilasters and finials that protrude from the façade. The windows have mullions and transoms and the top-most panes have semi-circular heads. The second floor is particularly elaborate with swags, finials and Gibbs surrounds to the windows. Lettering on ceramic panels across the front gives the original name of the "Passmore Edwards Library and Science, Art and Technical School". The main entrance has a significant pedimented doorcase decorated at the second storey with figures representing Art and Learning. The double doors are topped with a semi-circular fanlight within a Gibbs surround. The fourth bay from the north end of the Bank Street elevation has a secondary entrance with a doorcase and triangular pediment. The interior has a mosaic floor and retains some oak panelled doors. The staircase is Jacobean in style with square balusters and newels with pendants.

== History ==
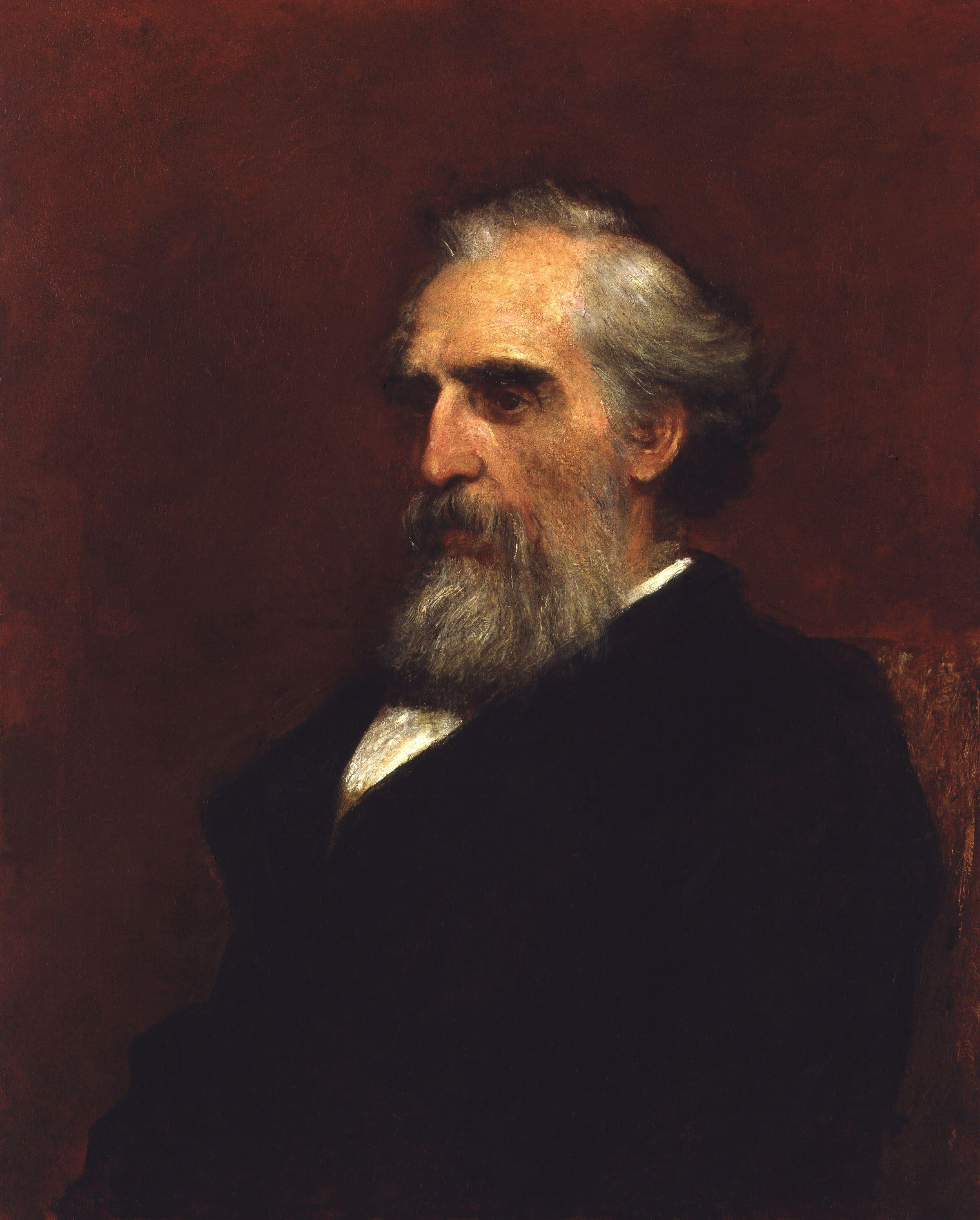
Passmore Edwards

The building was proposed by John Passmore Edwards, a journalist and philanthropist. His mother, Susan Passmore, was born in Newton Abbot and lived there until the age of 10. In 1901 Passmore Edwards proposed to erect a library in the town in memory of his mother, with the condition that the Newton Abbot Urban District Council adopt the measures outlined in the Public Libraries Act 1850. The building was approved and a design was commissioned from Cornish architect Silvanus Trevail, completed after his 1903 death by his assistant Alfred Cornelius. The style is in keeping with other libraries designed by Trevail for Passmore Edwards. Trevail's original design included a clock tower but this was not taken forward.

The library was erected on a site at the junction of Bank Street and Market Street known as Harvey's Corner that had previously been acquired by Devon County Council to allow for improvements to the adjacent highways. The commencement of work on the building was timed around the Coronation of Edward VII and Alexandra and the ceremonial laying of the foundation stone took place on 26 June 1902, the day originally intended for the coronation (because of the king's illness the actual coronation was postponed until August). The library was completed in 1904 at the cost of £2,290, Passmore Edwards' total donation of £2,500 may have included an allowance for fixtures, fittings and books. The building included space for a technical school, paid for by the County Council. The building was formally opened in September 1904 by the Lord-Lieutenant of Devon, Hugh Fortescue, Viscount Ebrington.

The building was granted statutory protection as a grade II listed building on 22 March 1983. It was subject to an extensive restoration between 2010 and 2012 and is now known as the Passmore Edwards Centre. The building remains in use as a library and in 2023 events were held there to commemorate the 200th anniversary of Passmore Edwards' birth.
