= Silvanus Trevail =

English architect

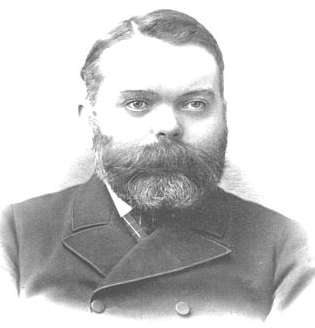
- Born: 11 November 1851; Luxulyan, Cornwall
- Died: 7 November 1903 (aged 52); Brownqueen Tunnel, Cornwall
- Occupation: Architect
- Buildings: Carbis Bay Hotel; Headland Hotel; Housel Bay Hotel; King Arthur's Castle Hotel; St Lawrence's Hospital; Great Western Hotel (Newquay)

Silvanus Trevail FRIBA JP (11 November 1851 – 7 November 1903) was a British architect, and the most prominent Cornish architect of the 19th century.

== Early life ==
Trevail was born at Carne Farm, Trethurgy, in the parish of Luxulyan, Cornwall on 11 November 1851. He was the son of John Trevail (1820-1902) and Jane (1822-1902). The oldest of four children, only his sister Laura (1858-1913) survived into adulthood.

He was baptised on 11 January 1852 in Luxulyan parish church.

== Career ==
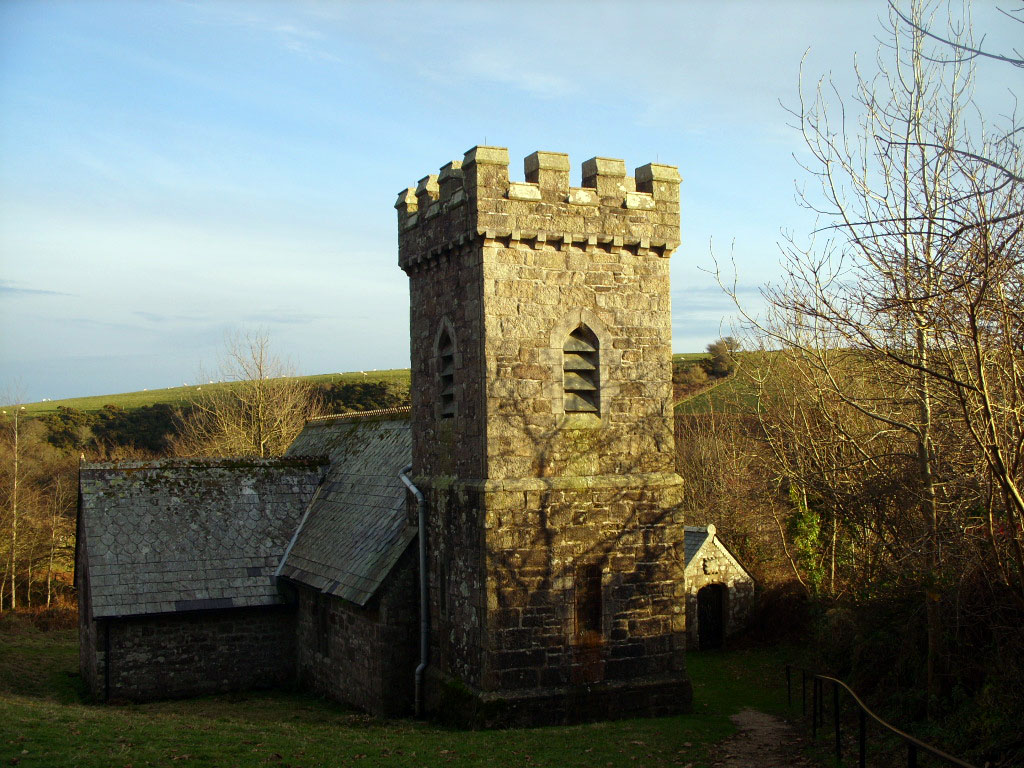
Trevail rebuilt the derelict Temple Church in 1883

He studied at Ledrah House, St Austell with H.H. Drake from 1864 to 1868 before moving to London to continue his studies at 11 King's Road, Bedford Row possibly with Henry Bayly Garling.

He started independent practice in St Blazey, Cornwall in 1871 and in 1880 moved his business to Truro. He rose to become Mayor of Truro in 1894 and, nationally, President of the architects' professional body, the Society of Architects in 1901, a position he held until his death in 1903.

He was appointed a Fellow of the Royal Institute of British Architects in 1893.

He was Cornwall's most famous architect, certainly of the 19th century. Following the Elementary Education Act 1870 which created Board Schools, Trevail designed around fifty such schools throughout the county. He also designed hotels including the Headland Hotel, Newquay, Carbis Bay Hotel in Carbis Bay, and restored the church at Temple. He was said to be a man ahead of his time, a campaigner for sanitation improvements and an entrepreneur.

In the Buildings of England, Cornwall, by Nikolaus Pevsner and Peter Beacham his contribution is noted thus:

[Trevail] undertook over 300 commissions between 1870 and 1930. Like his local contemporaries he was extraodinarily versatile, capable of working over the entire functional and stylistic range, but Trevail was among the most inventive. Most towns [in Cornwall] have a Trevail building – a bank, shop, school, technical college, Passmore Edwards library or institute, hospital, hotel or housing. As an entrepreneur willing to risk funding his own development he played a major role in the late C19 development of the Cornish tourist industry, seeing it as having an important potential role in the reinvigoration of the Cornish economy. Though his dreams of a string of large hotels around the coast linked by the railway remained unfulfilled, his King Arthur’s Castle Hotel at Tintagel and the Atlantic and Headland Hotels at Newquay are memorable for the way they take full advantage of their romanitc sites, their monumental scale, and their accomplished architecture inside and out.

== Selected works ==
- St Austell Central Schools 1873
- Mount Charles Wesleyan Chapel, St Austell 1873
- Board School, North Petherwin 1875
- Primitive Methodist Chapel, Par 1875
- Board Schools, Padstow 1876
- Linkinhorne Board School, Upton Cross 1876
- St Mawgan School, St Mawgan-in-Pydar 1876 (extension)
- St Merryn’s School, Padstow 1876
- School and Schoolmaster’s Houses, St Endellion 1877
- Delabole County Primary School, High Street, Delabole 1878
- St Teath County Primary School, North Road, St Teath 1878
- Great Western Hotel (Newquay) 1879
- Board Schools, Oxford Street, Plymouth 1880
- Corn Exchange, Post Office, Private Shop, Boscawen Street, Truro 1881
- Wadebridge Boys’ School 1881
- Pentowan, Newquay (house) 1881
- Wesley Chapel, Redruth 1881 (re-seating and renovations)
- St Ives Board Schools 1881
- Penzance School of Art 1880-81
- Trevissome, Falmouth 1881 (renovations and extensions)
- Congregational Chapel, Mevagissey 1883
- Temple Church, Bodmin 1883 (re-building from ruins
- Post Office, Par 1884 (additions)
- Stationmaster’s House, Par 1884
- House, Treator, Padstow 1884 (for William M. Richards, late of Naval Bank, Devonport)
- House, Polzeath, St. Minver 1884 (for Surgeon-Major Rendell, late of the Indian Army)
- Wesleyan Chapel, Edgcumb, Wendron 1885
- New Post Office, King Street/High Cross, Truro 1885
- St Piran’s R.C. Church and Presbytery, Truro 1885
- St Mary’s Wesleyan School, Union Place, Truro 1887
- Tregaddick, Blisland, Bodmin 1886 (house for Sir Warwick Morshead)
- St Paul’s Church, Upton Cross 1887
- Vicarage, Perranzabuloe 1887
- Congregational Church, Newquay 1888
- Two shops, 8 & 10 Prince’s Street, Truro 1889 (for Mr. Polkinhorn)
- Red Lion Hotel, Truro 1889 (additions)
- Business Premises for Arthur Laverton, River Street, Truro 1889
- Public Baths, St Mary’s Street, Truro 1889
- Liberal Club, Fore Street, St Austell 1889
- Cornish Banking Company, Megeage Street, Helston 1889
- Office of the Mayor, 73 Lemon Street, Truro 1889 (renovation and alteration)
- Farm house and buildings, Trenowth, Grampound Road 1890 (for Robert Harvey Esq. J.P.)
- Business premises for Clemens and Tippett, River Street, Truro 1890
- Shop for Edward Burton, 25 King Street, Truro 1890
- Devon and Cornwall Banking Company, Boscawen Street/Lemon Street, Truro 1890-92
- Public Rooms, Trevenson Street, Camborne 1891
- Cornish Bank, 36 and 38 Fore Street, St. Columb Major 1891
- Tredethy Country House Hotel, St Mabyn 1892 (alterations)
- Treloyhan, Tregenna Castle, St Ives 1892 (house for Mr. E. Hain).
- Board School, St Mawes 1892
- Atlantic Hotel, Newquay 1892
- Pendennis Hotel, Falmouth 1892-93
- St Catherine’s Church, Blisland 1892-93 (restoration)
- Princes House, Princes Street, Truro 1893 (addition of porch, steps and boundary wall)
- Passmore Edwards Institute, Hayle 1893-96
- Cornish Bank Limited, Newquay 1894
- Passmore Edwards Free Library, Camborne 1894
- Carbis Bay Hotel, Carbis Bay 1894
- Housel Bay Hotel, The Lizard 1894
- Almshouses, Tregony Hill, Tregony 1895 (restoration)
- The Red Bank, Church Street, St Austell 1895
- Public Hall, Truro Road, St Austell 1896
- Trewince House, Gerrans 1897 (extended)
- King Arthur's Castle Hotel, Tintagel 1897
- Cornwall Central Technical Schools, Pydar Street, Truro 1897-98
- Isolation Hospital, County Asylum, Bodmin 1897-98
- Vivian Brothers (outfitters), Market Square, Camborne 1898
- Passmore Edwards Free Library, Plashet, East Ham, London 1898
- Passmore Edwards Free Library, Bodmin 1898
- Passmore Edwards Library Launceston 1898-99
- Ship and Castle Hotel, St Mawes 1899
- St Andrew's Mission Chapel, Charles Street, Truro 1899-1900
- Headland Hotel, Newquay 1900
- Devon and Cornwall Banking Company, Newquay 1900
- Bowring Library, Moretonhampstead, Devon 1901-02
- St Lawrence's Hospital, Bodmin 1901 (which was demolished between September 2013 and February 2014).
- Passmore Edwards Free Library, Market Street/Bank Street, Newton Abbot, Devon 1901-04
- Devon and Cornwall Bank, Fore Street, Fowey 1904-05

== Death ==
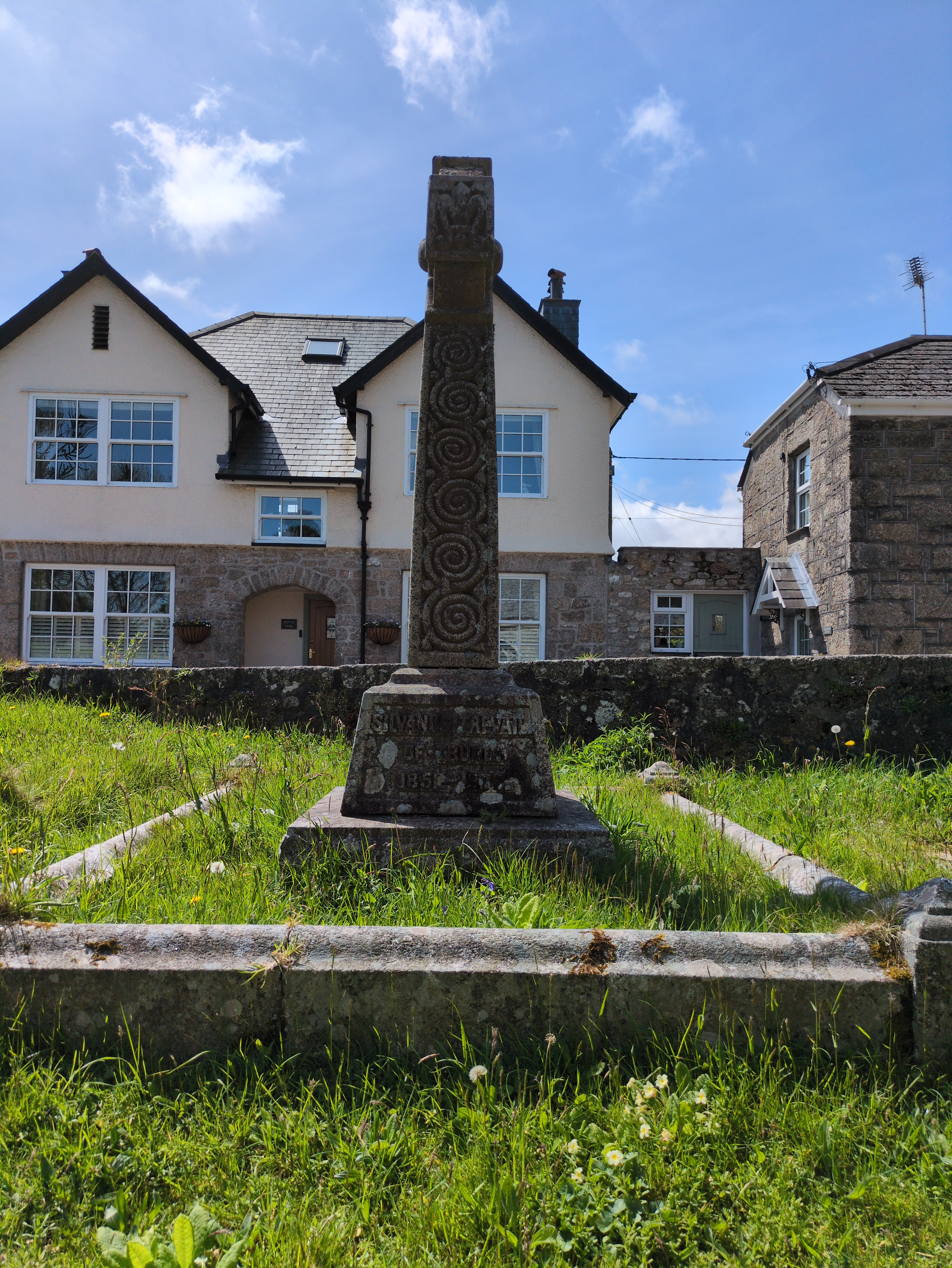
Trevail Monument In The Churchyard About 5 Metres South Of Porch Of Church Of St Ciricius And St Julitta, Luxulyan

His success however, did not bring him happiness. Trevail had a history of depression and had been unwell for some time before killing himself. On 7 November 1903 he shot himself in the lavatory of a train as it entered Brownqueen Tunnel a short distance from Bodmin Road railway station.

He left an estate valued at £6,908 (equivalent to £726,200 in 2025) to his sister, Laura Rundle of Trevollard, Lanreath. At the time of his death he was chairman of the Headland Hotel Company and King Arthur’s Castle Hotel Company, and a director of the Carbis Bay Hotel Company, and the Native Guano Company.

In St Ciricius and St Julitta's church, Luxulyan the east window was dedicated to him, and in the churchyard a memorial cross was erected.
