= Great Western Hotel, Newquay =

Hotel in Newquay, Cornwall

Great Western Hotel
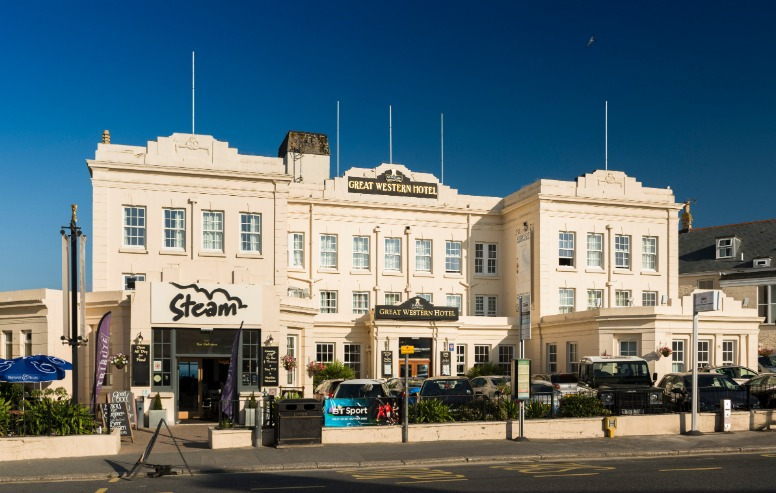
- Front of the hotel

- Location within Cornwall
- Alternative names: The Great Western

General information
- Location: Great Western Hotel, 36-37 Cliff Road, TR7 2NE, Newquay, Cornwall
- Coordinates: 50°24′59″N 5°04′31″W
- Named for: Great Western Railway
- Opened: 7 April 1879; 147 years ago
- Renovated: 2026 - 28 (phased)
- Owner: St Austell Brewery

Technical details
- Floor count: 3

Design and construction
- Architect: Silvanus Trevail

Other information
- Number of rooms: 66

Website
- https://www.greatwesternnewquay.co.uk/

Locally Listed Building
- Official name: Great Western Hotel
- Country: United Kingdom
- Authority: Cornwall Council

The Great Western Hotel is the oldest purpose-built hotel in Newquay, Cornwall. The hotel was originally designed by the Cornish architect Silvanus Trevail and first opened in April 1879. The hotel is built in a prominent position overlooking Great Western Beach.

The hotel has 66 rooms, some with sea-views.

== History ==
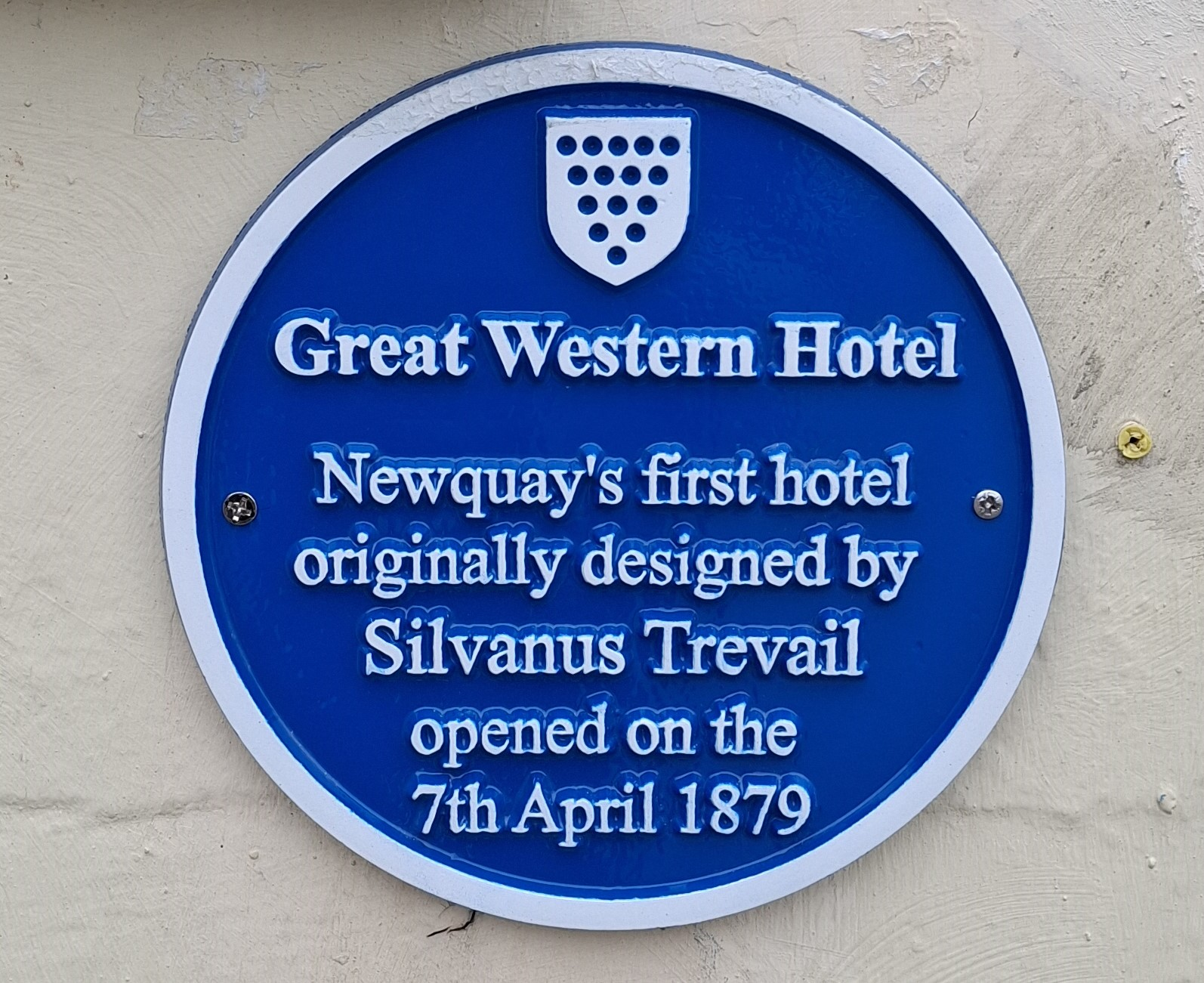
A commemorative plaque on the by the front entrance of the hotel

In December 1877, the local newspaper reported that the owner had commenced building the hotel, near Newquay railway station.

In January 1879 the hotel was completed and it officially opened on 7 April 1879. It was the first in a string of hotels designed to appeal to the renewed interest in Cornwall as a winter resort for the middle classes. The Great Western Railway was the principal shareholder in the owning company until c. 1920.

The Hotel is mentioned in Hartnoll's Illustrated Newquay Guide And Visitor's Hand-book in 1884:

The Great Western, near the station, a handsome, modern edifice, fitted with every convenience and luxury, and occupying a commanding position on the upper cliffs, with a magnificent sea view. The interior arrangements are of a very high order, and the visitor will find the establishment in no way inferior to first-class hotels in other watering-places. The proprietor and manager is Mr. G. R. Roberts.

On a tour of Cornwall in May 1926, The Prince of Wales, later Edward VIII, met the Duchy tenants at the hotel, and took tea with them in company with Sir Walter Peacock, Mr. Webster, Mr. Stainer, Duchy stewards.

In 2024, a commemorative plaque was unveiled to honor the building as Newquay's first hotel and its architect.

In April 2026, St Austell Brewery announced the completion of the first phase of refurbishment at the hotel. The project forms part of a wider multi-phase redevelopment aimed at modernising the historic hotel while preserving its heritage features.

== Architecture ==
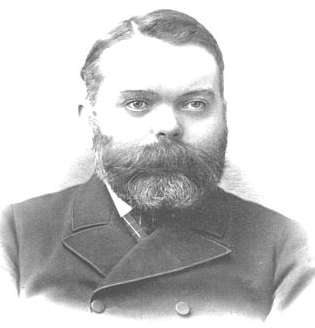
Cornish Architect Silvanus Trevail

The original 1879 building resembled a large country house with pitched roofs, gable ends and attic windows. In 1931 the original modest two storey gabled building was altered beyond recognition to the current symmetrical art-deco style building, consisting of three storeys with smooth external render, painted frontages, symmetrical sash windows and rusticated quoin detailing to corners.

The Hotel is recognised as a local historic building and is recorded on The Historic Environment Record of Cornwall.

== Great Western Beach ==
Before the railway came to Newquay in 1876, the beach was known as Bothwick Sands. It was not until the Great Western Hotel was built in 1879, (overlooking the beach) that it gradually became known as Great Western Beach, although on many Ordnance Survey maps and holiday guides until the 1960s both names were mentioned. Despite the name being linked to the hotel, the beach is a public amenity.
