= Atlantic Hotel, Newquay =

Hotel in Newquay, Cornwall, England

The Atlantic Hotel
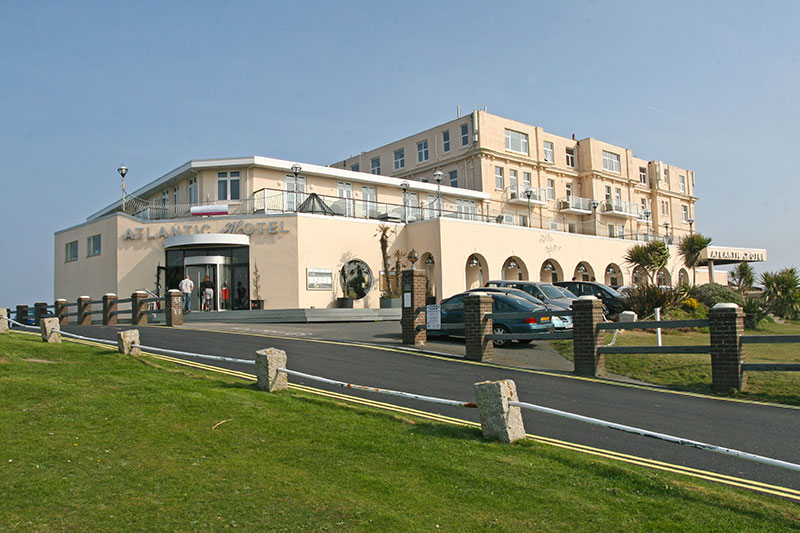

- Location within Cornwall
- Alternative names: The Atlantic
- Hotel chain: The Cornwall Hotel Collection

General information
- Architectural style: Victorian Architecture
- Location: Atlantic Hotel; Dane Road, Newquay TR7 1EN, Newquay
- Coordinates: 50°25′14″N 5°5′49″W
- Construction started: 1891
- Completed: 1892
- Opened: July 1892
- Owner: The Cornwall Hotel Collection

Technical details
- Floor count: 4

Design and construction
- Architect: Silvanus Trevail

Other information
- Number of rooms: 57

Website
- https://atlantichotelnewquay.co.uk/

The Atlantic Hotel is in Newquay, Cornwall, United Kingdom. It was first opened in July 1892 and occupies a prominent position on the shore, with views of the Atlantic Ocean & the North Cornish coast.

The hotel has 57 bedrooms.

== History ==
The Atlantic Hotel was designed by the Cornish architect Silvanus Trevail.

In 1890, Trevail formed the Cornish Hotels Company. His aim was to build several large first class hotels in key locations, such as Falmouth, Newquay, St Ives and Kynance, to accommodate the large number of tourists and visitors traveling to Cornwall by the improved Great Western Railway passenger service. In June 1891 the Cornish Hotels Company proposed to the Newquay Board that a new hotel was needed for the town. In October 1891, Trevail attended the Cornwall licensing committee on behalf of the company to obtain a provisional licence which was granted for the Atlantic Hotel. His plans were approved and the builders, Lang and Son, undertook construction work on the hotel. The Hotel opened to guests in July 1892, as a property occupying 10 acres of land. The opening was a success but there were problems. An outbreak of scarlet fever threatened to scare off visitors coming to Newquay and furthermore a local water shortage caused issues with the Atlantic Hotel's state of the art sanitary facilities. The Newquay board described the hotel as being in a remarkable position, having been built on the summit of a bold headland jutting out into Newquay Bay, with the Atlantic Ocean surrounding three of its four sides. It had views along the coast and could be seen for miles before visitors reached the town.

In the Second World War it was among a number of hotels in Newquay that were requisitioned by the military for use as a convalescent hospital.

The Hotel has been considerably modified during the 20th century and has lost a lot of its original architectural qualities (mainly to the exterior), however much of the interior still contains original features such as the grand staircase and the marble columns.

In March 2026, The Atlantic Hotel was sold to The Cornwall Hotel Collection following a period in which the property had been placed on the market after long-term family ownership. The sale was reported as securing the future of the historic hotel. The new owners announced plans for a phased programme of refurbishment and restoration.

=== The Beatles ===
During filming for the Magical Mystery Tour, The Beatles arrived in Newquay on Tuesday, 12 September 1967 and stayed at the Atlantic Hotel, which caused a sensation around the town as The Beatles were the most famous band in the world at the time, following the success of their Sergeant Pepper album. The scene they filmed at the hotel was of a bikini-clad girl, who was chased around the hotel's swimming pool.

The Beatles had only intended to stay at the hotel for just one night but eventually decided to use the hotel as a base for three nights. The band stayed in four luxury holiday flats adjoining the hotel and needed a police cordon to have their meals in the hotel dining room.
