= Temple, Cornwall =

Village in Cornwall, England

Coordinates: 50.5302°N 4.6178°W

Temple: Cornish: Tempel
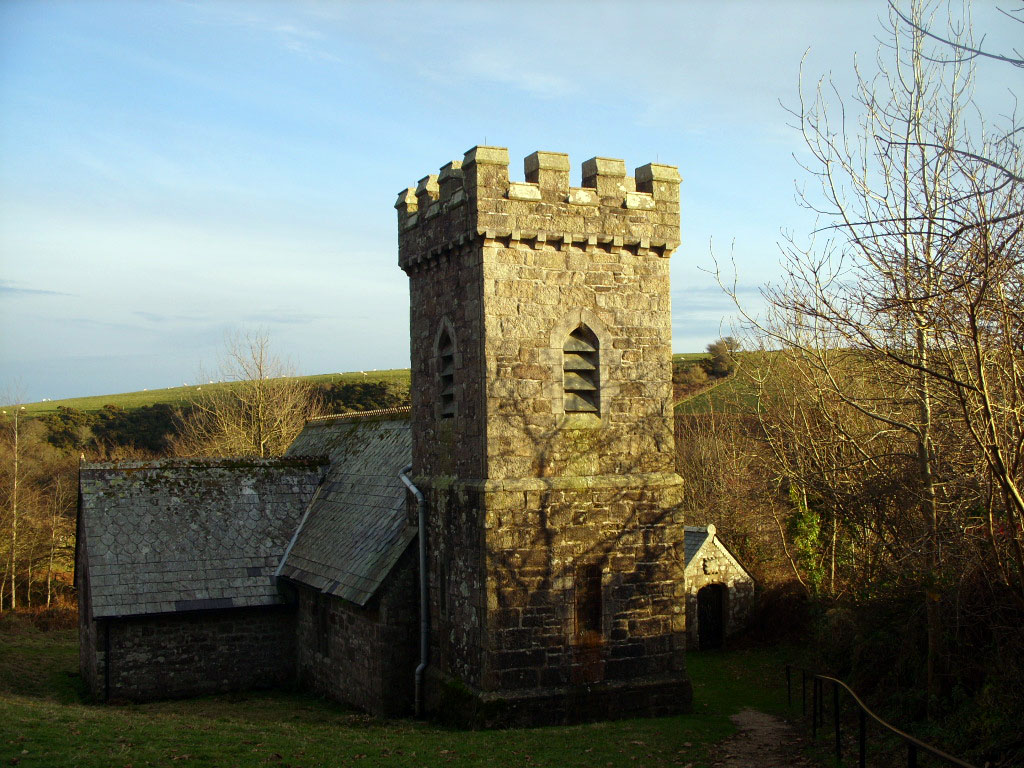
- Temple Church

- Location within Cornwall
- OS grid reference: SX146733
- Civil parish: Blisland
- Unitary authority: Cornwall
- Ceremonial county: Cornwall
- Region: South West
- Country: England
- Sovereign state: United Kingdom
- Post town: BODMIN
- Postcode district: PL30
- Dialling code: 01208
- Police: Devon and Cornwall
- Fire: Cornwall
- Ambulance: South Western
- UK Parliament: North Cornwall

Temple (Cornish: Tempel) is a small village and former civil parish, now in the parish of Blisland, on Bodmin Moor, in the Cornwall district, in the ceremonial county of Cornwall, England. The village is bypassed by the A30 road. In 1931 the parish had a population of 29.

== History and antiquities ==
Temple derives its name from the hospice or preceptory founded by the Knights Templars who built a refuge for pilgrims and travellers, en route to the Holy Land, in the 12th century. On the suppression of the Templars it passed into the hands of the Knights Hospitallers (in 1314), who held it until the religious houses were suppressed by Henry VIII. In 1901 it was a curacy of Warleggan and on 1 April 1934, the parish of Temple was incorporated into Blisland parish.

=== Church ===
Temple Church is a Grade II* listed building built c.1120 on land owned by the Knights Templar. It became famous as a place where marriages could be performed without banns or licence (similar to Gretna Green until the early 20th century). This came to an end in 1744 when the church first came under episcopal jurisdiction. By the mid-19th century, it had become a ruin and a final service was held on 29 January 1882, in front of a ″large congregation″ led by the Reverend J Brown. It was rebuilt (by Silvanus Trevail) in the following year. The church is dedicated to St Catherine.

The church contains several references to its links with the Knights Templar, including a cross pattée in the east window and a depiction of a mounted knight in the north window of the church tower.

=== Crosses ===
Arthur Langdon (1896) recorded the existence of eight stone crosses in the parish, including two cross slabs, all in the churchyard. Several of these crosses were subsequently incorporated into a stone outbuilding on the south side of the church.

=== Gallery ===
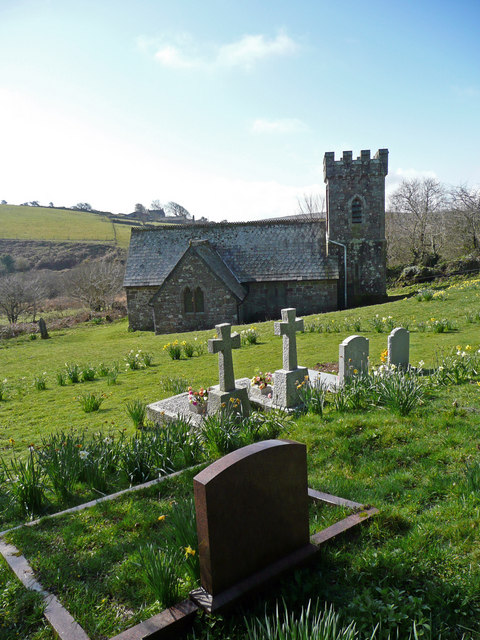
St Catherine's Church and churchyard

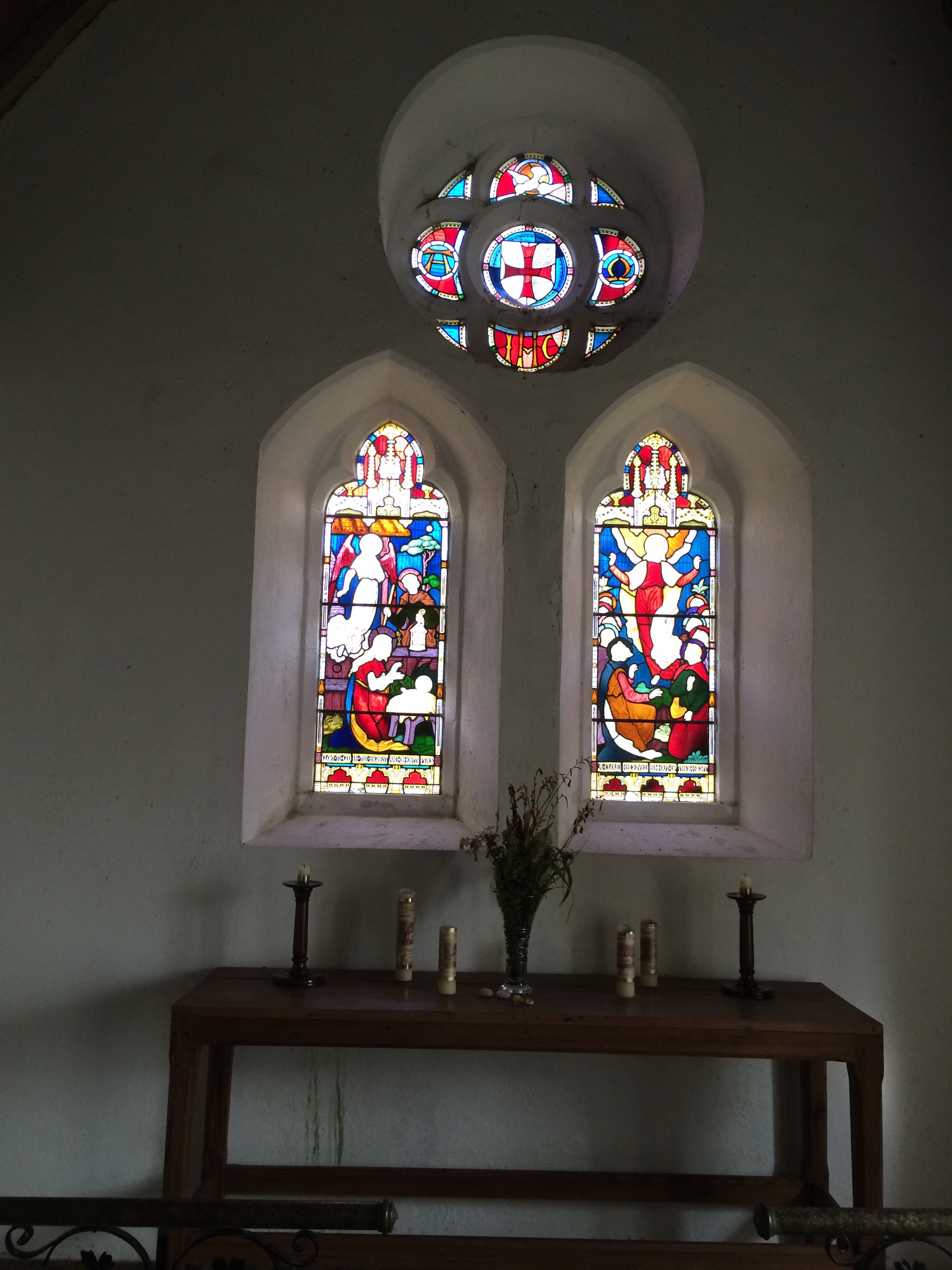
East window showing the cross pattée of the Knights Templar

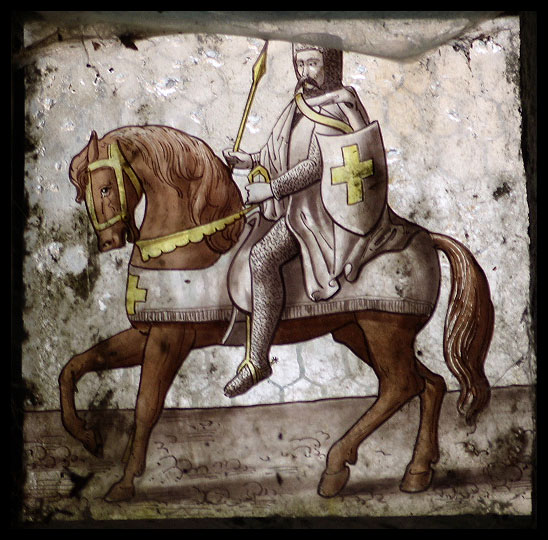
Detail of stained glass window in the church tower showing a mounted knight

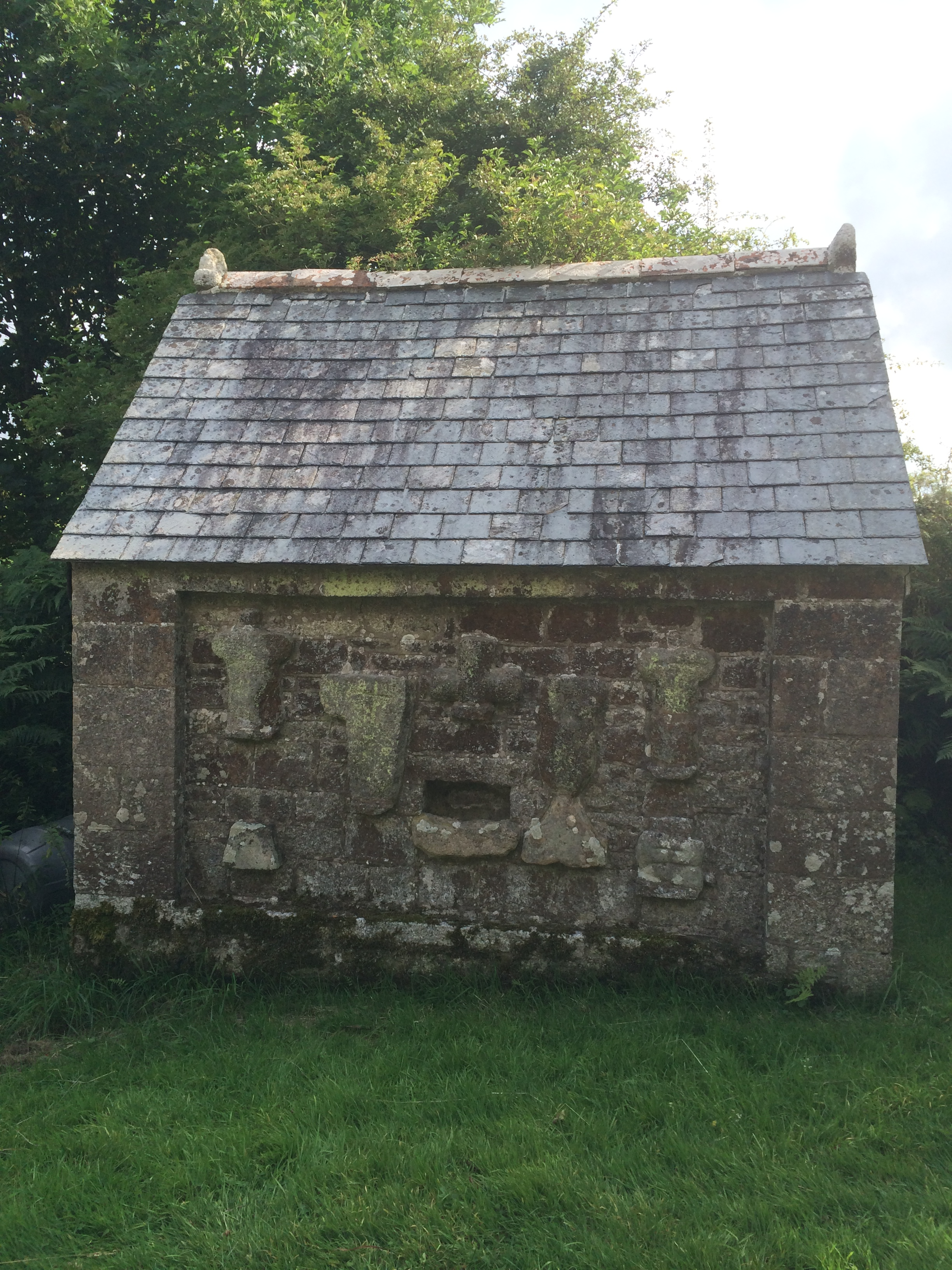
Stone outbuilding incorporating early stone crosses

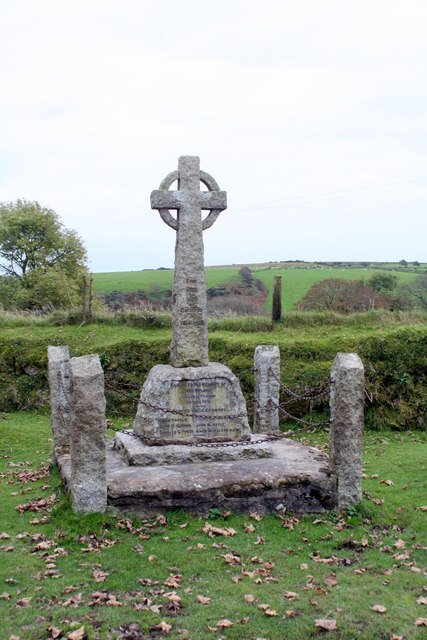
Temple war memorial

== See also ==
- Templars Preceptory
