= Paul Drayton =

Paul Drayton may refer to:

- Paul Drayton (athlete) (1939–2010), American athlete
- Paul Drayton (composer) (born 1944), British musician
- Paul Drayton (mason), influential leader of the National Grand Lodge for whom various lodges are named
