= Zennor Head =

Headland on the north coast of Cornwall

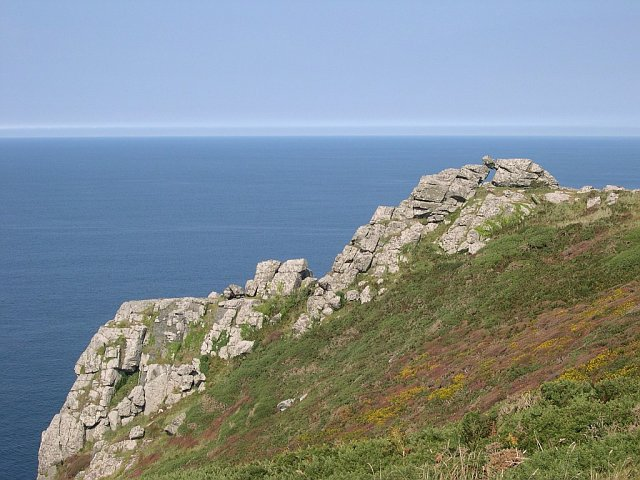
- Zennor Head, looking north
- Interactive map of Zennor Head
- Type: Promontory
- Location: Cornwall
- Nearest city: Zennor
- Coordinates: 50.198°N 5.574°W
- Etymology: Saint Senara
- Operator: National Trust

Zennor Head /ˈzɛnʊər hɛd/ is a 750-metre (2,460 ft) long promontory on the Cornish coast between Pendour Cove and Porthzennor Cove. Facing the Atlantic Ocean, it lies 1 kilometre north-west of the village of Zennor and 1.6 kilometres east of the next promontory, Gurnard's Head. The granite (Killas) cliffs rise over 200 feet (60 m) from the sea and the highest point of the headland is 314 feet (96 m) above sea level, with an Ordnance Survey triangulation station. Zennor Head is on the South West Coast Path, which follows the cliff edge closely, skirting the entire perimeter of the headland. The promontory is part of the Penwith Heritage Coast, and is the largest coastal feature in the United Kingdom that begins with the letter "Z". It gets its name from a local saint, Senara. Zennor Head was mined for copper and tin in the Victorian Era. There is no longer any residential or commercial occupancy on the headland, but it is occupied by a variety of coastal animals and plants, such as kestrels and gorse.

== Etymology ==
The name "Zennor Head" originates from the name of a local saint, Senara. According to local legend, Senara was thrown off a headland in Brittany in a barrel after being falsely accused of adultery by her husband and washed up on the Cornish coast, founding Zennor and giving her name to the eponymous village (and subsequently Zennor Head, Zennor Quoit and Porthzennor Cove), before continuing to Ireland. The "s" changed to a "z", an occurrence common in the West Country but rare elsewhere, and as such is the largest coastal feature in the United Kingdom to begin with the letter "Z".

== History ==
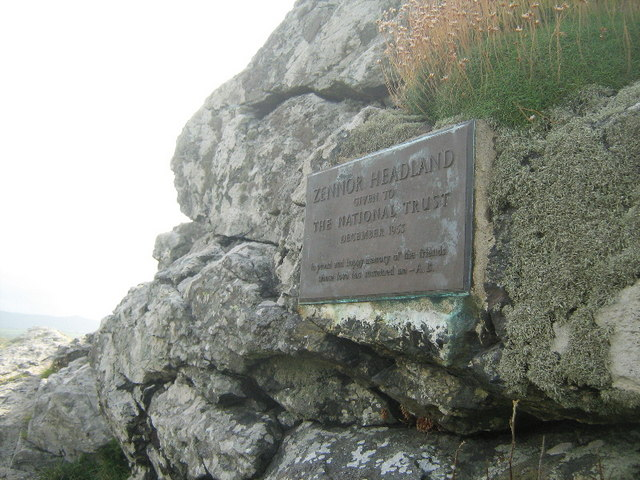
Plaque commemorating donation to the National Trust

The headland is bordered by Cornish granite hedges, and the farming system dates from about 4000 BC, the time of the Bronze Age in Cornwall. The surrounding area and village of Zennor has been continually occupied for over 4,000 years. Zennor Head was mined extensively for copper and tin in the 19th century, and drainage adits remain visible on the eastern side.

The promontory was donated to the National Trust in December 1953. The Southwest Coast Path was created in 1978, and runs along the top of Zennor Head as part of its 630 miles (1,010 km), following the edge of the cliffs closely. Zennor in Darkness, the 1994 McKitterick Prize-winning novel by Helen Dunmore, was partly set around Zennor Head. In 2009 the headland suffered flooding which affected the cliff-top footpath. The promontory has been designated as part of the Penwith Heritage Coast.

== Geography and geology ==
Zennor Head is located on the north coast of Cornwall, England, facing the Atlantic Ocean. A headland extending some 750 metres (2,460 ft), it is surrounded by steep cliffs plunging into the sea below. It is west of the town of St Ives, and north-east of the town of Penzance. The nearest human settlement is the village of Zennor, and the headland is flanked by two coves, Pendour and Porthzennor. The nearest headland is Gurnard's Head, 1.6 kilometres to the west. Access is from the South West Coast Path, or the B3306 road (West Cornwall coast road). There is a deep inlet known as Horseback Zawn on the western side, where seabirds nest. The headland is topped by an Ordnance Survey "Trig Point". The Killas strata, which is exposed over the majority of Zennor Head, is a sedimentary rock formation laid down in the Devonian period, between approximately 415 and 375 million years ago (myr). Zennor Head is on the surface boundary of the so-called "Land's End Granite", part of the Cornubian batholith which dates from 279 to 274 myr. However, the intrusion of the granite into the Killas strata altered it metamorphically into a shale-type rock.

== Fauna and Flora ==
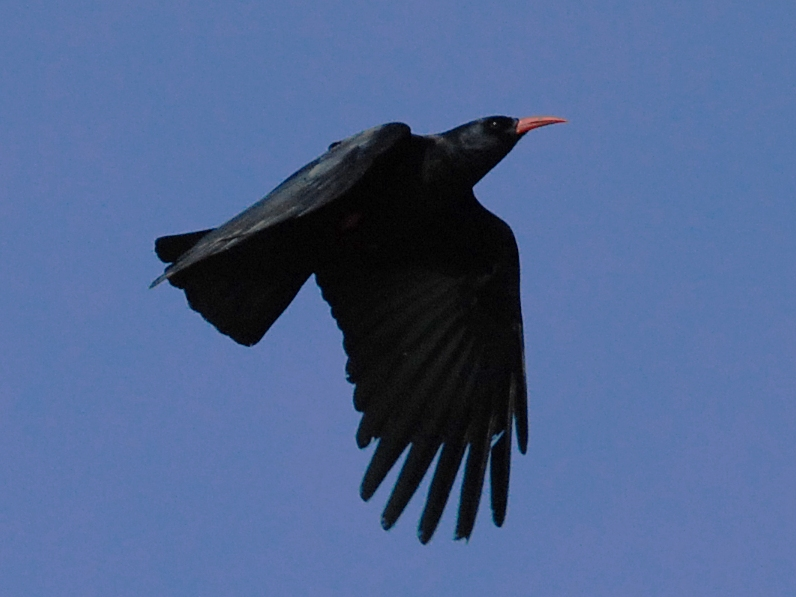
Cornish chough (P. p. pyrrhocorax) flying in Penwith

Zennor Head is home to a variety of wildlife, including the Cornish chough (Pyrrhocorax pyrrhocorax pyrrhocorax). Grey seals (Halichoerus grypus) have been sighted off the coast. Many seabirds nest on the cliffs, especially around Horseback Zawn, including herring gulls (Larus argentatus) and fulmars (Fulmarus glacialis). Kestrels (Falco tinnunculus) hunt inland of the shoreline.

The headland is primarily covered with grass, as well as heather (Calluna vulgaris), bracken (Pteridium aquilinum), thyme (Thymus polytrichus) and western gorse (Ulex gallii). In 1962, specimens of the comparatively rare western clover (Trifolium occidentale) were found on Zennor Head. The lichen Dirina massiliensis has also been found high on the acid schist cliffs on the north-, seaward-side of the headland. The parasitic plant dodder (Cuscuta epithymum) is found growing on gorse. There are also typical coastal flowering plants such as kidney vetch (Anthyllis vulneraria), sea campion (Silene uniflora), and thrift (Armeria maritima).

== Gallery ==
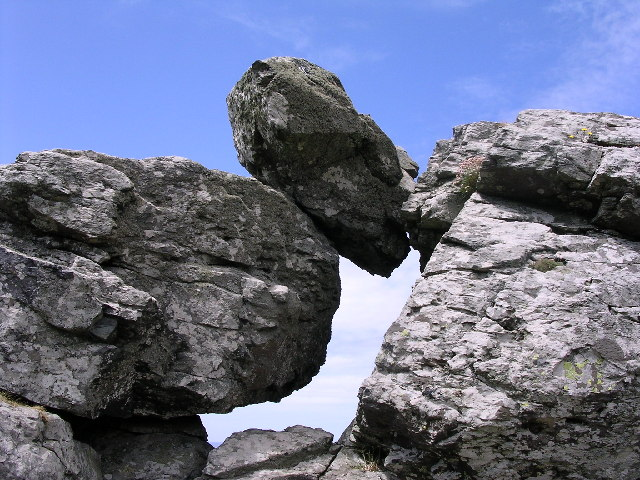
Perched rock at the foot of Zennor Head

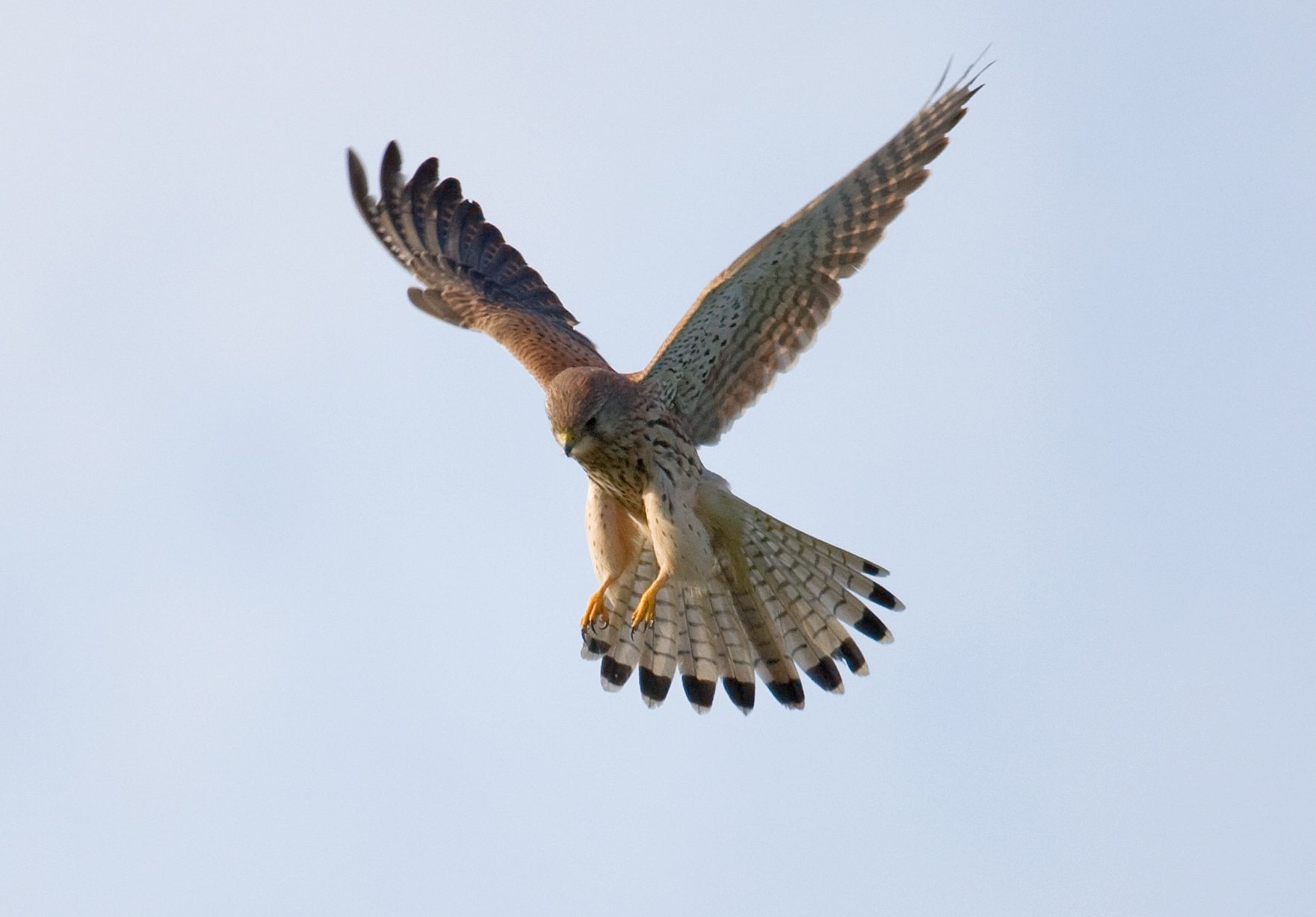
Common kestrel

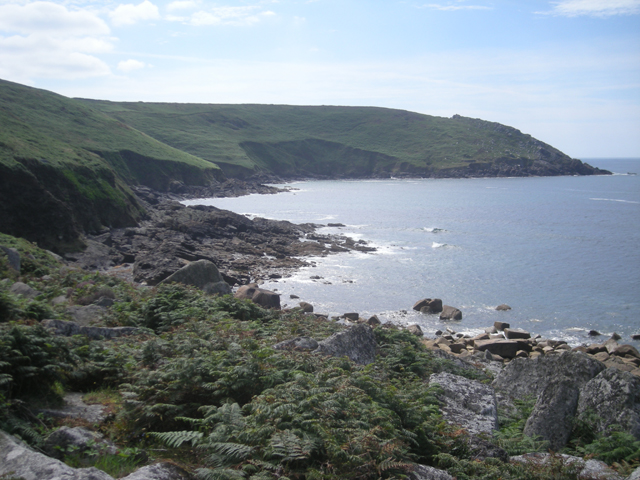
Eastern flank

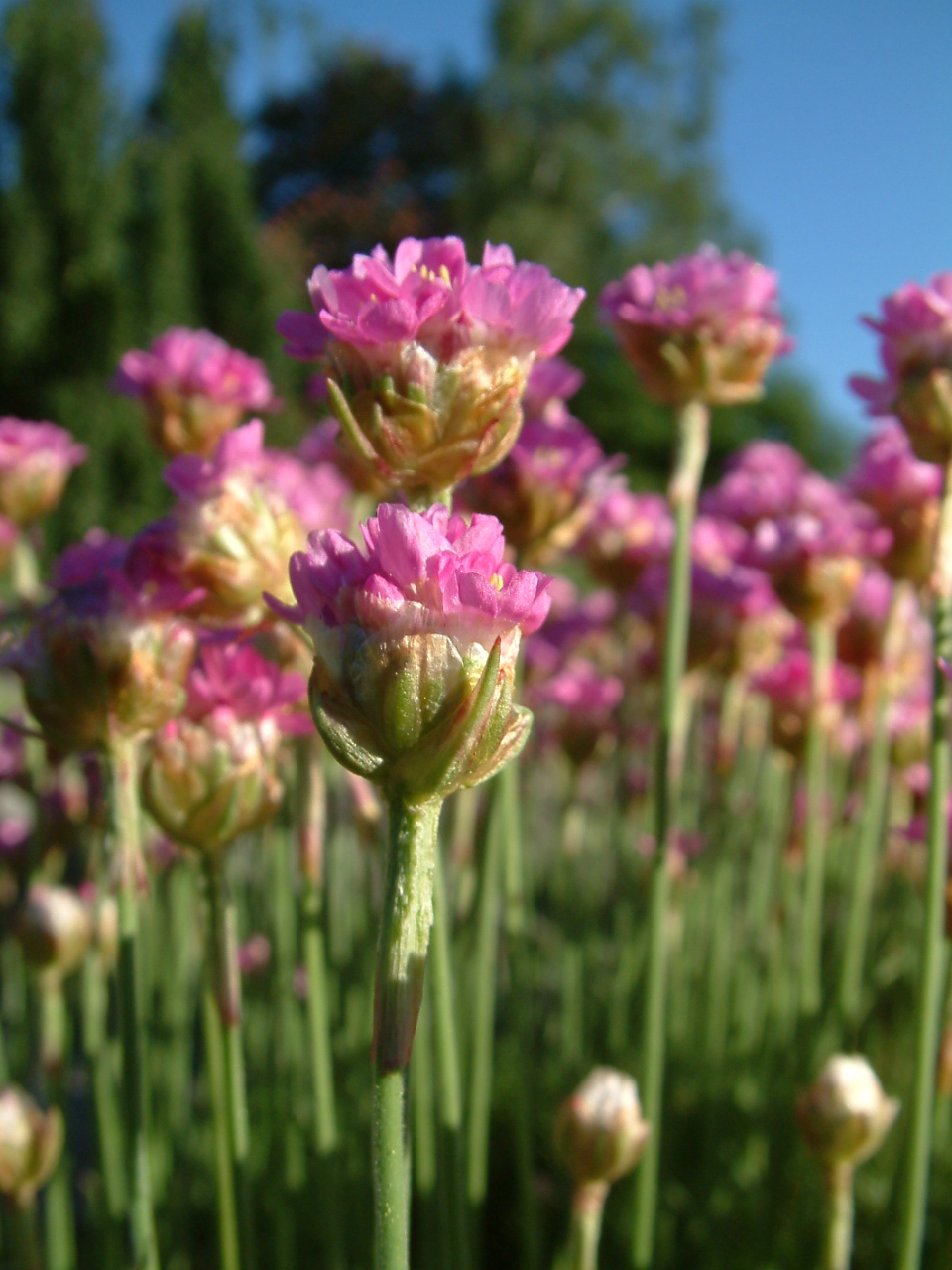
Thrift, a coastal plant

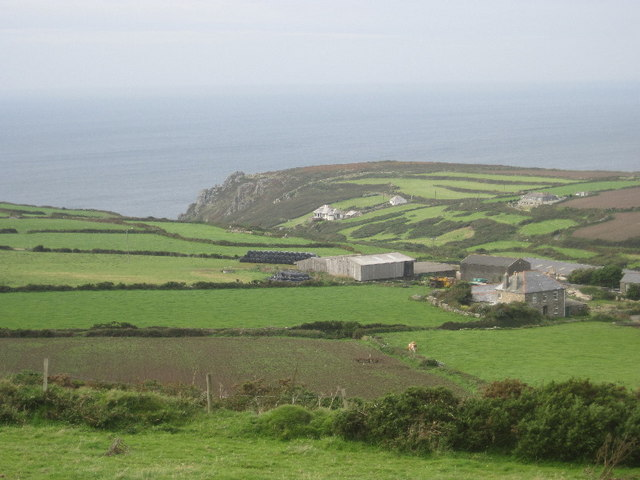
Zennor Head from inland

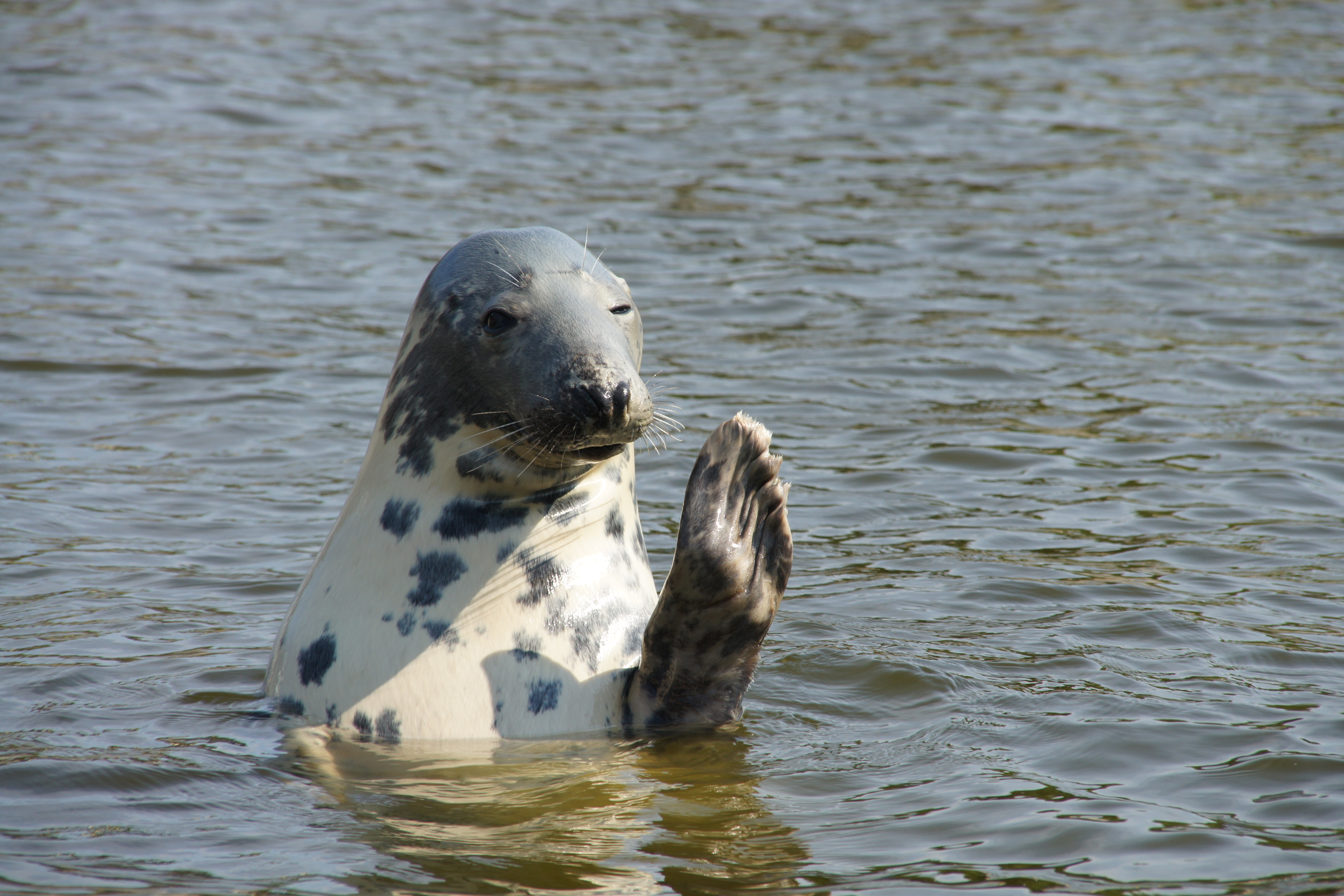
Grey seal

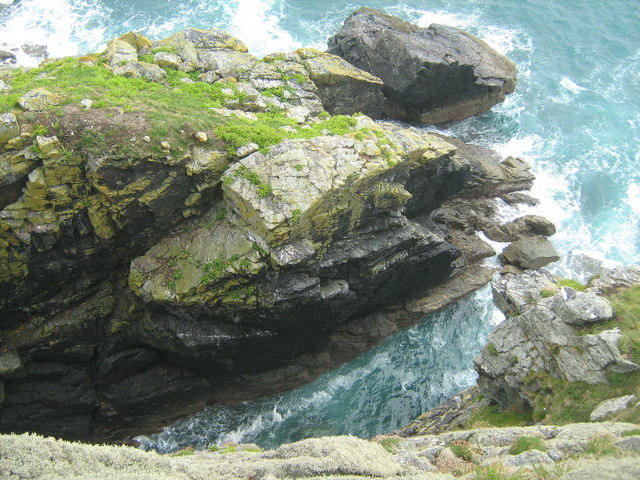
Horseback Zawn
