= Saint Senara =

Legendary Cornish saint

- Born: Breton
- Died: Pendour Cove, Cornwall
- Venerated in: Anglican Communion; Catholic Church (Folk Catholicism)
- Major shrine: St Senara's Church, Zennor
- Feast: 1 May
- Attributes: Pregnant woman in a barrel in the middle of the sea
- Patronage: Zennor

Saint Senara, also known as Asenora, Sinara, or Sennara, is a legendary Cornish saint with links to the village of Zennor on the north coast of Cornwall, UK. St Senara's Church, Zennor is dedicated to her, and according to legend her name inspired the name of the village of Zennor along with local features like Zennor Head and Zennor Quoit.

== Historical records ==
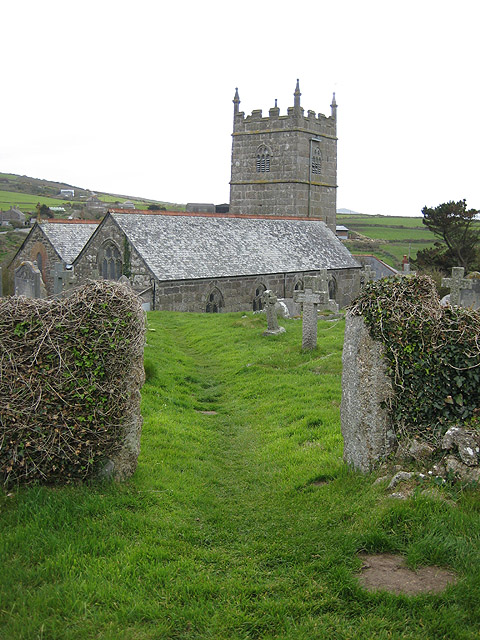
St Senara's Church in Zennor

Nicholas Orme, in his commentary on Nicholas Roscarrock's (c. 1548–1634) Lives of the Saints notes that a male Sanctus Sinar of Zennor was recorded in 1170, and in 1235 as a female Sancta Sinara; since 1235, this saint has been identified as female. Nothing else is known about her, unless she is identified with Azenor, the mother of Saint Budoc. Orme also notes the similarity to Saint Senan at Sennen, another saint of the Penwith peninsula.

== Legend ==
According to a 1907 source, Saint Senara was a widow and her feast day is celebrated on May 1. She is frequently connected to Azenor, mother of Saint Budoc.

According to versions of the story which identify her with Azenor, Senara or Asenora was a Breton princess of Brest. Her husband, a Breton king, wrongly accused her of adultery and threw her into the sea in a barrel while pregnant. She was visited by an angel whilst floating in the sea off the westernmost end of Cornwall, and gave birth to a son in the waves, who later became Saint Budoc or an Irish bishop. She was washed up on the Cornish coast, where she founded Zennor before continuing to Ireland.

Due to the striking similarity, the legend's origins possibly lie in Greek mythology and the story of Danaë who was also cast to sea with her son Perseus in a wooden box.

== Legacy ==
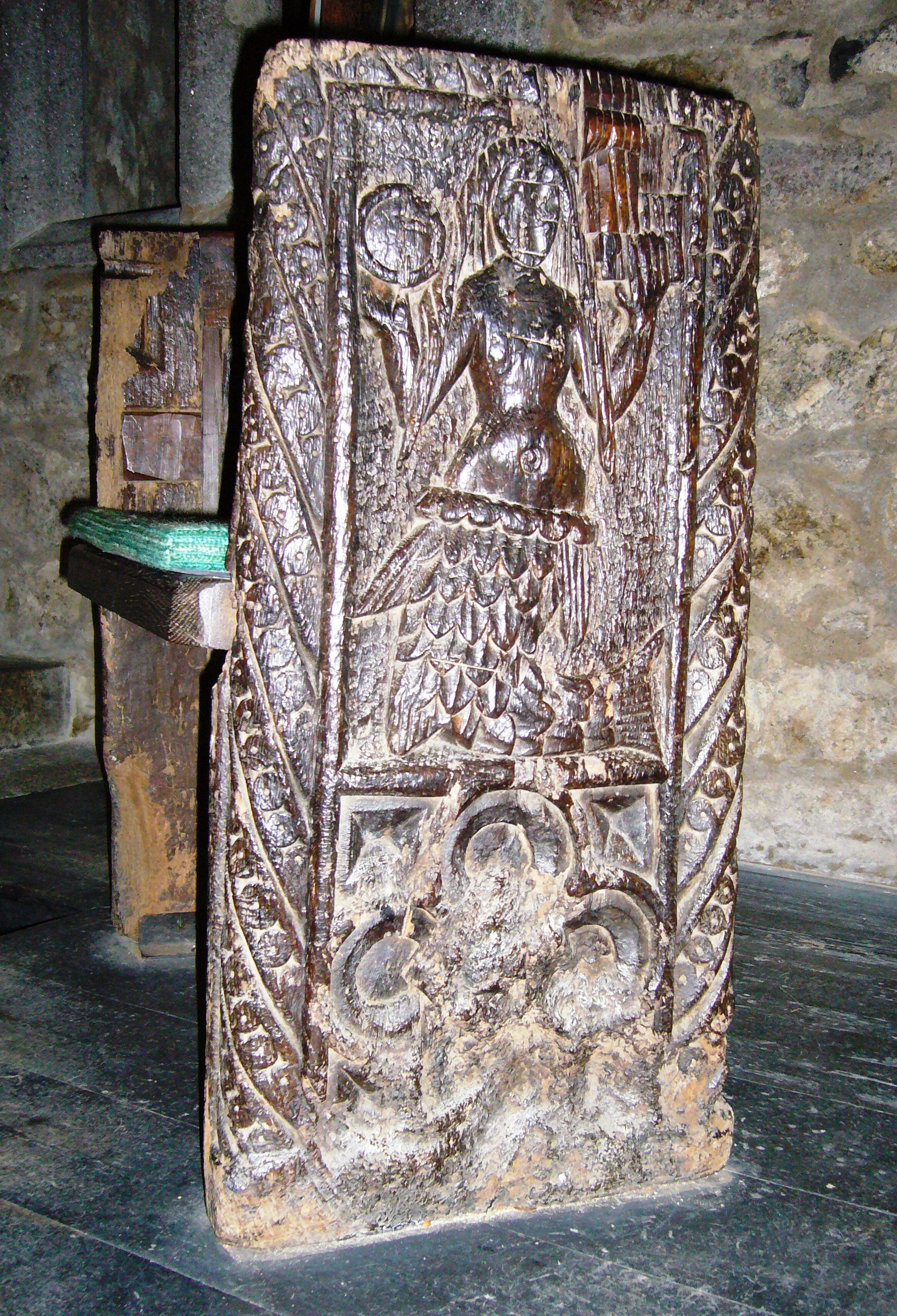
The "mermaid chair" in Zennor church

She gives her name to St Senara's Church in Zennor. A statue of St Senara lies in an enclosed garden next to the church. There has been a church at this site since at least the 6th century AD, but the current building was constructed in the 13th and partly the 15th century.

The church contains the Mermaid Chair, an ancient chair with carvings of fish on the seat and a mermaid admiring herself in a mirror on the pew end. It is believed to be at least 600 years old. The mermaid was highly venerated by local fishermen and is said to represent the dual nature of Christ (human and divine).

== Modern adaptations ==
Sue Monk Kidd's The Mermaid Chair links the legend of St. Senara to that of the Mermaid of Zennor. In Kidd's reimagining of the myths, Senara was originally a mermaid named Asenora who would remove her fish tail to walk on land. An abbot stole and hid the fish tail, allowing Asenora to be tamed and converted. Characters attribute the story to Legenda Aurea: Readings on the Saints, but although this is the title of an actual reference work, no such story appears in the real-life work. The Mermaid Chair of Kidd's book is much more ornate and bejeweled than the real-life artifact which inspired it, with the arms consisting of carved, winged mermaids. The book was adapted into a movie in 2006.
