= Tinner's Arms =

Pub in Zennor, Cornwall, England

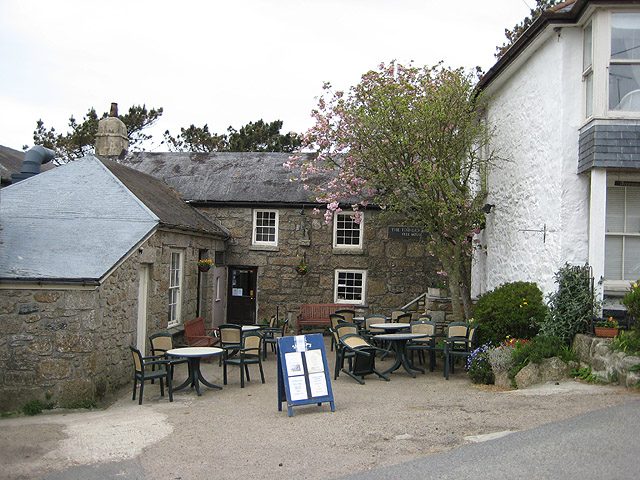

- Location within Southwest Cornwall

General information
- Location: Zennor, Cornwall, England
- Coordinates: 50°11′29″N 5°34′7″W
- Completed: 1271

The Tinner's Arms is a Grade II-listed traditional Cornish pub in Zennor, Cornwall. The name is derived from the Tinners, with records of tin extraction in the area dating back to Tudor times. D. H. Lawrence stayed for a fortnight in the pub in 1916. The pub sign pictures a tin miner at work, testimony to its origins. It is the only pub in the village.

== Architecture ==
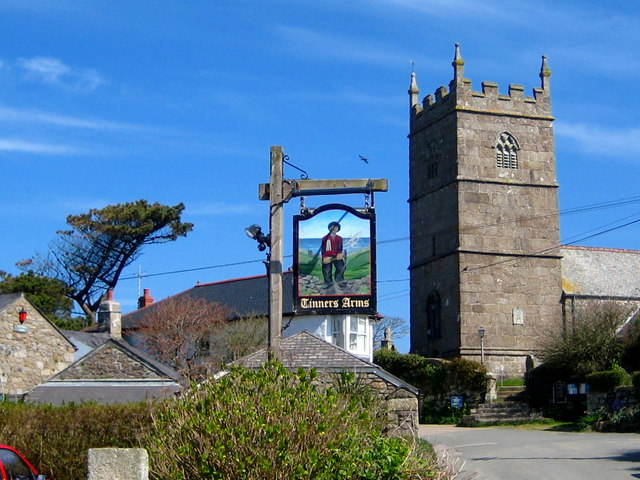
The pub sign against the church

It is located opposite St Senara's Church and was supposedly originally built in 1271 to house the masons building the church. There is some disagreement about the age of the building as English Heritage believes it was probably built around the early 18th century and extended in the 19th and 20th centuries. "The building is built of granite rubble with granite moorstone dressings. Grouted or slurried scantle slate roofs. Dressed granite stacks over the original gable ends." It originally had a two-room plan with a larger hall/kitchen to the right and a parlour over lower ground to the left. There may have been an unheated middle room as there is a small blocked window to the right of the doorway. The two rooms have been consolidated into one and the building was extended in the 19th century to the left at right angles to the front.

It is described as "all low beams and dark wood" with a "warm fire in the winter", and retains a medieval ambiance. Its specials are "Tinner's" and "Zennor Mermaid" (Sharp's Special). The Daily Telegraph notes its "sleepy, timeless quality and the way it's just not changed in centuries." Next door is White House, originally named Bos Cres, or "house in the middle", a Grade II-listed building dated to 1838 and restored in 2005, promoted as accommodation with the pub.

== Critical reception ==
The AA noted:

"Pigeon breast with mushrooms and tarragon sauce; Terras Farm duck breast with braised peas and new potatoes; chocolate fudge cake with clotted cream; or 'Moomaid' ice cream made on the local farm."

The Good Pub Guide ranked it 4.5 stars of 5 stating:

"Enjoyable ploughman's with three cornish cheeses and home-baked bread, long unspoilt bar with flagstones, granite, stripped pine and real fires each end, back dining room, well kept ales such as St Austell, Sharps Doom Bar and Wadworths 6X from casks behind counter, farm cider."

== Bibliography ==
- Carswell, Catherine (29 October 1981). The Savage Pilgrimage: A Narrative of D. H. Lawrence. Cambridge University Press. p. 45. ISBN 978-0-521-28386-1.
- Fergusson, Kirsty (4 September 2012). Bradt Travel Guide Slow Cornwall and the Isles of Scilly: Local, Characterful Guides to Britain's Special Places. Bradt Travel Guides. ISBN 978-1-84162-392-4.
- Hyde, Virginia (31 January 2008). The Risen Adam: D. H. Lawrence's Revisionist Typology. Penn State Press. ISBN 978-0-271-02845-3.
- Viccars, Sue (1 November 2008). Dorset. Crimson Publishing. ISBN 978-0-7117-4982-5.
