= Pendour Cove =

Beach in west Cornwall, England

Coordinates: 50.19495°N 5.57845°W

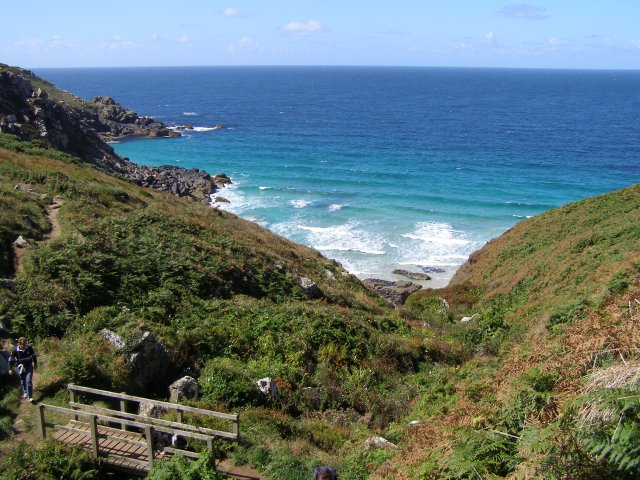
Pendour Cove

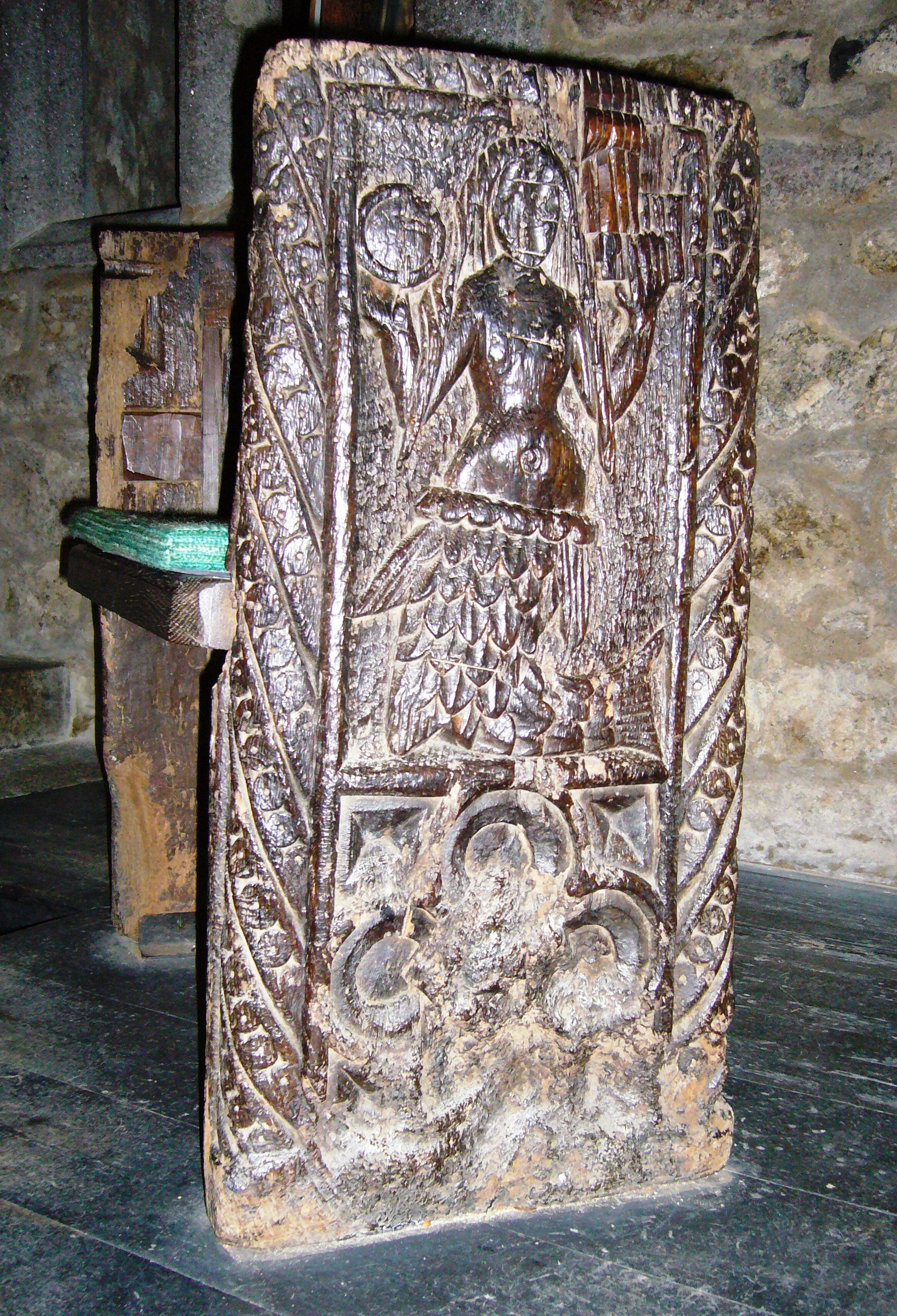
The Zennor Mermaid Chair

Pendour Cove (grid reference SW447389) is a beach in west Cornwall, England, UK. It is about 1 mile northwest of the village of Zennor, and immediately to the west of Zennor Head.

The name originates from the Cornish 'pen' (end, head) and 'dour' (water)

== Mermaid legend ==
A local legend the Mermaid of Zennor says that if you sit above Pendour Cove at sunset on a fine summer evening you might hear the singing of Matthew Trewella, of Zennor, who fell in love with a mermaid and followed her out to sea.

According to the legend, Matthew Trewhella was a good-looking young man with a good voice. Each evening he would sing, in a solo, the closing hymn at the church in Zennor. A mermaid living in neighbouring Pendour Cove was enchanted by his singing. She dressed in a long dress to hide her long tail and walked, a little awkwardly, to the church. Initially, she just marvelled at Matthew's singing before slipping away to return to the sea. She came every day, and eventually became bolder, staying longer.

It was on one of these visits that her gaze met Matthew's, and they fell in love. The mermaid knew, however, that she would have to go back to the sea or else she would die. As she prepared to leave, Matthew said "Please do not leave. Who are you? Where are you from?" The mermaid replied that she was a creature from the sea and that she had to return there. Matthew was so love-struck that he swore he would follow her wherever she went. Matthew carried her to the cove and followed her beneath the waves, never to be seen again.

It is said that if one sits above Pendour Cove at sunset on a fine summer evening one may hear Matthew singing faintly on the breeze. The legend is the subject of the 1980 song "Mermaid" by Cornish folk singer Brenda Wootton.

== History ==
At the parish church of St. Senara, visitors to Zennor may see a carved pew-end, over 600 years old, showing an image of the legendary mermaid.

British abstract sculptor Dame Barbara Hepworth, who lived in Cornwall, produced Pendour between 1947 and 1948. It is now in the collection of the Hirshhorn Museum in Washington D.C.
