= Henry Quick =

Cornish poet (1792–1857)

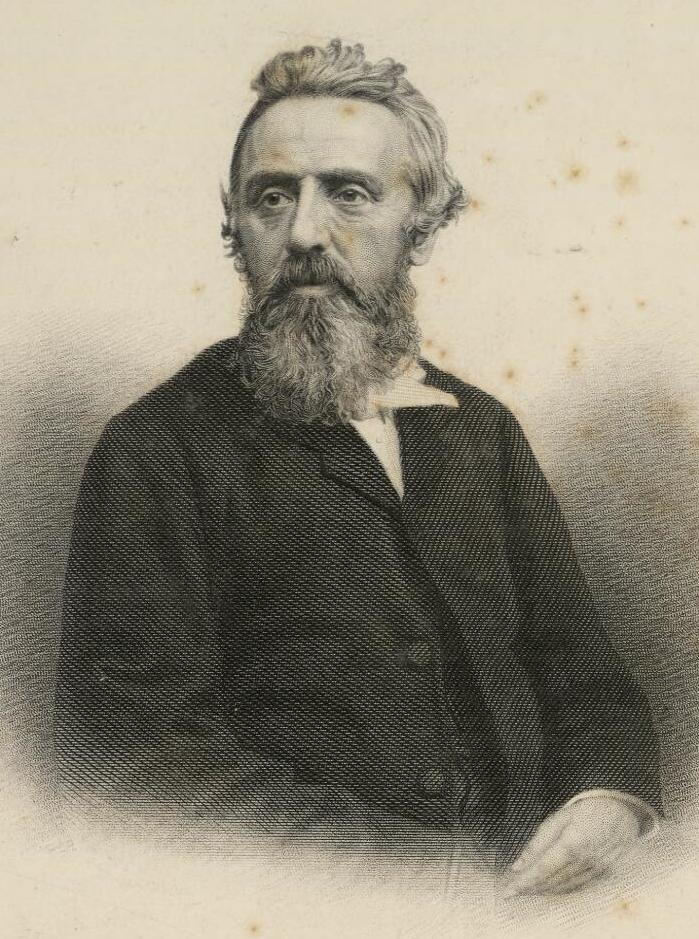
- Born: 4 December 1792; Zennor, Cornwall
- Died: 9 October 1857 (aged 64); Zennor
- Occupation: Poet,
- Writing career
- Period: 19th century

Henry Quick (1792–1857) was a Cornish poet who wrote about rural life in Cornwall.

Quick was born on 4 December 1792 at Zennor in Cornwall to Henry Quick and Margery George. His parents earned a meagre income from spinning and farming a small leasehold. As a young man, Quick began composing 'rugged verses for the countryside'. He was soon earning money by selling popular journals that he bought each month in Penzance.

From 1830 until his death in 1857, Quick wrote poems about local calamities and crimes, usually closing each poem with a religious exhortation. He printed most of his meditations as broadsides.

In 1836 Quick wrote his Life and Progress in eighty-nine verses. In 1838, he published verses on the new Queen Victoria in A new Copy, &c., on the Glorious Coronation of Queen Victoria. In 1848, he wrote about the Great Famine in Ireland in A new Copy of Verses on the Scarcity of the Present Season and Dreadful Famine in Ireland (1848).

An example of his poetry was published in The Cornishman in 1890,

In Zennor parish I was born

On Cornwall’s coast, remember;

My birthday was in ninety-two,

The fourth of bleak December.

Oft times abroad I take my flight

(Take pity on poor Henry)

To sell my books: ‘tis my delight

To gain an honest penny.

Quick died at Mill Hill Down, Zennor, on 9 October 1857.

== Other sources ==
- Peter A.S. Pool The Life and Progress of Henry Quick of Zennor, 1994
