= Mermaid of Zennor =

Cornish folktale

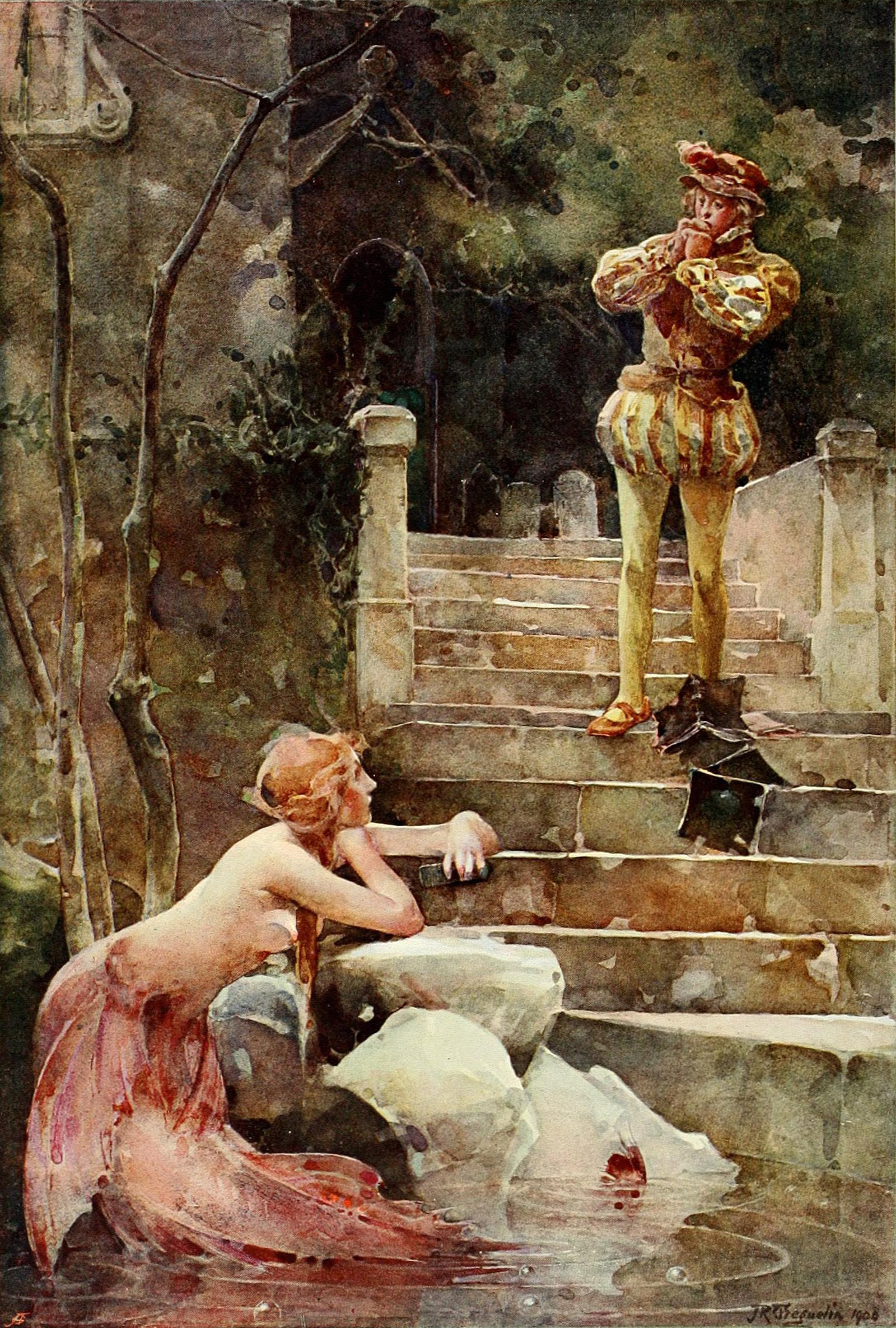
The Mermaid of Zennor, by John Reinhard Weguelin (1900)

The Mermaid of Zennor (Cornish: An Vorvoren a Senar) is a Cornish folk tale which originates in the village of Zennor. The legend tells the story of a mysterious woman who occasionally attended the parish church of Zennor; a young man followed her home one day, and neither were seen again. One Sunday, a mermaid appeared to a group of local sailors, asking that they raise their anchor to let her enter her home, and the villagers concluded that she was the same woman who had attended their church. The legend is associated with a carved bench-end in the church, which depicts a mermaid.

== Background ==
Cornish folklore features numerous stories about merfolk, and decorative mermaid motifs are common in Cornish churches. In Cornish legend, mermaids hold spiritual symbolism, and are viewed more positively than in many other cultures. In the Ordinalia, the dual nature of Christ is compared to that of a mermaid: "He might well be Half man and half God. Human is half the mermaid, Woman from the head to the heart; So is the Jesus".

== Legend ==
Cornish folklorist William Bottrell recorded the Mermaid of Zennor in 1873 when he visited Zennor. In his retelling, a beautiful and richly-dressed woman occasionally attended services at St Senara's Church in Zennor, and sometimes at Morvah. The parishioners were enchanted by her beauty and her singing; she appeared infrequently for many years, but never visibly aged, and no one knew where she was from. The woman became interested in a young man named Mathey Trewella, known as the best singer in the parish. One day, he followed her, and neither were ever seen again.

The villagers wondered what had become of the two, until one Sunday a ship cast anchor about a mile from Pendour Cove. Soon after, a mermaid appeared, and asked that the anchor be raised, as one of its flukes was resting on her door, and she was unable to reach her children. (Note: Bottrell recorded two accounts: in one version, the mermaid told the sailors that she was returning from church, and anxious to see her children; in the second, she needed to dress her children for church.) The sailors obliged, and quickly set sail, believing the mermaid to be an ill omen. When the villagers heard of this, they concluded that the mermaid was the same lady who had long visited their church, and that she had enticed Mathey Trewella to come and live with her.

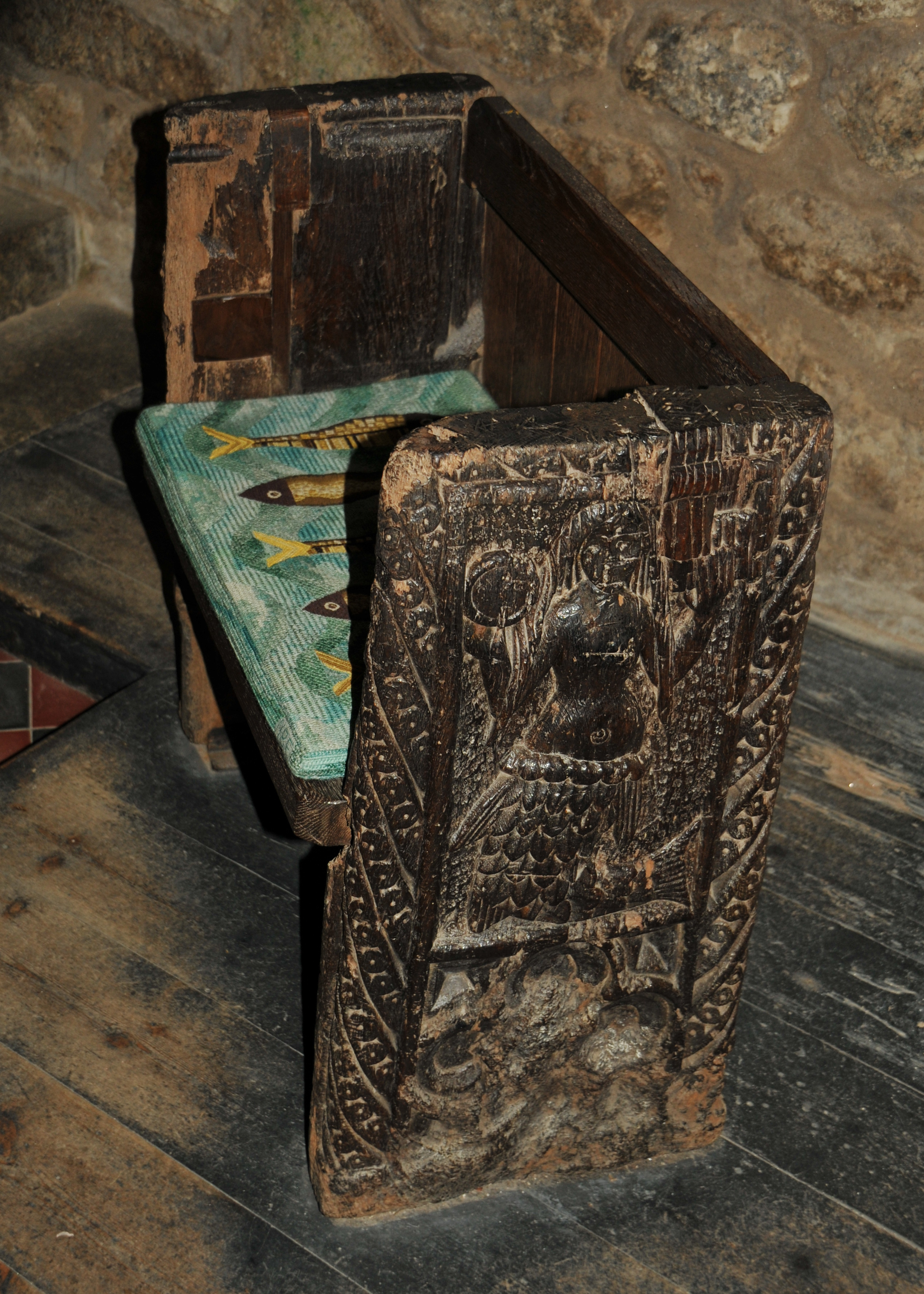
The Zennor Mermaid Chair

A shorter account of the legend was related to Bottrell on a subsequent visit to Cornwall. The mermaid had come to church every Sunday to hear the choir, and her own voice was so sweet that she enticed Mathey Trewella, son of the churchwarden, to come away with her; neither was seen again on dry land. The famed "mermaid chair" was the same bench on which the mermaid had sat and sung, opposite Trewella in the singing loft.

== Textual history ==
The Mermaid of Zennor is associated with a carved bench-end in St Senara's Church which depicts a mermaid; the legend itself likely postdates the carving, although local tradition relates that the carving served to commemorate the tale and as a warning against the temptation of beauty. The carving has likely reinforced the legend, contributing to its popularity.

The story of the mermaid is retold in later collections of Cornish folklore, generally following the original accounts collected by Bottrell.

== Analysis ==
The Mermaid of Zennor is unusual, in that the mermaid seeks to attend church, rather than being repulsed by Christian practice as is common in other northern European legends. The story bears similarities to The Mermaid Wife, (Note: 'The Mermaid Wife' is a migratory legend described by Reidar Thoralf Christiansen, which involves a man stealing a magical item from a mermaid, preventing her from returning to the sea and thus forcing her to stay on land as his wife.) although the gender roles are reversed: the mermaid is the captor, and the man is the captive. The ending of the story, where the mermaid asks for the anchor to be lifted, resembles another legend designated as Removing a Building Situated over the House of the Fairies; (Note: 'Removing a Building Situated over the House of the Fairies' is another migratory legend, in which the underground dwelling of supernatural beings is negatively affected by human activity above, often involving manure.) Ronald James suggests the Mermaid of Zennor is a mutation of this story, and that the final part may have also formed a separate legend.

== Adaptations ==
=== Literature ===
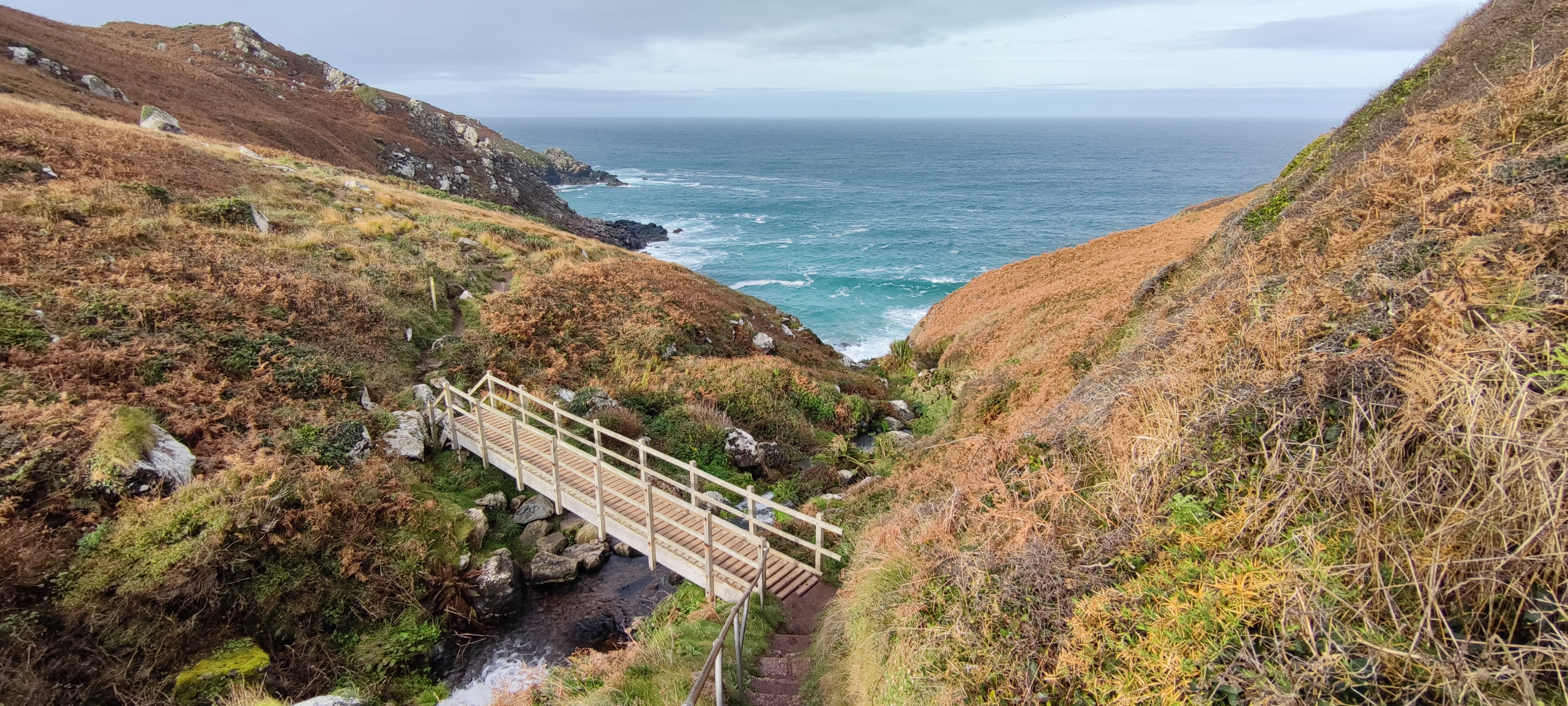
Bridge and stream in the village of Zennor, Cornwall, England

Poems based on the legend have been written by Vernon Watkins, Charles Causley, and John Heath-Stubbs.

Craig Weatherhill wrote the Mermaid of Zennor into his novel Seat of Storms (Tabb House, 1997), giving her the name Azenor, as the previous tellings never name her.

Eileen Moloney published a book of the same title, illustrated by Maise Meiklejohn in 1946.

The legend is linked to Saint Senara in Sue Monk Kidd's The Mermaid Chair, which was adapted into a movie for Lifetime in 2006. Kidd's novel has brought increased attention to the original folklore, particularly from a New Age perspective.

In the 1948 movie Miranda the titular character is a mermaid named Miranda Trewella, who is found at Pendour Cove, details evidently inspired by the Mermaid of Zennor.

British writer Helen Dunmore was inspired in part by the Mermaid of Zennor when writing her Ingo Chronicles. The first book of the series, Ingo, published in 2005, begins with the story of the mermaid and the main story line is loosely based around the legend.

=== Music ===
The legend is the subject of the 1980 song "Mermaid" by Cornish folk singer Brenda Wootton, recorded for her 1980 album Boy Jan ... Cornishman.

2011 saw the premiere of composer Leo Geyer and poet Martin Kratz's modern retelling of the legend in a chamber opera, which was described by The Times as "imaginative and beautifully shaped" in its second production by Constella OperaBallet at the Tête à Tête Opera Festival 2012.

In 2012 the legend was adapted by Paul Drayton for an opera commissioned by the Cornish company Duchy Opera.

In 2014 singer/songwriter Martha Tilston released her album The Sea featuring the song "Mermaid of Zennor".

2015 saw the premier of "The Mermaid of Zennor" by Philip Harper, a work for brass band. Commissioned for the Cornwall Youth Brass Band, it was chosen for the National Brass Band Championship regionals in the same year (second section).

== See also ==
- Lí Ban, an Irish mermaid regarded as a saint
- The Little Mermaid
