= Zennor =

Village in Cornwall, England

Coordinates: 50.192°N 5.568°W

Zennor: Cornish: Eglossenar
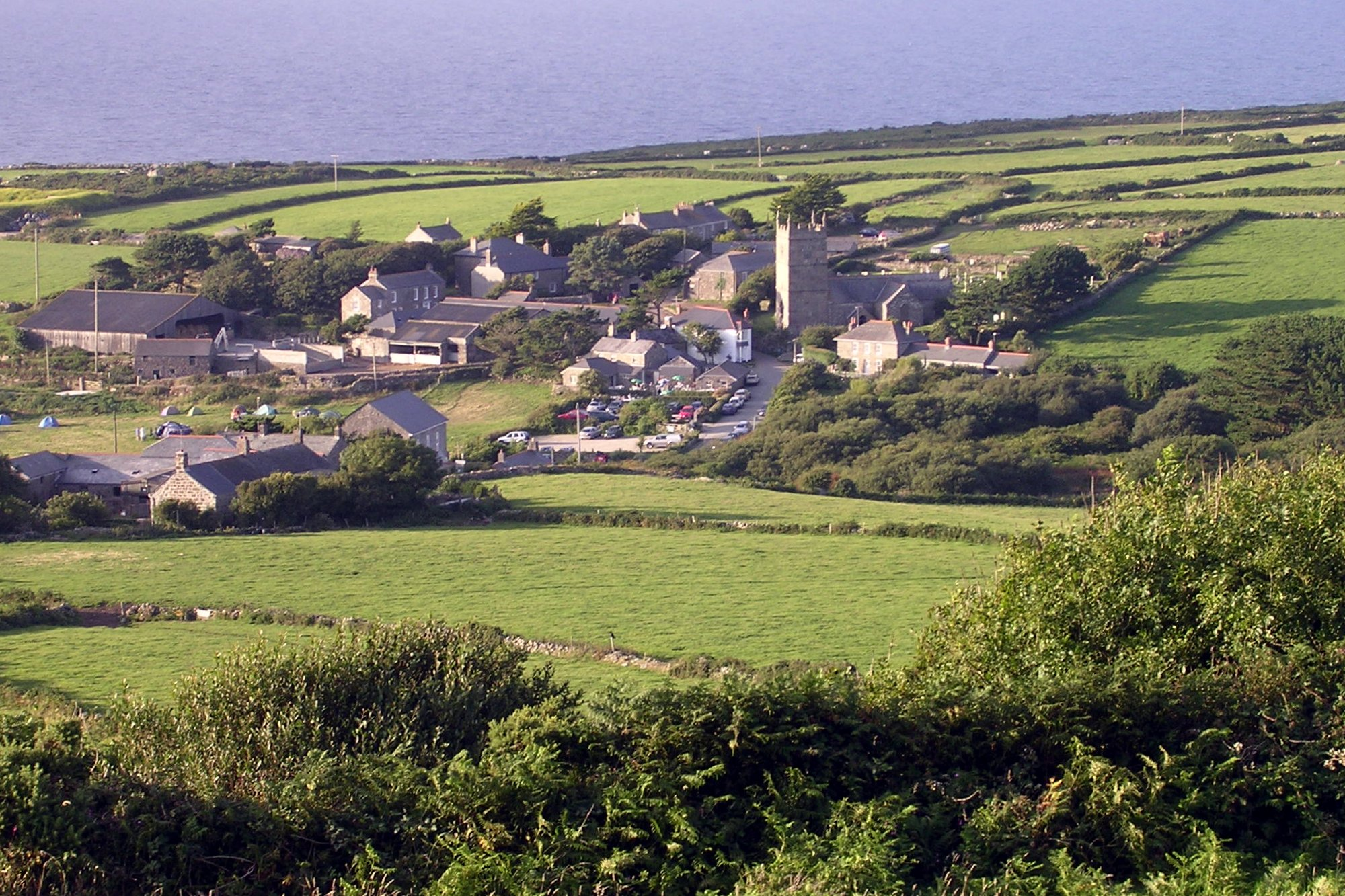
- Zennor from Trewey Hill

- Location within Cornwall
- Population: 196 (civil parish, 2011 Census)
- OS grid reference: SW458384
- Civil parish: Zennor
- Unitary authority: Cornwall
- Ceremonial county: Cornwall
- Region: South West
- Country: England
- Sovereign state: United Kingdom
- Post town: ST. IVES
- Postcode district: TR26
- Dialling code: 01736
- Police: Devon and Cornwall
- Fire: Cornwall
- Ambulance: South Western
- UK Parliament: St Ives

Zennor (/ˈzɛnər/; Cornish: Eglossenar (village) or Pluw Senar (parish)) is a village and civil parish in Cornwall, England, United Kingdom. The parish includes the villages of Zennor, Boswednack and Porthmeor and the hamlet of Treen. Zennor lies on the north coast, about 6 miles (10 km) north of Penzance, along the B3306 road which connects St Ives to the A30 road. Alphabetically, the parish is the last in Britain. Its name comes from the Cornish name for the local saint, Saint Senara.

Zennor Head is a coastal promontory north of the village. The cliffs rise over 60 metres (200 ft) from the sea and the highest point of the headland is 96 metres (314 ft) above sea level. The village itself is at an elevation of around 110 metres (360 ft).

Zennor lies within the Cornwall Area of Outstanding Natural Beauty (AONB). Almost a third of Cornwall has AONB designation, with similar status and protection as a National Park.

Frank Baker's 1956 novel Talk of the Devil is set in Zennor and deals with fictionalised versions of Aleister Crowley and some of his associates. Helen Dunmore's 1993 novel Zennor in Darkness is set in and around the village in 1917 when D. H. Lawrence lived nearby. Zennor is also mentioned in the Ulysses Moore series of books, written by Pierdomenico Baccalario; in fact, near Zennor and St Ives there would be the mysterious hamlet of Kilmore Cove, the place where the series is mainly set.

== Local government ==
For the purposes of local government Zennor elects a parish council of seven members every three years. Higher functions are exercised by Cornwall Council. Until March 2009 the parish was included in the former Penwith Council District.

== History and antiquities ==
Antiquities include the megalithic burial chambers Zennor Quoit and Sperris Quoit, 400 yards (370 m) apart, about 1 mi (1.6 km) east of the village. There is a prehistoric entrance grave at Pennance known as the Giant's House and not far away are four round barrows. Gurnard's Head, or Trereen Dinas, is an Iron Age promontory fort (or cliff castle) with five lines of fortification, and a mile to the west is Bosigran, close to Treen (Cornish: Tredhin), a second promontory fort along with a surviving field system, suggested by Henry Jenner to mean 'the Dwelling of Igerna', King Arthur's mother in Arthurian legend.

Between 1915 and 1917, writer D. H. Lawrence lived near the village with his new wife Frieda. It was during this time that he finished Women in Love. The couple were later accused of spying and signalling to German submarines off the Cornish coast and in late 1917, after constant harassment by the armed forces authorities, Lawrence was forced to leave Cornwall at three days' notice under the terms of the Defence of the Realm Act 1914 (DORA). This persecution was later described in an autobiographical chapter of his Australian novel Kangaroo, published in 1923. In September 2016 events were held to celebrate the centenary of Lawrence's connection with Zennor.

In 1943, the middle of World War II, No. 4 Commando were involved in a mock seaborne raid codenamed "Exercise Brandyball", which took place on the 300-foot (91 m) cliffs, near Bosigran, known as the 'Brandys'. The training exercise was deemed one of the most hazardous and challenging of the war, beginning with a seaborne landing, followed by a climb up the vertical cliffs with full kit to destroy the target, an old disused tin mine. On the rehearsal day of 6 June, the weather was not good and one of the boats sank with the loss of two commandos. These events were filmed by Allied officers, as observers from all the services were present, including General Bernard Montgomery. The archives are now held in the Imperial War Museum. The following day the men decided the operation should continue, and it was successfully completed on 7 June.

== Parish Church of St Senara ==
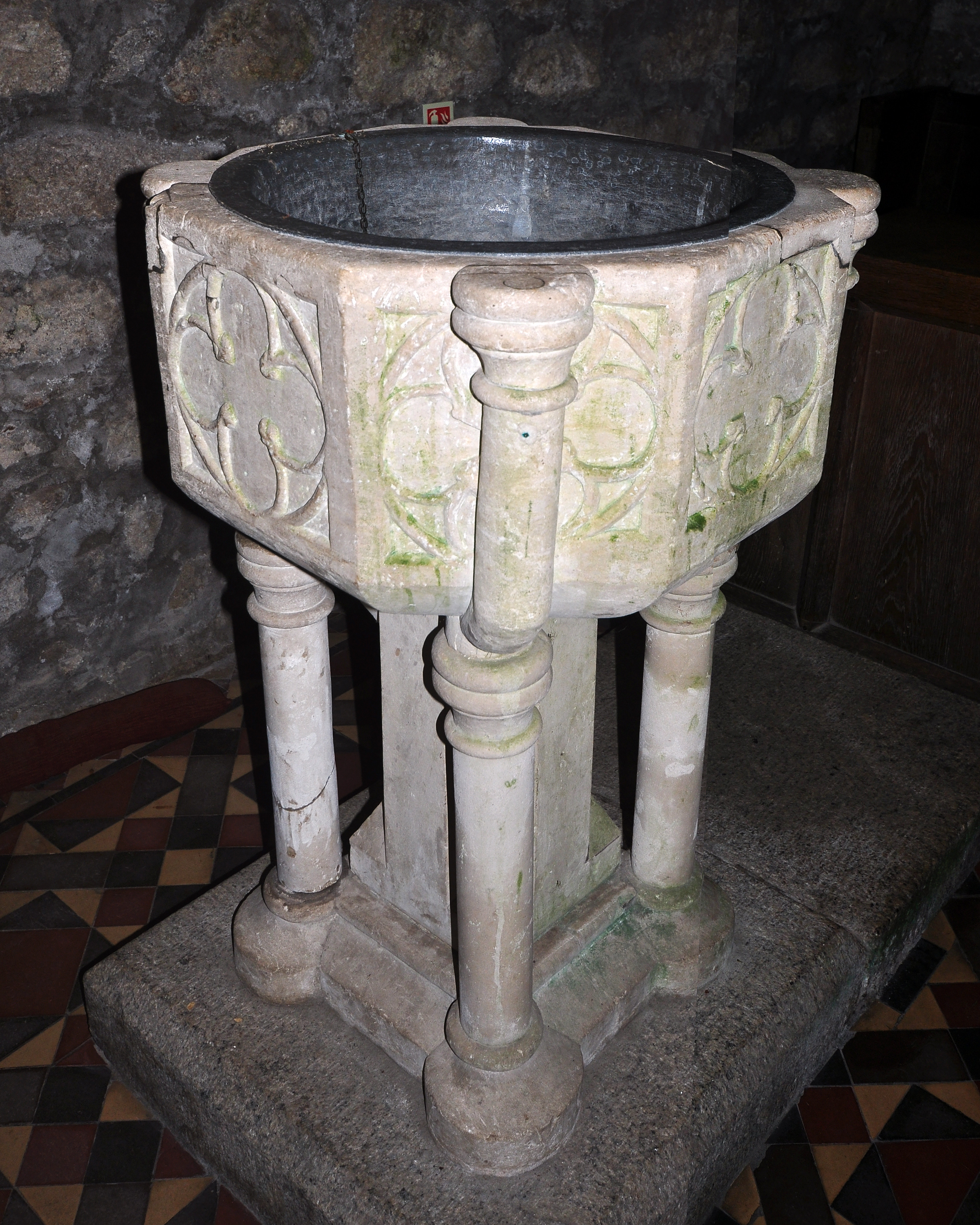
The Zennor church font

The Church of St Senara is partly Norman and partly of the 13th and 15th centuries (the north aisle 15th century). There is a west tower and the octagonal font may be from the 13th century. One of only two remaining bench ends portrays the Mermaid of Zennor. Little is known of St Senara, although legend connects her to Princess Asenora of Brittany.

There are three Cornish crosses in the parish: one is in the vicarage garden and two are in the churchyard. Those in the churchyard are fixed on the tombstone of the Rev. William Borlase, Vicar of Zennor (died 1888).

Special Operations Executive intelligence officer Vera Atkins was cremated after her death and the ashes scattered in the churchyard. Her memorial plaque, shared with her brother Guy, has the inscription: "Vera May Atkins, CBE Légion d'Honneur Croix de Guerre".

== Culture and amenities ==
=== Late Cornish language use ===
The village of Boswednack was home to a small community of Cornish speakers during the 19th century. These included John Davey Jnr., 1812–1891 and his father, as well as Anne Berryman (1766–1854), and John Mann (1834–1914). John Mann recalled in an interview that, when a child, he and several other children always conversed in Cornish while at play together. It is from John Davey that we know the Cranken Rhyme, probably the last recorded piece of traditional late Cornish verse.

=== The mermaid of Zennor ===
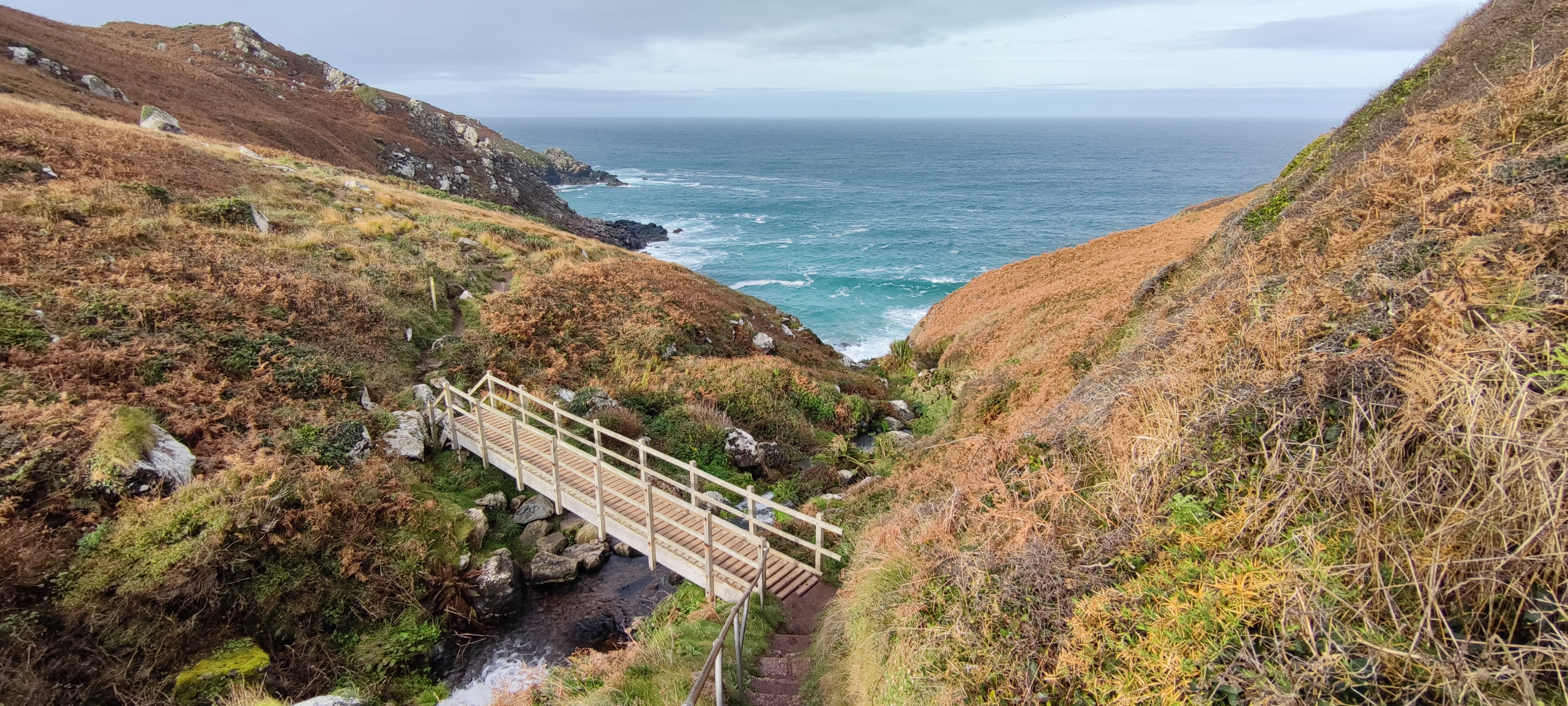
Bridge and stream in the village of Zennor, Cornwall, England

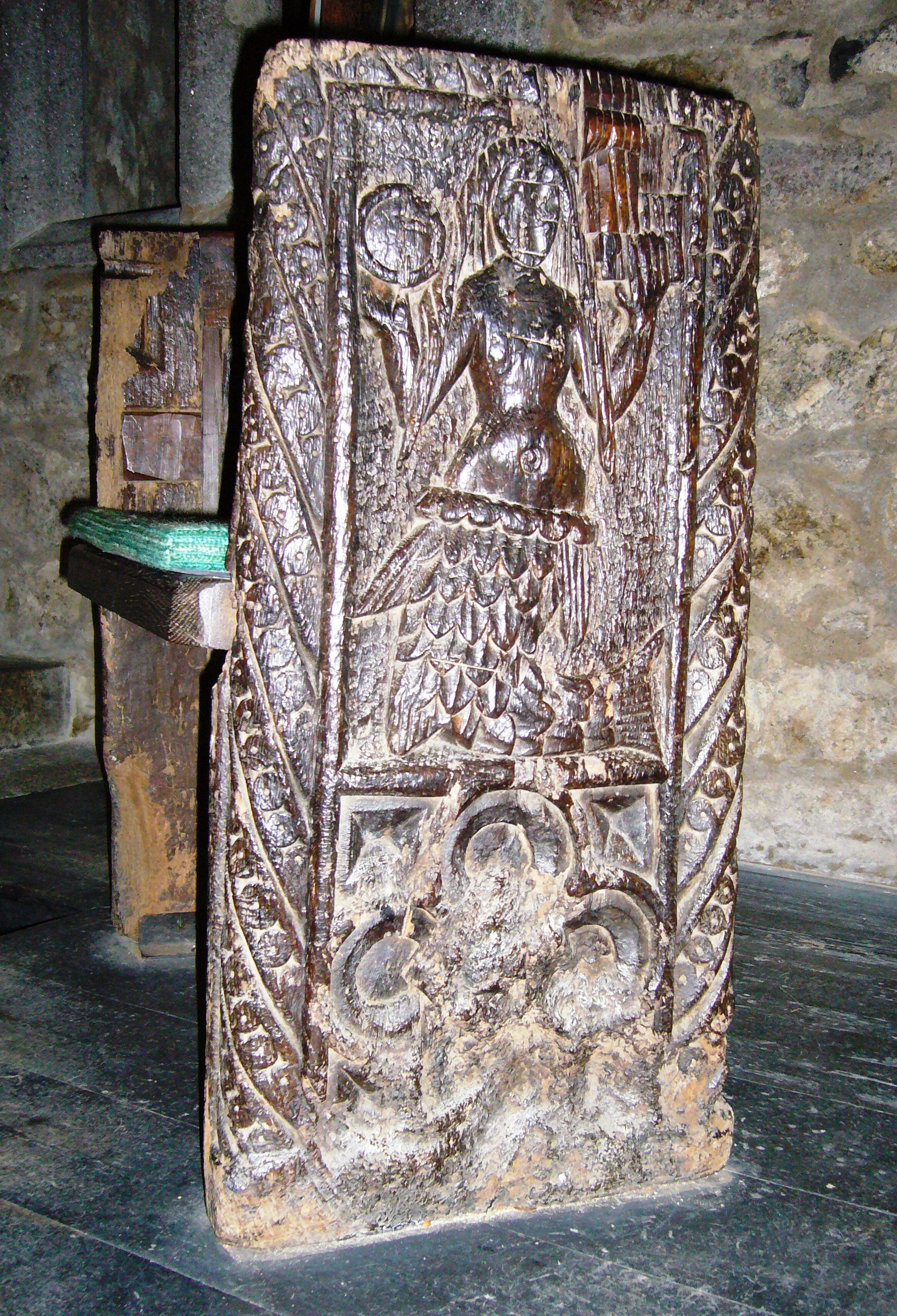
The carved bench-end depicting a mermaid in St Senara's Church

The legend of the mermaid of Zennor concerns a mermaid that visits St Senara's Church and entices local parish singer Mathey Trewella away. The legend was probably inspired by a 15th-century carved bench-end in the church that shows a mermaid.

In its turn, the legend has inspired Vernon Watkins' poem "The Ballad of the Mermaid of Zennor", Sue Monk Kidd's novel The Mermaid Chair, Cornish poet Charles Causley's book The Merrymaid of Zennor, the song "Mermaid" by Cornish folk singer Brenda Wootton, the song "The Mermaid of Zennor" by English singer-songwriter Paul William Gibson, and Helen Dunmore's Ingo Chronicles.

=== Amenities ===
As well as a public house, the Tinner's Arms, next to it is a guesthouse

=== Carne Cottage ===
Carne Cottage is one of a number of abandoned buildings in the area. It is claimed that the cottage used to belong to the occultist Aleister Crowley in the 1930s, although there is no evidence that Crowley ever owned the cottage, or ever even visited it. It is claimed that the death of Katherine Laird Cox, on 23 May 1938, was connected with Crowley and the cottage, but again, there is a lack of evidence to support this and it is likely to be an urban myth.

Additionally, this story – which includes the claim that Gerald Vaughan had gone mad – is disputed. As Antoni Diller has pointed out, whilst Gerald's wife Ellaline was known to suffer from hallucinations, there is no evidence that Gerald went mad. In fact, he went on to become an editor of Freedom, an anarchist newspaper based in London.

=== Patrick Heron ===
Patrick Heron lived in Cornwall until the age of nine and he returned in 1956 to live at "Eagle's Nest", overlooking the cliffs near Zennor.

Many of the sharp-edged shapes in his artistic works are reminiscent of the aged Cornish coastline, while the rounded shapes recall the granite boulders in his own garden. He died peacefully at his home in Zennor in March 1999, at the age of 79, and many of his works are displayed at the Tate St Ives art gallery.

== Gallery ==
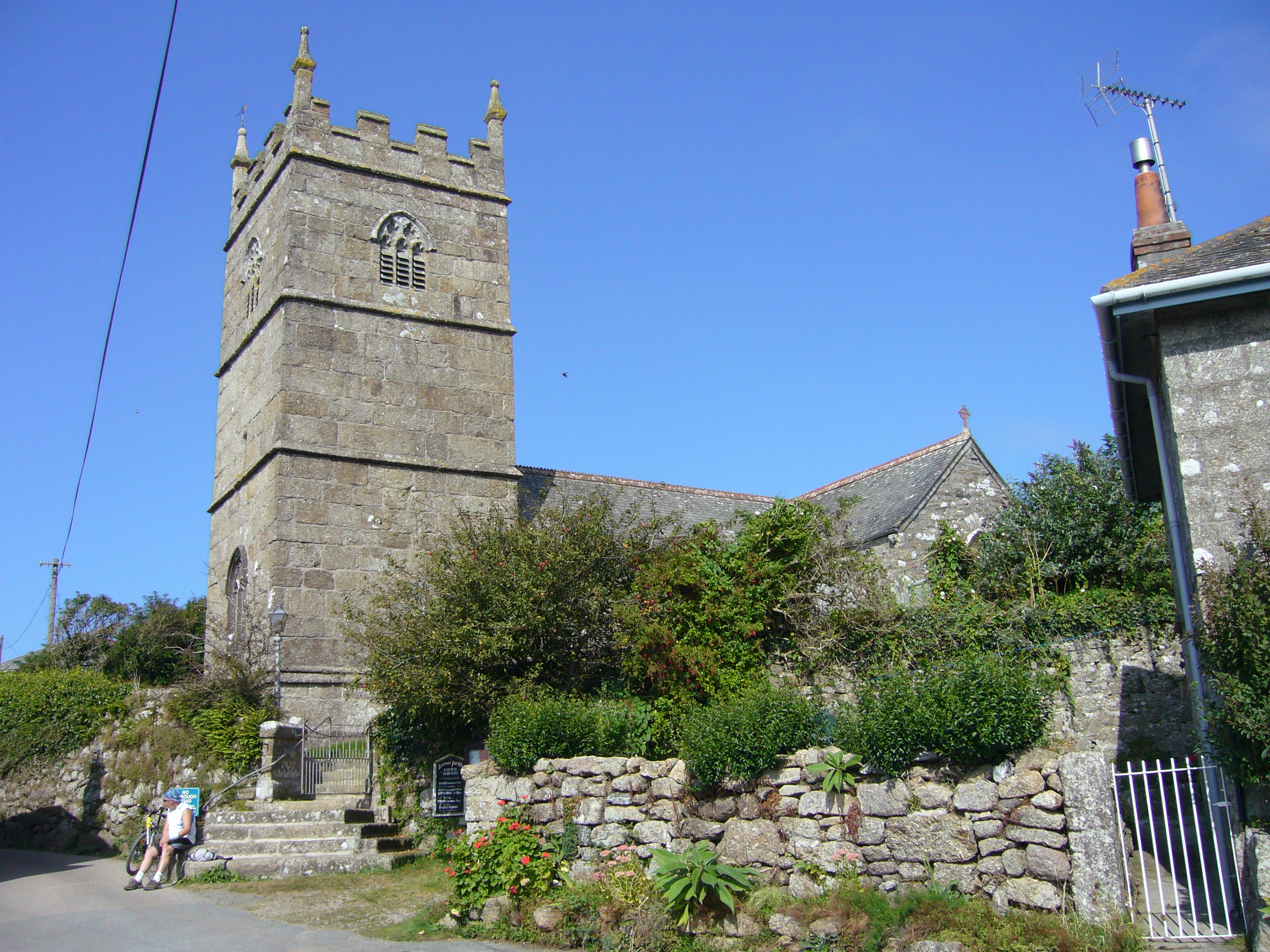
Zennor Church

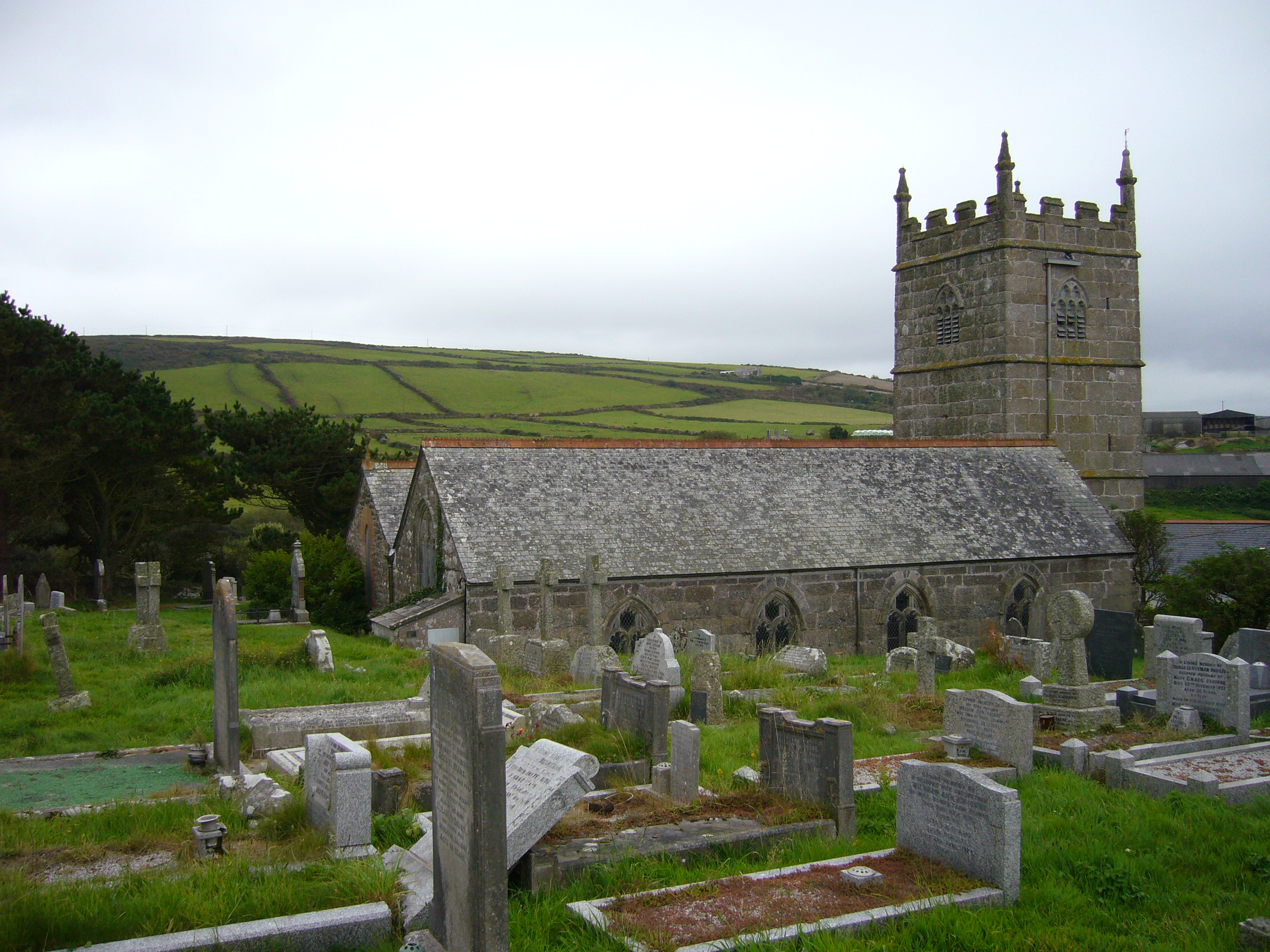
Zennor Church from the northeast

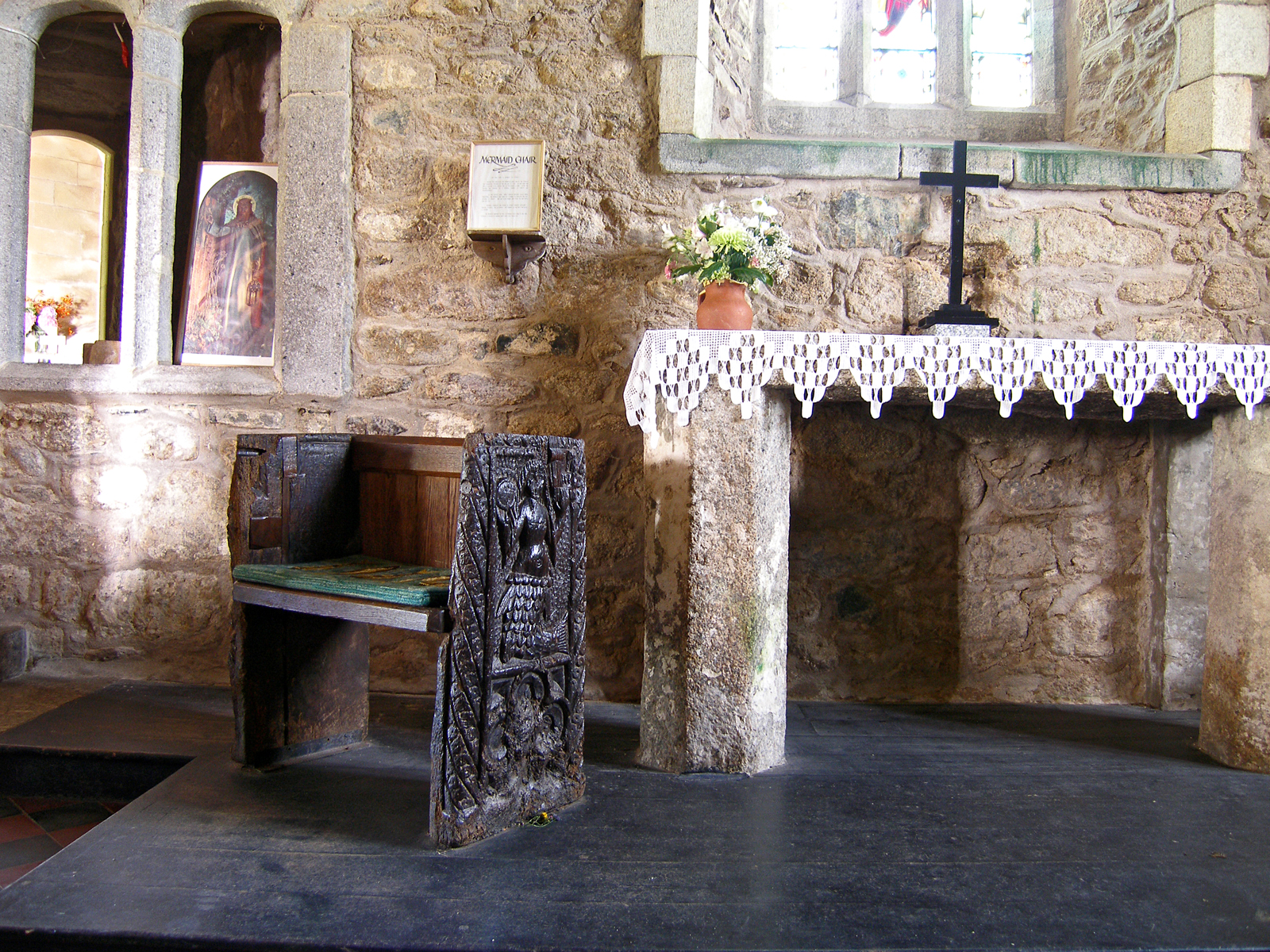
Zennor Church (interior, with Mermaid Chair)

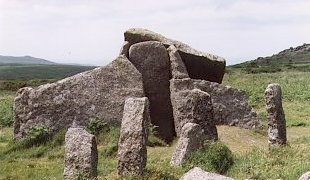
Zennor Quoit, about a mile southeast of Zennor village

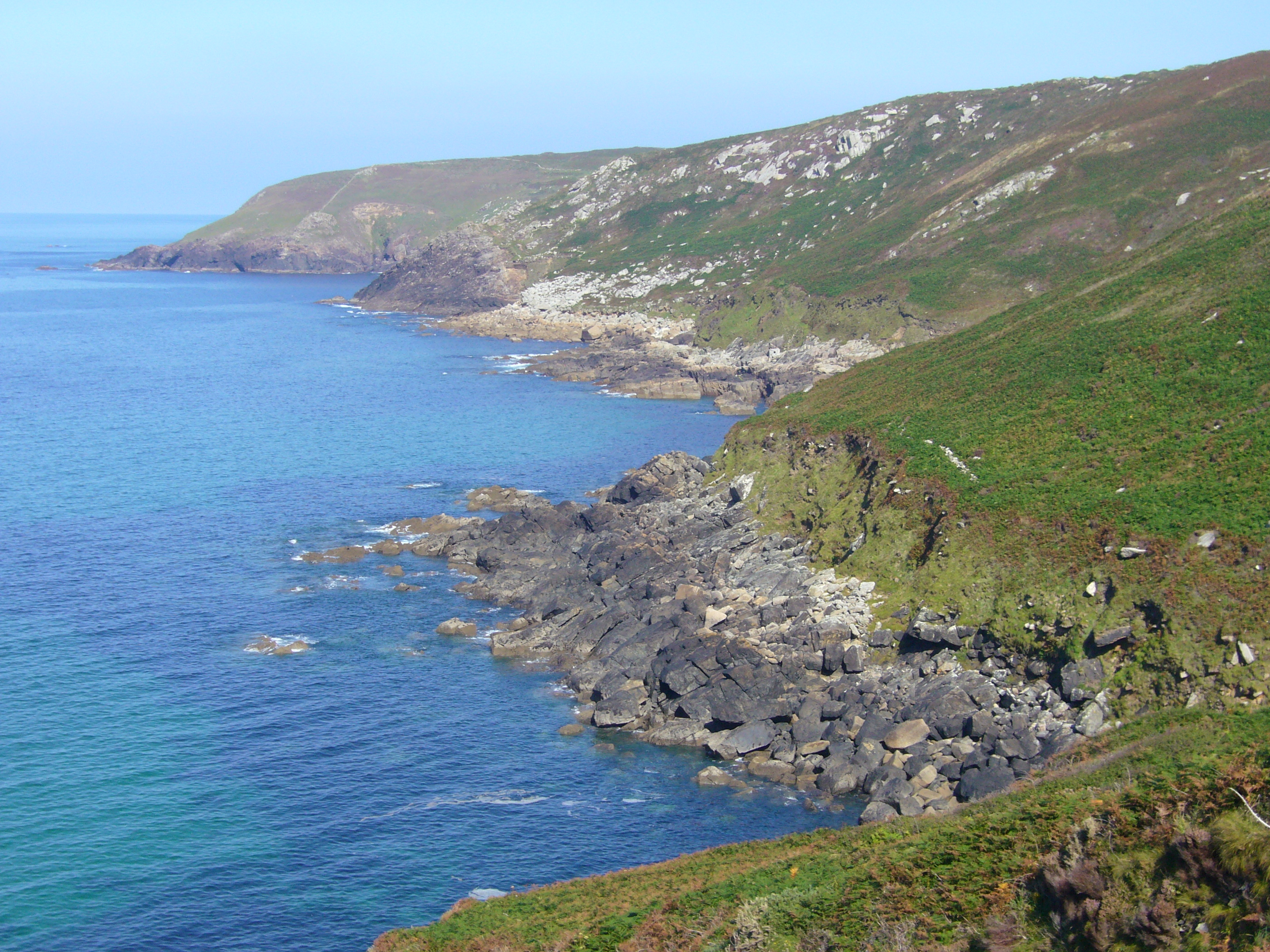
View to the east from Zennor Head

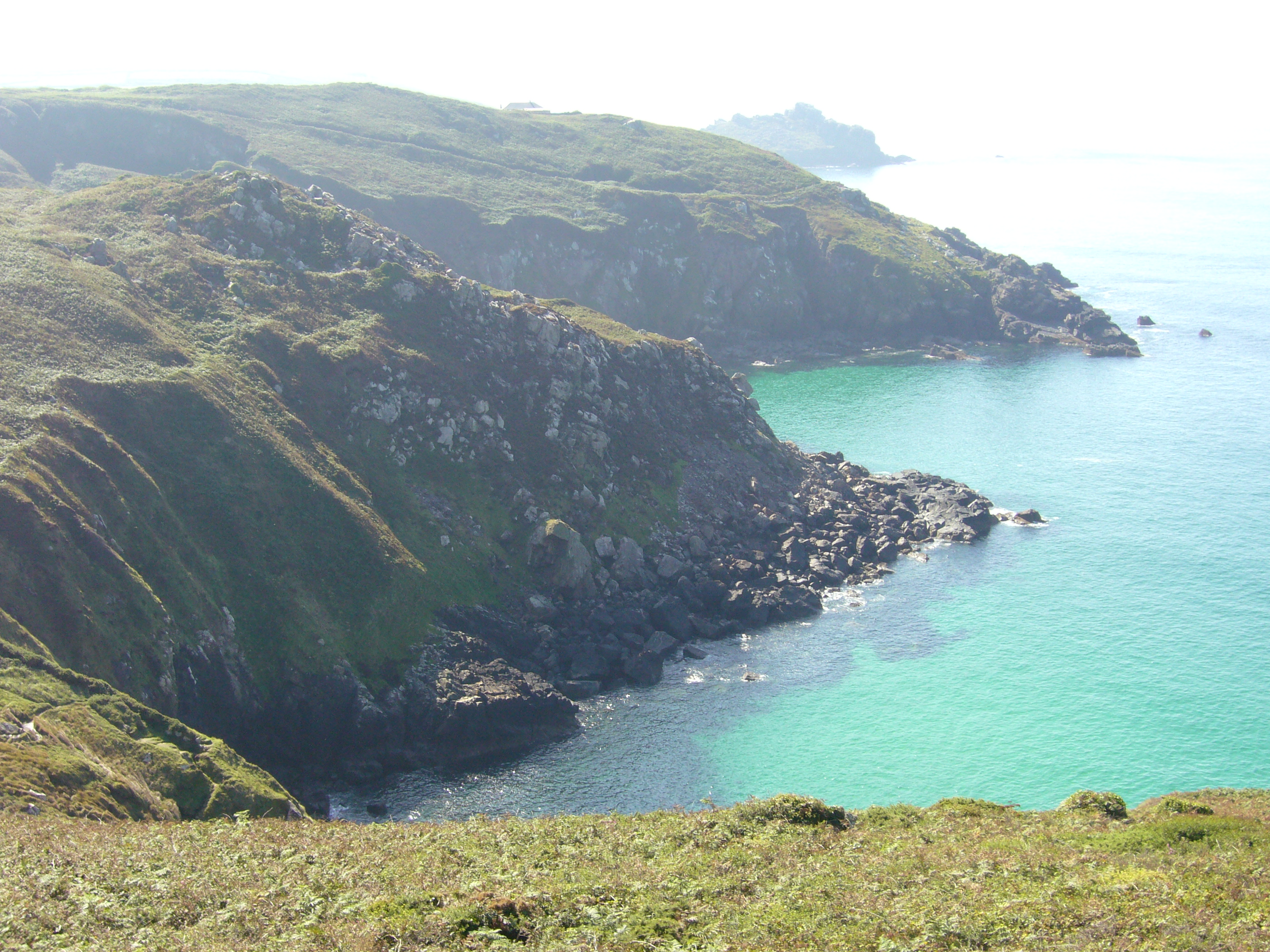
View to the west from Zennor Head

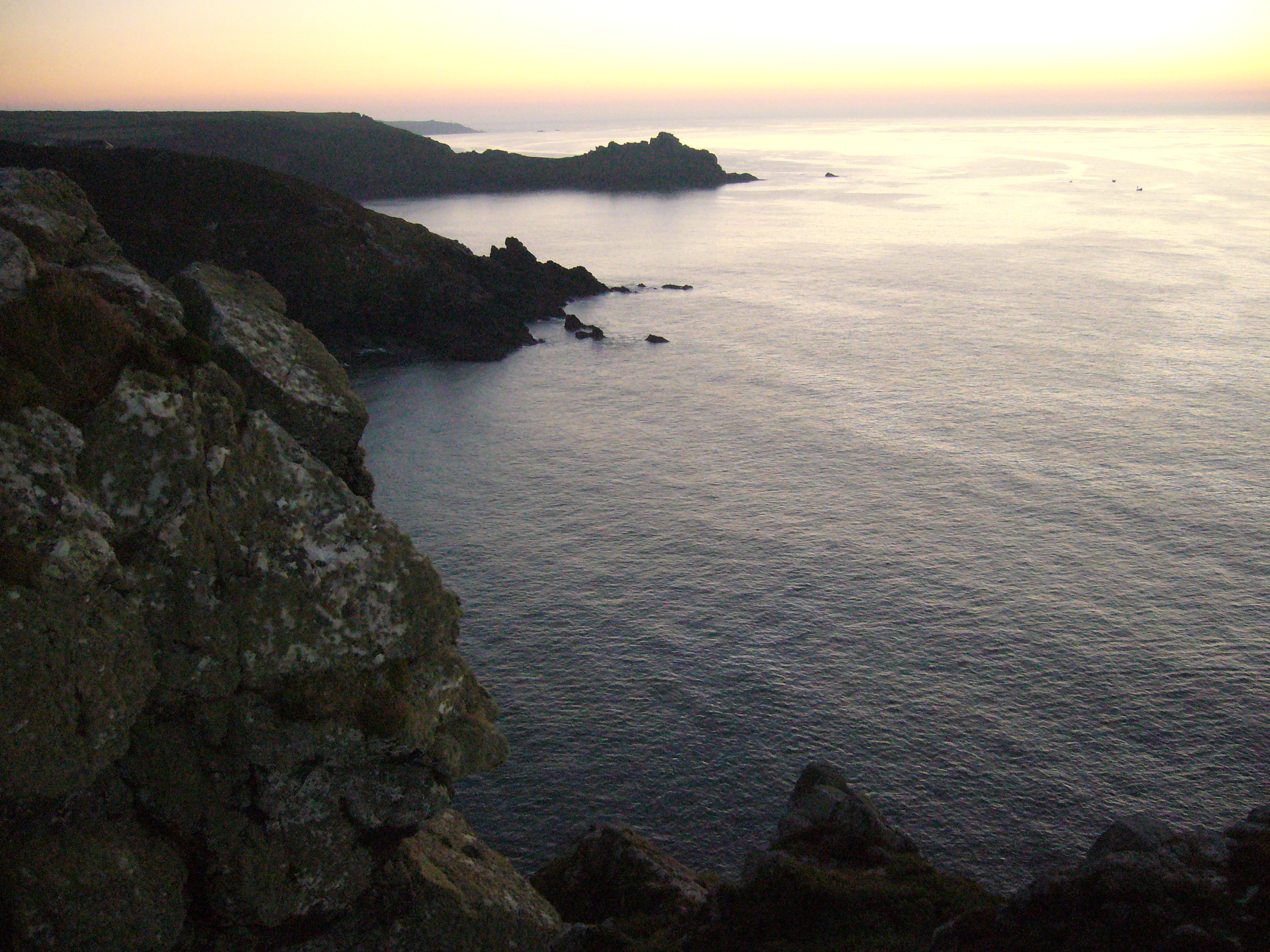
Zennor Head in the evening

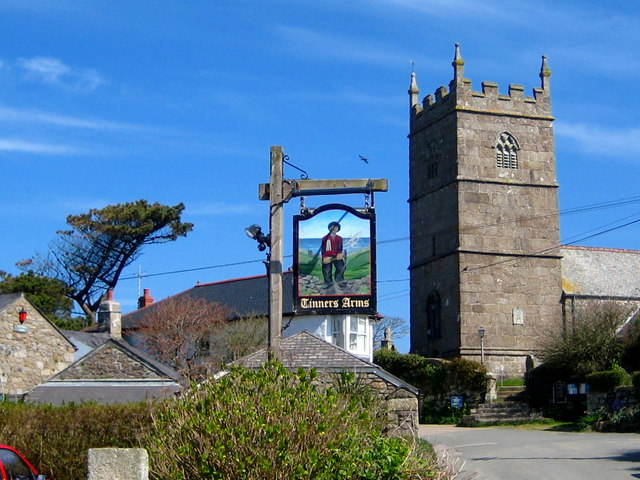
The pine, the pub sign and the church

== Notable people ==
- Henry Quick (1792–1857), poet who wrote about rural life in Cornwall.
- John Davey (1812–1891), farmer who was one of the last people with knowledge of the Cornish language.
- Susanna Heron (born 1949) a site-specific artist in stone relief, grew up locally
