= St Senara's Church, Zennor =

Church of Saint Senara
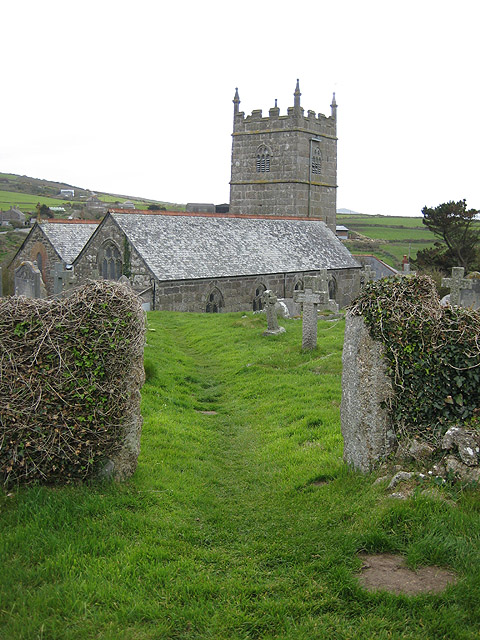
- St Senara's Church in Zennor

- Location in Cornwall
- 50.1918°N 5.5674°W
- Denomination: Church of England

History
- Dedication: Saint Senara

Administration
- Province: Canterbury
- Diocese: Truro
- Archdeaconry: Cornwall
- Deanery: Penwith
- Parish: Zennor

Clergy
- Priest: Revd. Elizabeth Foot

Listed Building – Grade I
- Official name: Church of Saint Sennar
- Designated: 10 June 1954
- Reference no.: 1312091

St Senara's Church, in Zennor Churchtown, Cornwall, England, UK, is the parish church of the parish of Zennor. It is in the Deanery of Penwith, Archdeaconry of Cornwall, and Diocese of Truro. It is dedicated to the local saint, Saint Senara, and is at least 1400 years old, though it was rebuilt in the 12th century. It is a Grade I listed building.

== History ==
A church dedicated to Saint Senara has stood on the current site overlooking the sea since at least the 6th century AD, but the current building is partly Norman and partly of the 13th and 15th centuries (the north aisle 15th century). There is a west tower and the octagonal font may be from the 13th century. It was reputedly founded by Saint Senara on her return from Ireland with her son, who was by then a bishop, when they founded the village of Zennor.

One of only two remaining bench-ends in the church portrays the Mermaid of Zennor, depicted admiring herself in a mirror. This is on the so-called "Mermaid Chair" which also has carvings of fish on the seat, and which is believed to be at least 600 years old.

The church was ″completely restored″ and reopened by, George Wilkinson, the Bishop of Truro on 10 December 1890. On the church's outside wall, west of the south porch, is a memorial to John Davy, 1891, the last person whose native language was Cornish. The church is surrounded by a small circular graveyard, the boundaries of which have existed since the Bronze Age and in which parishioners have been buried for centuries. The churchyard holds the graves of the artists Bryan Wynter and Patrick Heron, who both lived in Zennor and drew inspiration from the surrounding landscape for their art.

Both this church and the church of the nearby village of Morvah lay claim to the local legend of a cow eating the bell-rope, at a time when such items were fashioned from straw.

The tower contains six bells in the key of G, four of which were cast by Gillett & Johnston in 1926 to accompany the two much older bells already there. In 2019, a full restoration of the bells was carried out by John Taylor & Co, allowing them once again to be used for change-ringing.

== Today ==
Saint Senara's is the parish church for Zennor, and mainly serves the village of Zennor, more properly called "Zennor Churchtown", after the church, to distinguish it from Zennor parish. The church remains in regular use for Sunday services, as well as hosting special events such as weddings and funerals. The priest-in-charge is Revd. Elizabeth Foot.

== Gallery ==
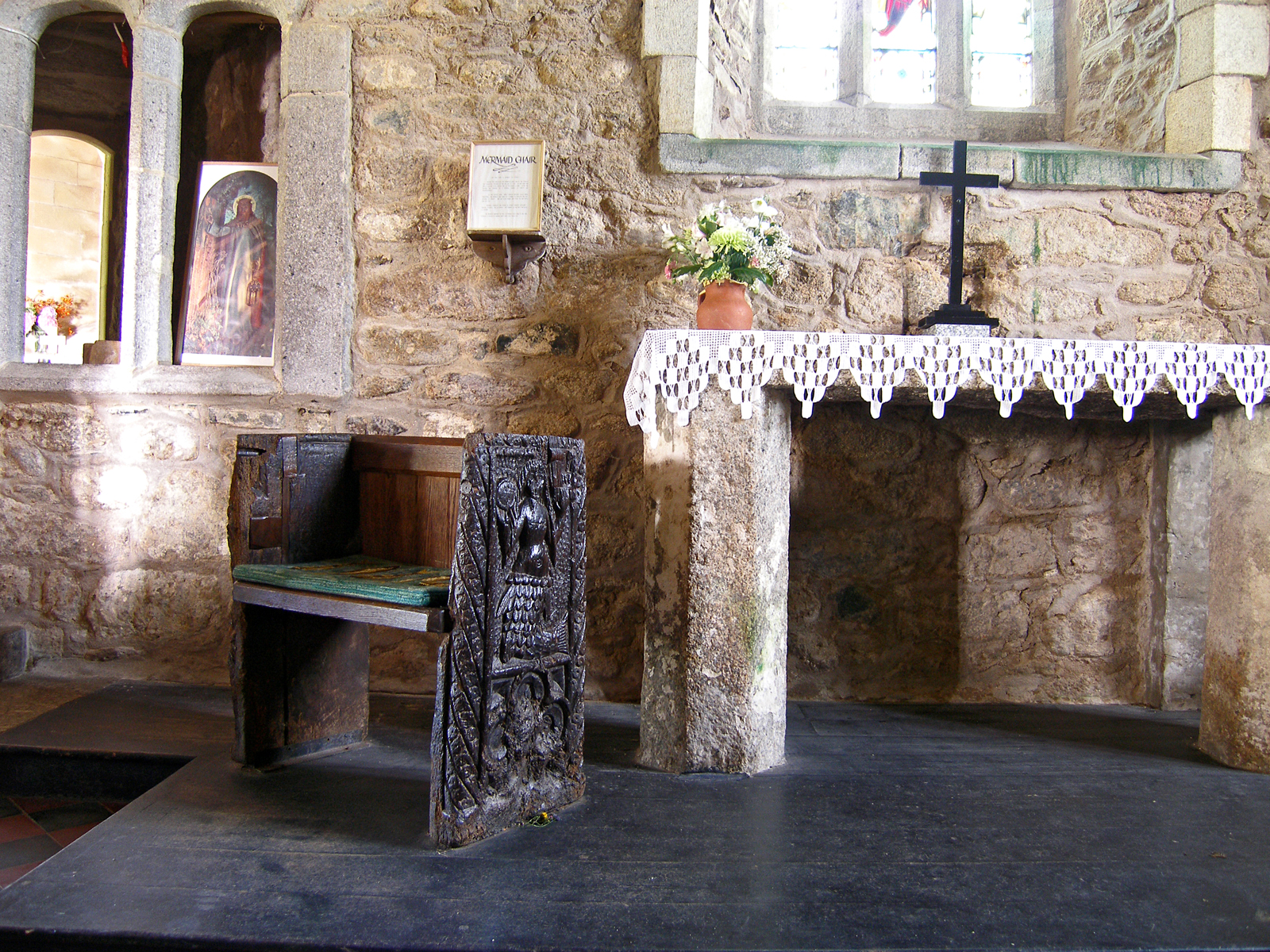
Mermaid chair and altar

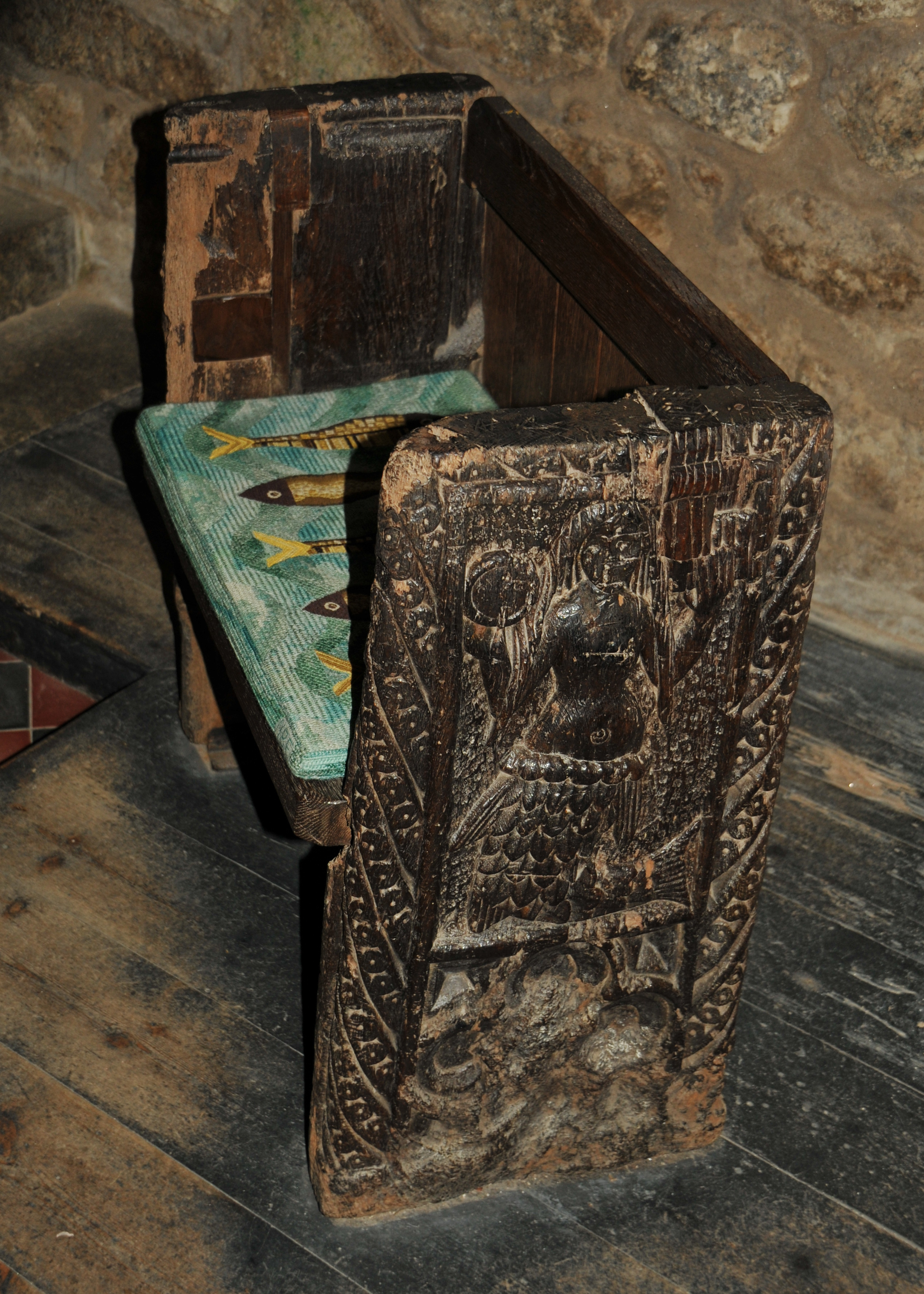
Mermaid chair

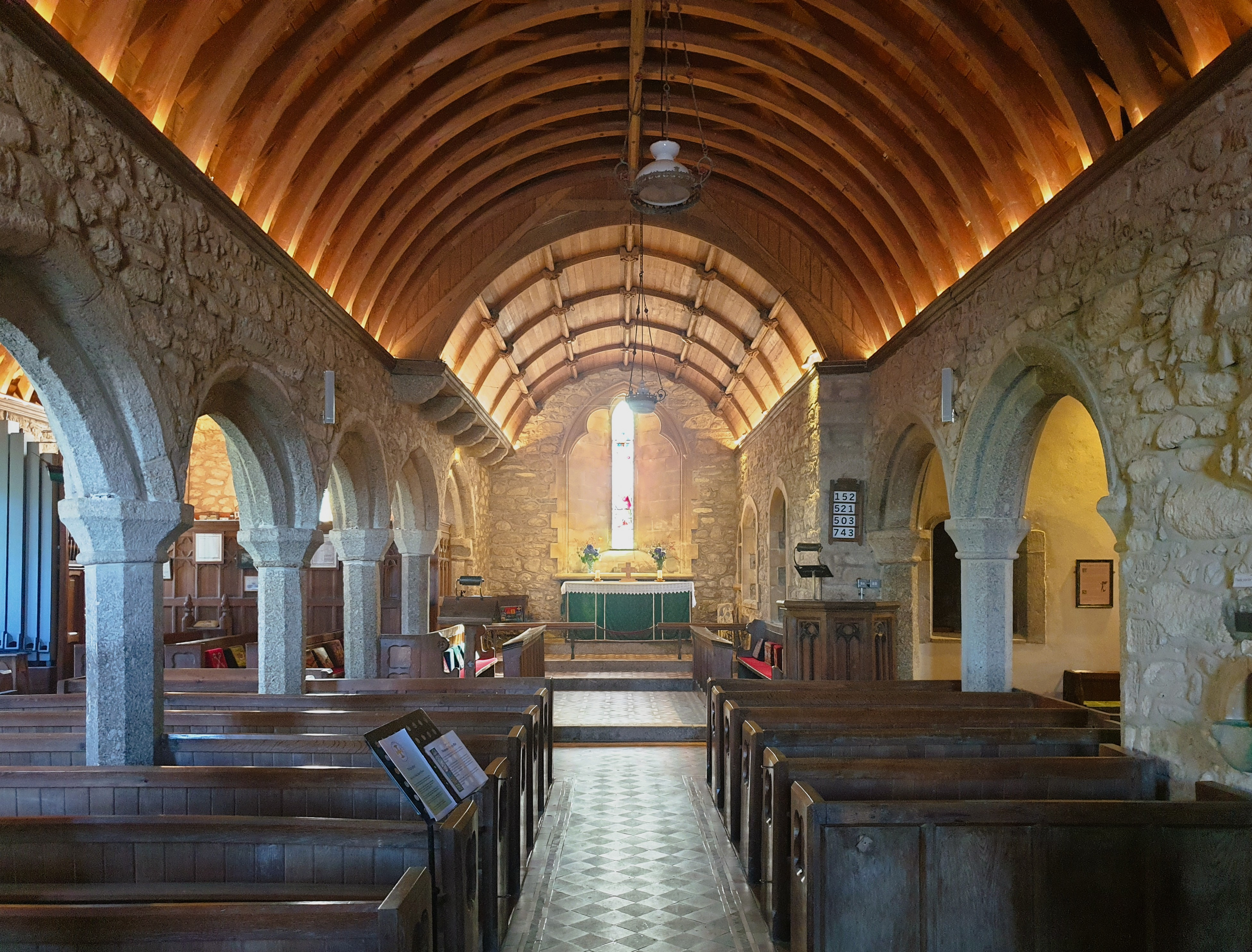
Interior

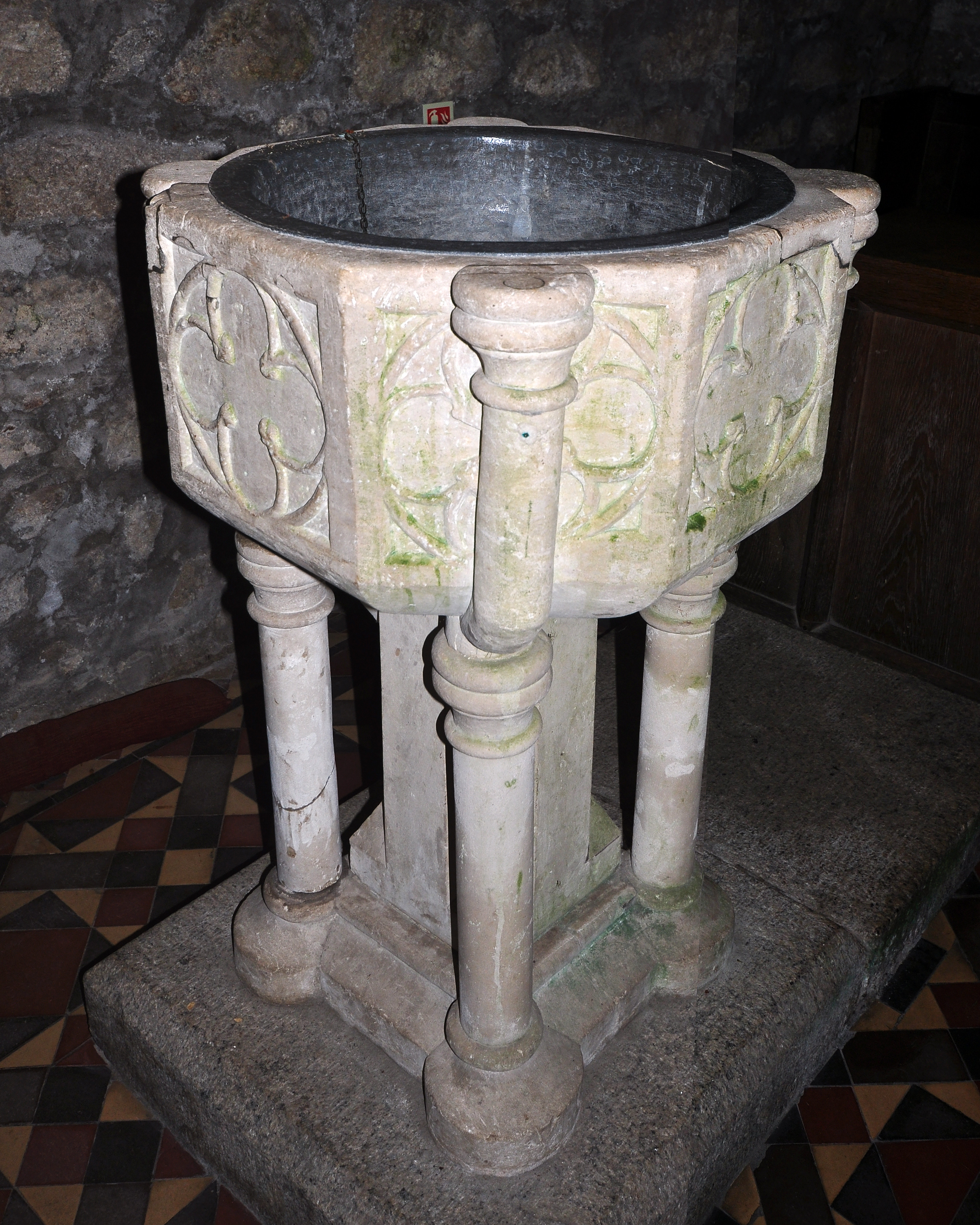
Baptismal font

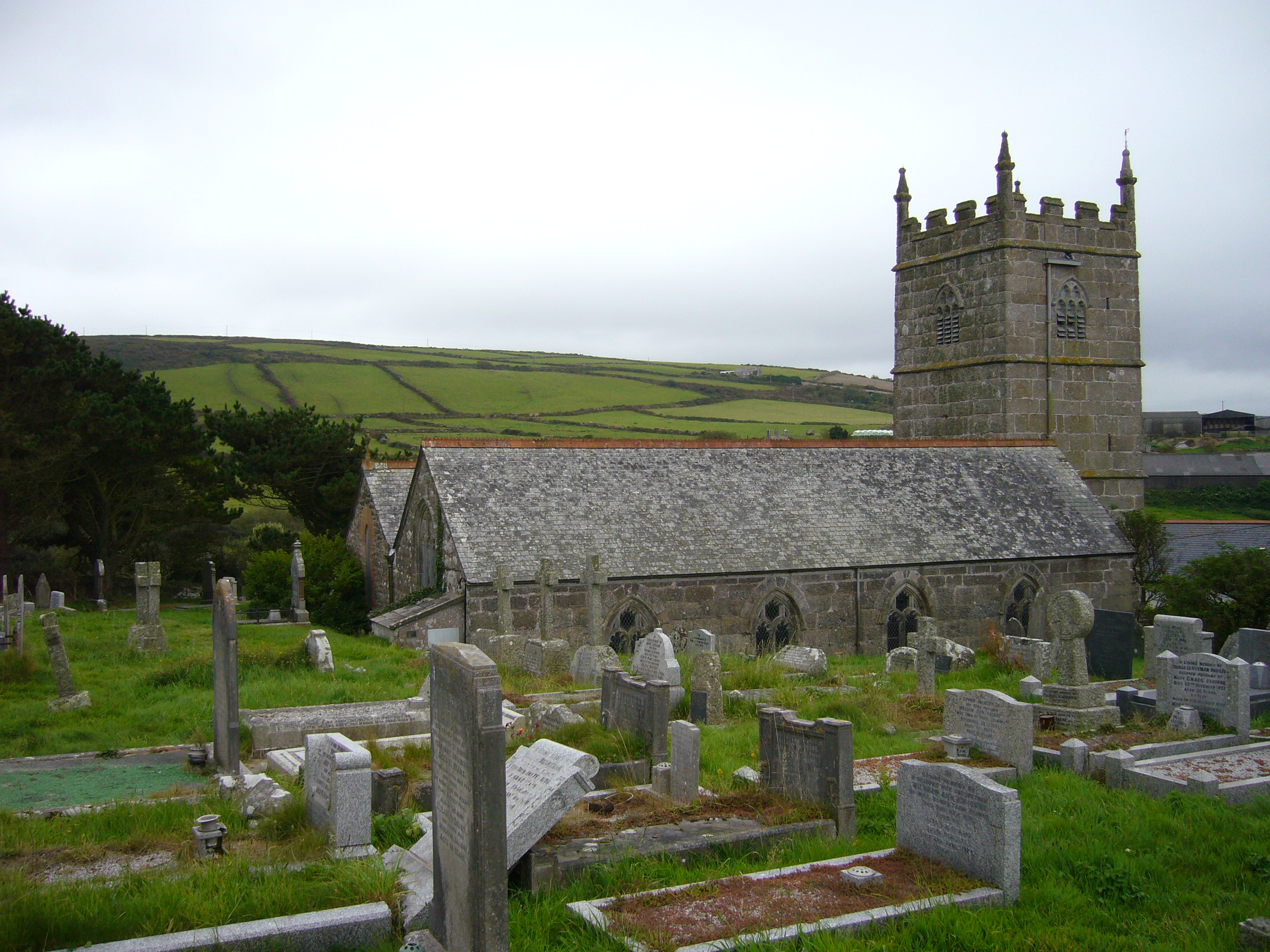
Zennor churchyard

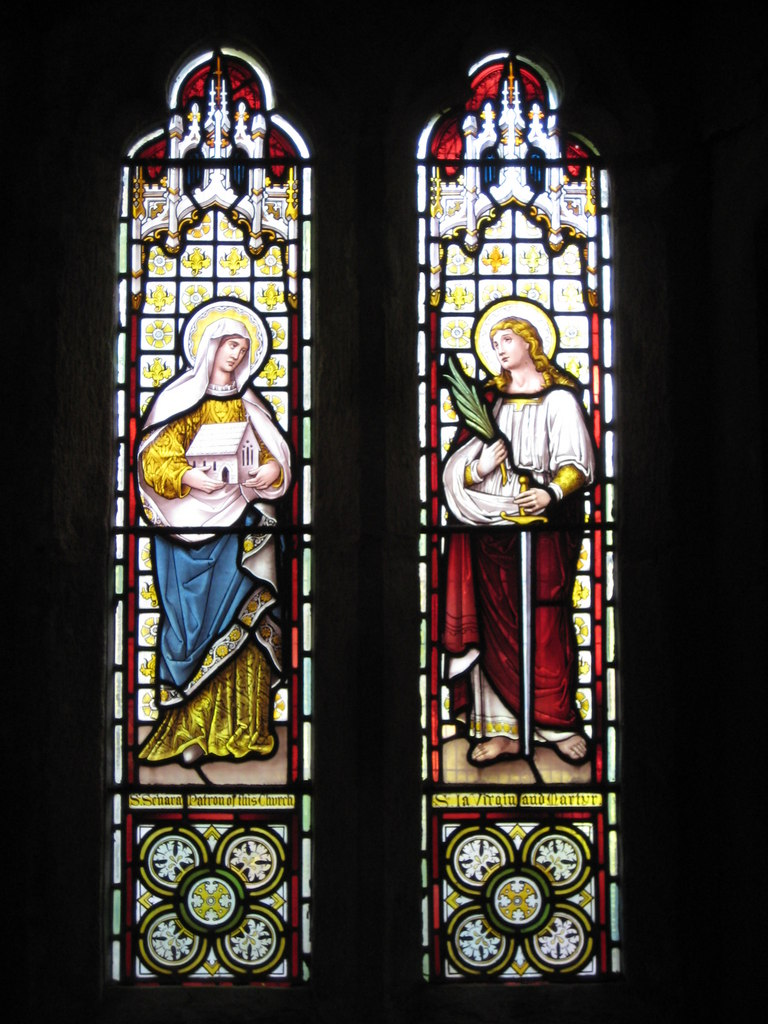
Stained-glass window depicting Saint Senara and Saint Ia

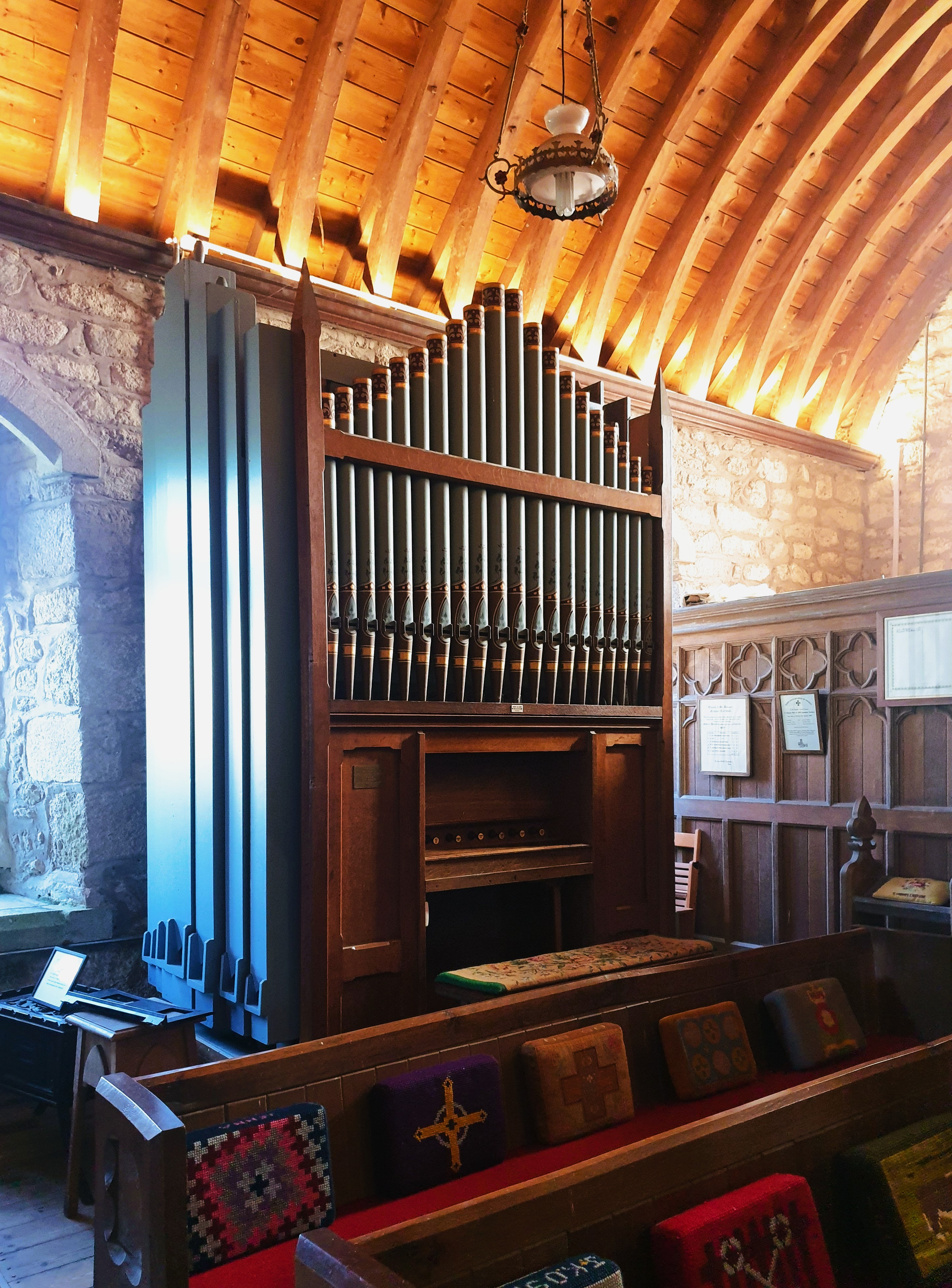
Organ
