= Paul Drayton (composer) =

British composer, conductor, pianist and teacher (born 1944)

Paul Drayton (born 28 December 1944) is a British composer, conductor, pianist, and teacher.

He was educated at High Wycombe Royal Grammar School from 1956 to 1962. He studied music at Brasenose College, Oxford, and was subsequently Director of Music at New College School, Oxford. While there he composed the music for one of the earliest adaptations of The Hobbit, with the text adapted by Humphrey Carpenter. J. R. R. Tolkien gave his permission and came to see the performance. The play ran from 14-17 December 1967.

Drayton later taught and was composer-in-residence at Stowe School near Buckingham.

Many of his compositions are vocal. His piece entitled Masterpiece was sung by the King's Singers in their 2005 DVD release From Byrd to the Beatles. He is the author of a listeners' guide to music entitled Unheard Melodies or Trampolining in the Vatican (Athena Press 2008)

He now lives in Cornwall where he has lectured at Truro College on both A-Level and International Baccalaureate courses. He is also a lecturer in adult education.

His opera The Hanging Oak, based on a story by M.R. James, was premiered in October 2009 in several church locations in the south-west of England. 2015 saw the premiere of his choral/orchestral work The Passion of Christ as told by Mark the Evangelist, in Truro Cathedral.

He was the musical director of Duchy Opera until the end of 2018.

His novel, Ultramarine, is set in mediaeval England and tells the story of a farm boy whose life is transformed when he becomes a chorister at a great abbey. His singing voice brings creative fulfilment but at a cost. Work with an alchemist places him in mortal danger and in due course a startling revelation about his family disrupts his world completely.

Musical Works

- New College Service (unaccompanied choral Magnificat and Nunc Dimittis, written for New College, Oxford)
- Nero (cantata)
- Six Characters in Search of an Opera (cantata, circa 1988)
- Lotos-Land (SATB and piano; words by Tennyson)
- Pavane (organ)
- Choral Prelude and Fugue on "Nun Ruhen Alle Walder" (organ)
- Dance in a Desolate Place (organ)
- Ecce Ancilla Domini (choir)
- The World's Desire (SATB)
- This Starry Stranger (SATB and organ; words by Richard Crashaw)
- Jesu Dulcis Memoria (SSATTB)
- My Soul, There is a Country (SATB)
- The Spacious Firmament (SSATTBB)
- Templa Quam Dilecta (cantata SATB and orchestra; words from Psalm 84)
- Now Glad of Heart Be Everyone (SATB and organ)
- How Like an Angel (SATB and organ)
- Come Rejoicing (SATB)
- Love's Redeeming Work is Done (chorus)
- Corpus Christi Carol (unison)
- The Hanging Oak (opera)
- Masterpiece (1986 or earlier, for choral ensemble)
- The Mermaid of Zennor (opera, circa 2011, based on the legend of the mermaid of Zennor)
- The Lark Ascending (choral arrangement, 2019)
