= Zennor Quoit =

Dolmen in the Cornwall region, England

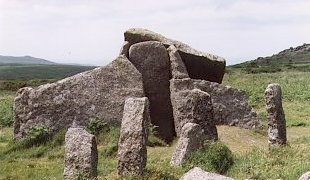

- Location within Southwest Cornwall
- 50°11′16.58″N 5°32′50.67″W
- Type: Dolmen
- Location: near Zennor and St Ives
- Region: Cornwall England

Site notes
- Condition: Ruined
- Website: "Zennor Quoit". Megalithic Portal.

Zennor Quoit is a ruined megalithic burial chamber or dolmen, located on a moor about a mile (1.6 km) east of the village of Zennor, Cornwall, England, UK. It dates to 2500–1500 BC. Aside from the 12.5-tonne (12,500 kg) roof, which collapsed some time between 1770 and 1865, the chamber is in good condition.

== Structural description ==
Zennor Quoit is located on the West Penwith moors about a mile to the east of the village of Zennor (OS coordinate SW468380). It is accessed by the B3306 road about two miles from St. Ives. From the road, the site may be reached via a trail from a spot named "Eagle's Nest" (OS coordinate SW468387).

The quoit measures 12.8 metres (42 ft) in total in diameter. Five stones support the roof, a massive slab measuring 18 by 9.5 feet (5.5 m × 2.9 m) and weighing an estimated 12.5 tonnes (12,500 kg), which has slipped from its original position, with one end resting on the ground. The chamber itself consists of seven upright stones and was originally covered by a cairn. It had a small porch at its entrance for the purpose of entering the chamber and also had an antechamber with an even smaller entrance.

300 metres (980 ft) to the east is Sperris Quoit, although this is in a considerably less fine state than the Zennor Quoit.

== History ==
The chamber dates to between 2500 and 1500 BC and is one of eight remaining quoits on the West Penwith moors. Archaeological evidence unearthed on the site has indicated that the chamber was used for the burial of bodies which at some point would be cremated and removed and replaced with others. The purpose of the exterior stones are believed to have been for resting the dead bodies against for the flesh to be devoured by birds before burial. Excavations at the site have revealed flint and Neolithic style pottery and cremated bones.

A local legend is associated with the chamber in that it is said that the quoit possesses mystical powers and that removed stones from the structure would soon mysteriously find their way back in the middle of the night. In 1754 and in 1769, before the roof had fallen, the quoit was analysed by the antiquary Dr. William Borlase (1695–1772), who described and provided detailed drawings of it and published some of his findings in his Antiquities of Cornwall (1769).

In 1861, a local farmer proposed to convert the monument into a cattle–shed by removing one of the upright pillars and drilling a hole in the sloping capstone. The vandalism soon reached the disapproving ears of the villagers of Zennor and the local vicar, William Borlase (a great-grandson of Dr. William Borlase), intervened and successfully offered a financial incentive of five shillings to the farmer to build it elsewhere, although he had already built stone posts on the site to erect it. Traces of drill–holes can still be seen in the stone

In 1882, a member of the Borlase family came to the defence of the quoit again when the Penzance Natural History and Antiquarian Society visited the site. The following account was reported:

Mr. Borlase, one of the members, met with a man who had made a find beneath the Zennor Quoit. The man explained that about a year ago, finding that other people were searching about, he and his son thought they would have 'a bit of a speer too.' After removing some of the earth, they came upon a flat stone, which they 'shut' (blasted). They then removed more earth and came upon another flat stone, which they also 'shut.' Underneath it they found what Mr. Borlase said was an ancient whetstone, which no doubt was buried with the dead, in order that he might have something to sharpen his weapons with in 'the happy hunting grounds' to which he was supposed to have gone. Mr. Borlase had found similar stones, with urns containing the ashes of the dead, in different barrows. Under this quoit he found part of an urn. Mr. Borlase expressed a hope that there would be no more 'shutting' near the quoit, because it ought to be regarded as sacred as the grave of a father.

Every year, the Old Cornwall Society meets behind the chamber on Midsummer's Eve and lights a ritual bonfire.

== Literature ==
Charles Taylor Stephens (d. 1863 in St Ives) was a shoemaker and the local postman from St Ives to Zennor who wrote a poem about the attempt to convert the quoit into a cattleshed. He was also employed by Robert Hunt to help in the collecting of folk tales from the Zennor area.

== Gallery ==
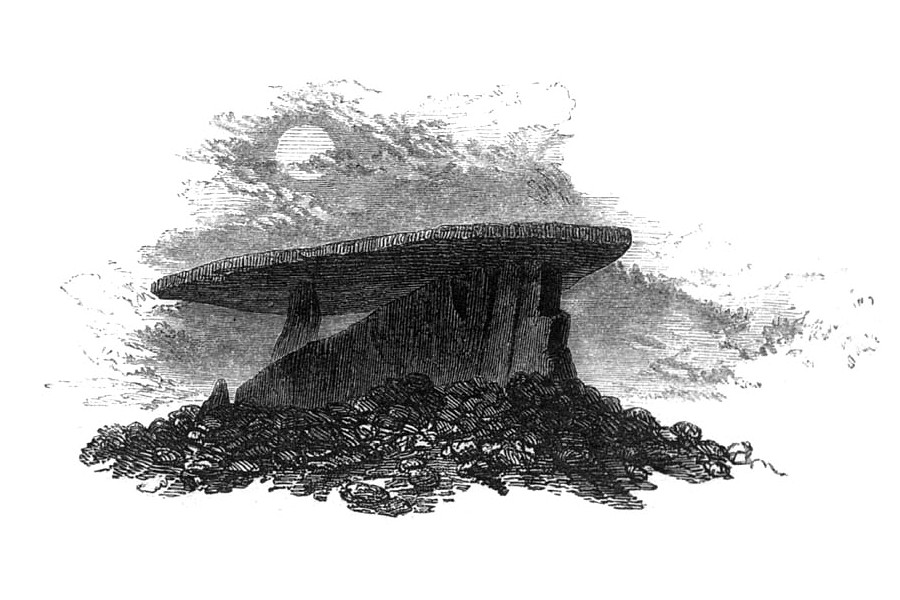
A sketch of the quoit showing the large roof as it once was (1754)

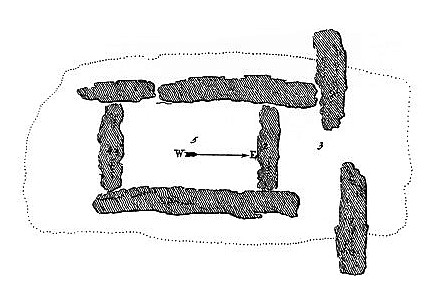
Aerial plan view by Dr. William Borlase (1769)

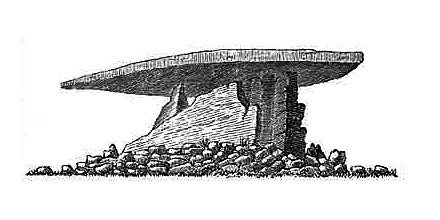
Drawing of the quoit by Dr. Borlase (1769)

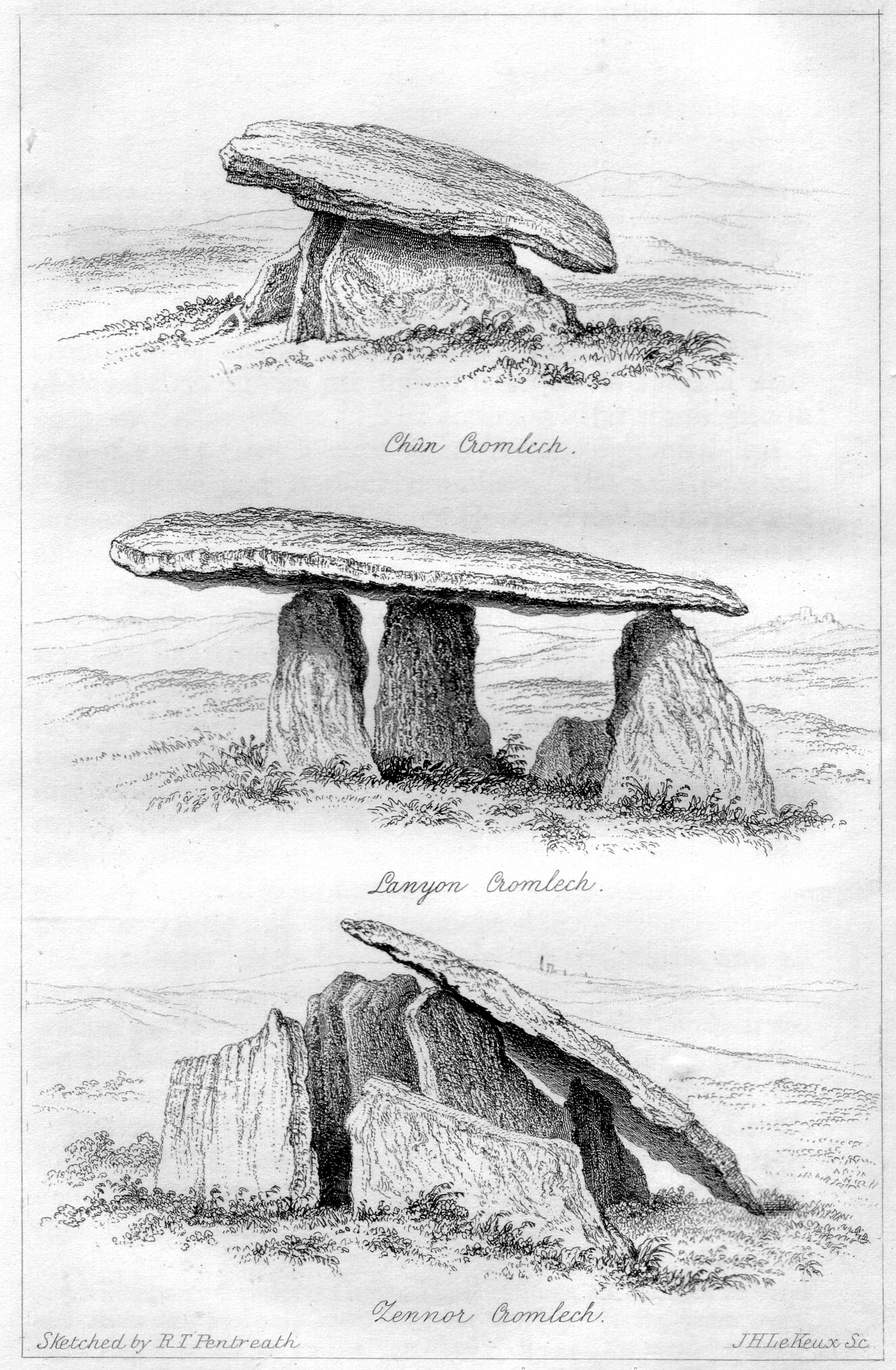
Sketches of the quoit (1857)
