= St Just in Penwith Parish Church =

Church in Cornwall, England

St Just in Penwith Parish Church, St. Just
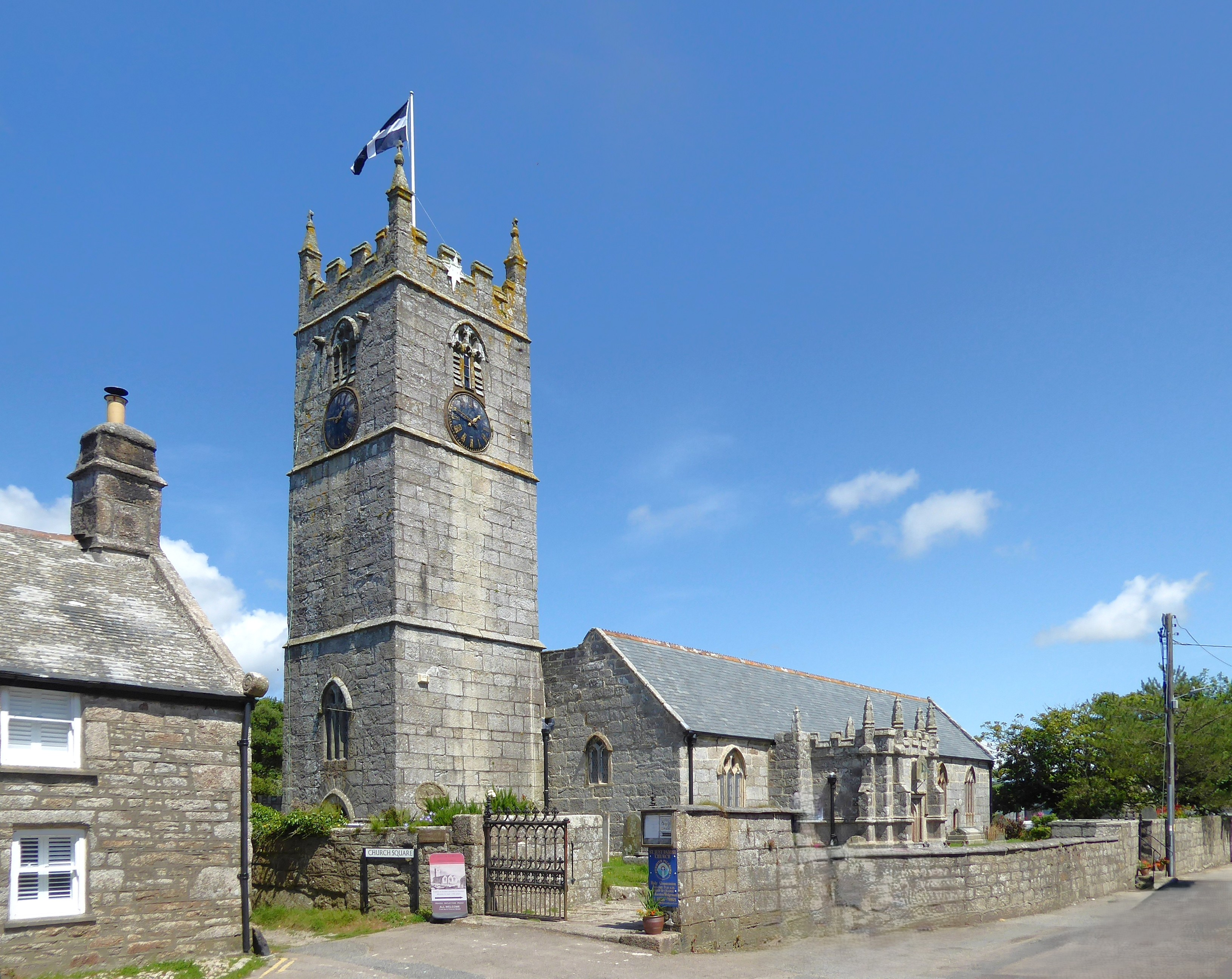
- St Just in Penwith Church, St. Just
- St Just in Penwith Parish Church, St. Just
- 50°07′29″N 05°40′44″W
- OS grid reference: SW371174
- Denomination: Church of England
- Website: www.achurchnearyou.com/saintjustchurch/

History
- Dedication: Saint Just (Yestin)

Administration
- Province: Canterbury
- Diocese: Truro
- Archdeaconry: Cornwall
- Deanery: Penwith
- Parish: St Just in Penwith, Cornwall

Clergy
- Priest: Karsten Eric Wedgewood

Listed Building – Grade II
- Official name: Parish Church of St Just
- Designated: 26 April 1950
- Reference no.: 1159637

St Just in Penwith Parish Church is a parish church in the Church of England located in St Just in Penwith, Cornwall, UK.

== History ==
The church is dedicated to St Just; in 1478 William of Worcester reported that the church enshrined the relics of Saint Justus the Martyr. Just, Justin or Yestin was a son of St Geraint.

The church of St Just is medieval. There are no remains of the early medieval church and only part of the chancel remains from the church built in 1334 which was dedicated on 13 July 1336 by the Bishop of Exeter, John Grandisson. The current building dates from the 15th-century. In 1355 the church was given to Glasney College by Sir John de Beaupre together with the church lands of Lafrowda. Medieval chapels in the parish included a chapel of St Helen at Cape Cornwall and a chapel of St Michael on Chapel Carn Brea.

== Description ==
The church is large and built of regular granite blocks. Both the body of the church and the tower are of the 15th-century and the tower is of three stages. The aisles are built to the same design with alternating windows of two different patterns. The arcades have limestone piers. The font is modern but has been described as 14th-century in date. Two medieval wall paintings remain but they are both heavily restored; one portrays St George and the other a warning to breakers of the Sabbath.

== Antiquities ==
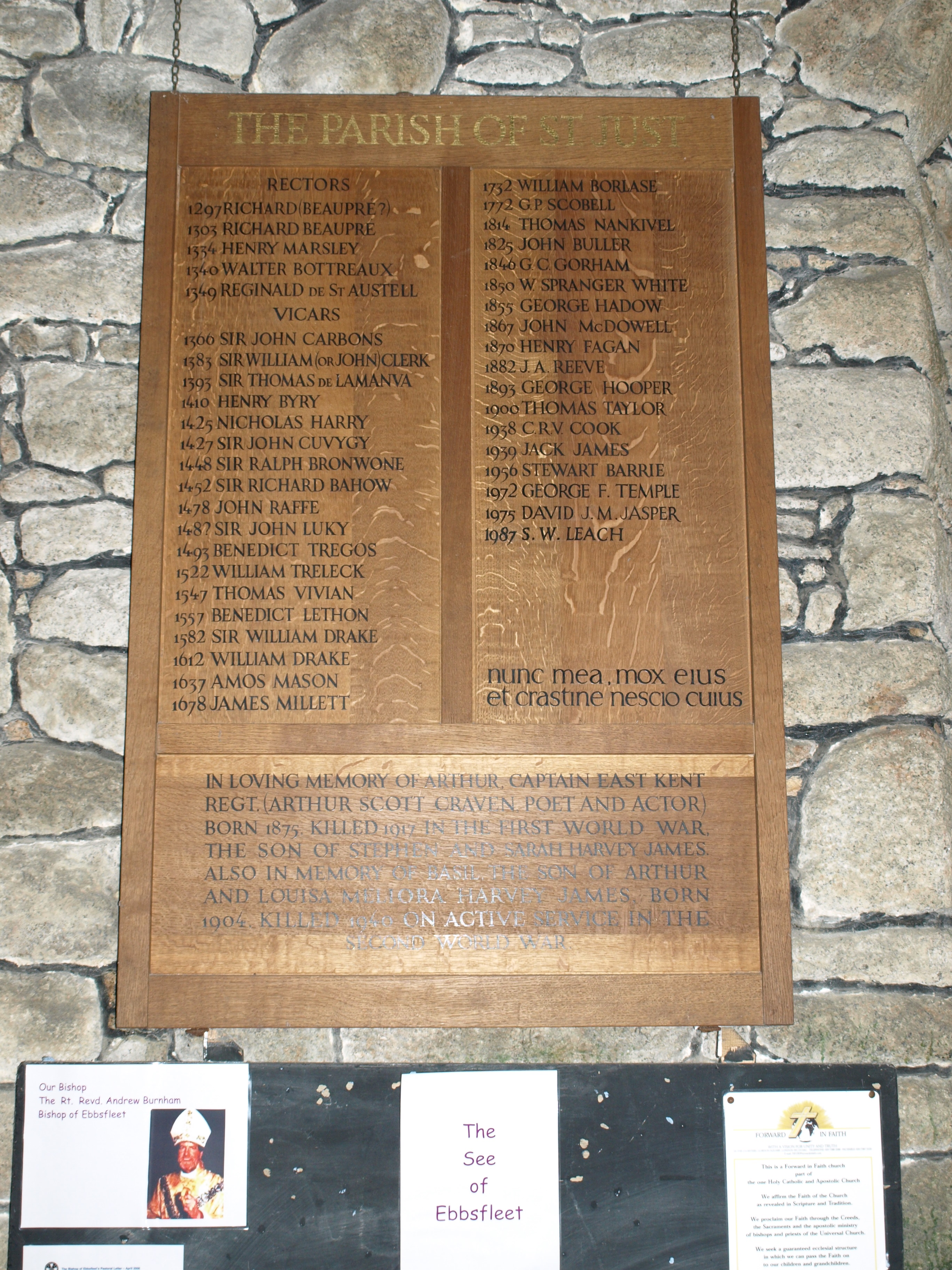
List of rectors and vicars

The Selus Stone is thought to date from the late 5th or early 6th-centuries. It bears the Latin inscription Selus Ic Iacet (Selus lies here). This is thought to refer to Salomon of Cornwall, otherwise known as Saint Selevan.

Arthur Langdon (1896) recorded the existence of seven stone crosses in the parish of St Just in Penwith, including two in the vicarage garden and two at Kenidjack. Another cross has been built into the church wall; there are also crosses at Leswidden and Nanquidno. There is a Cornish cross in the vicarage garden of Pendeen.

== Memorial ==
A memorial window to Owen Boyle, the 18-year-old lighthouse keeper who lost his life at the Longships Lighthouse on 25 October 1877, was installed in April 1879. Owen, who was overwhelmed by a wave and swept into the sea, was the fifth death since the lighthouse was completed in 1873. The glass was manufactured by Messrs Eardly and Powell of Dublin.

== Gallery ==
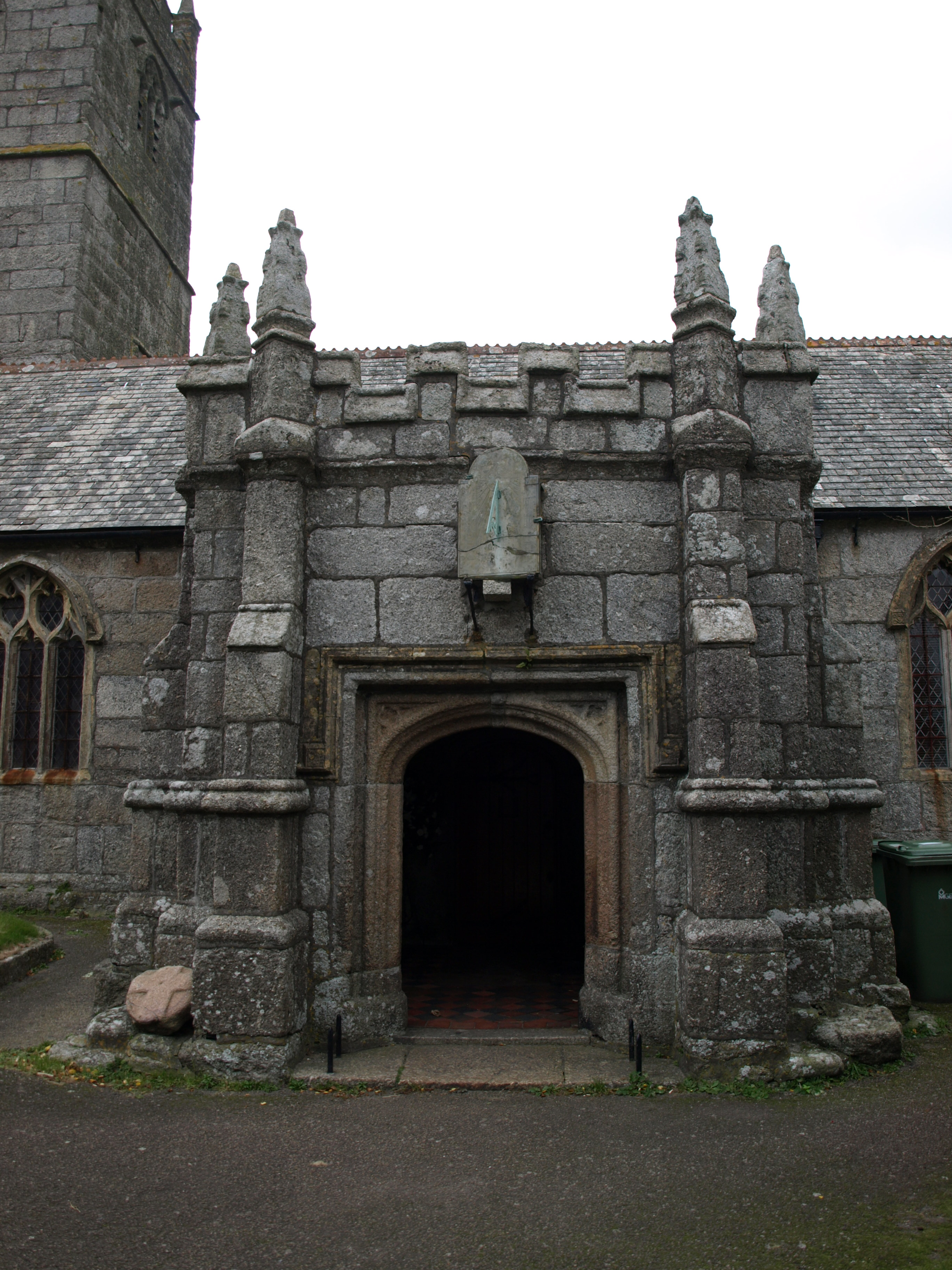
The south porch and sundial

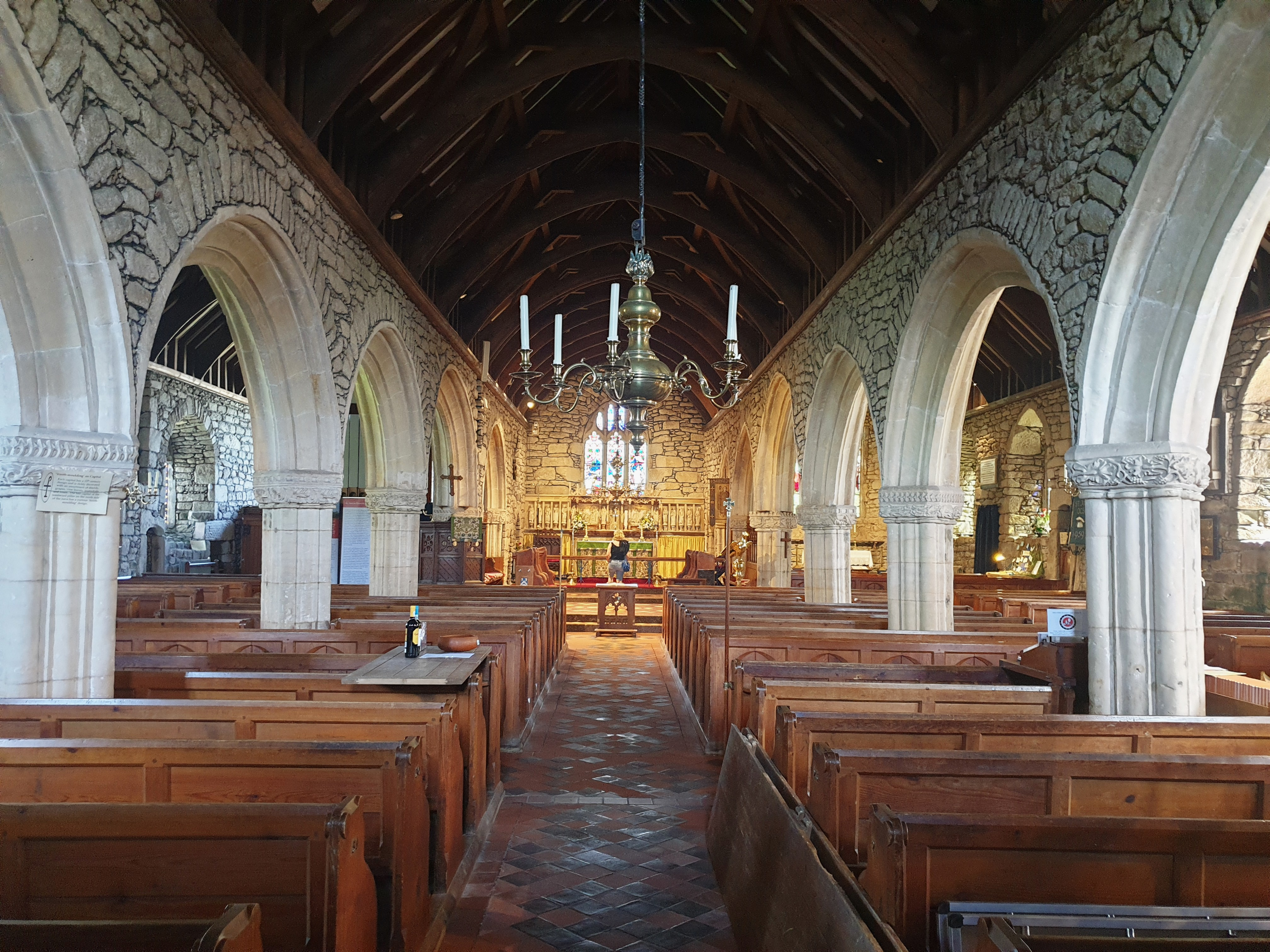
The nave

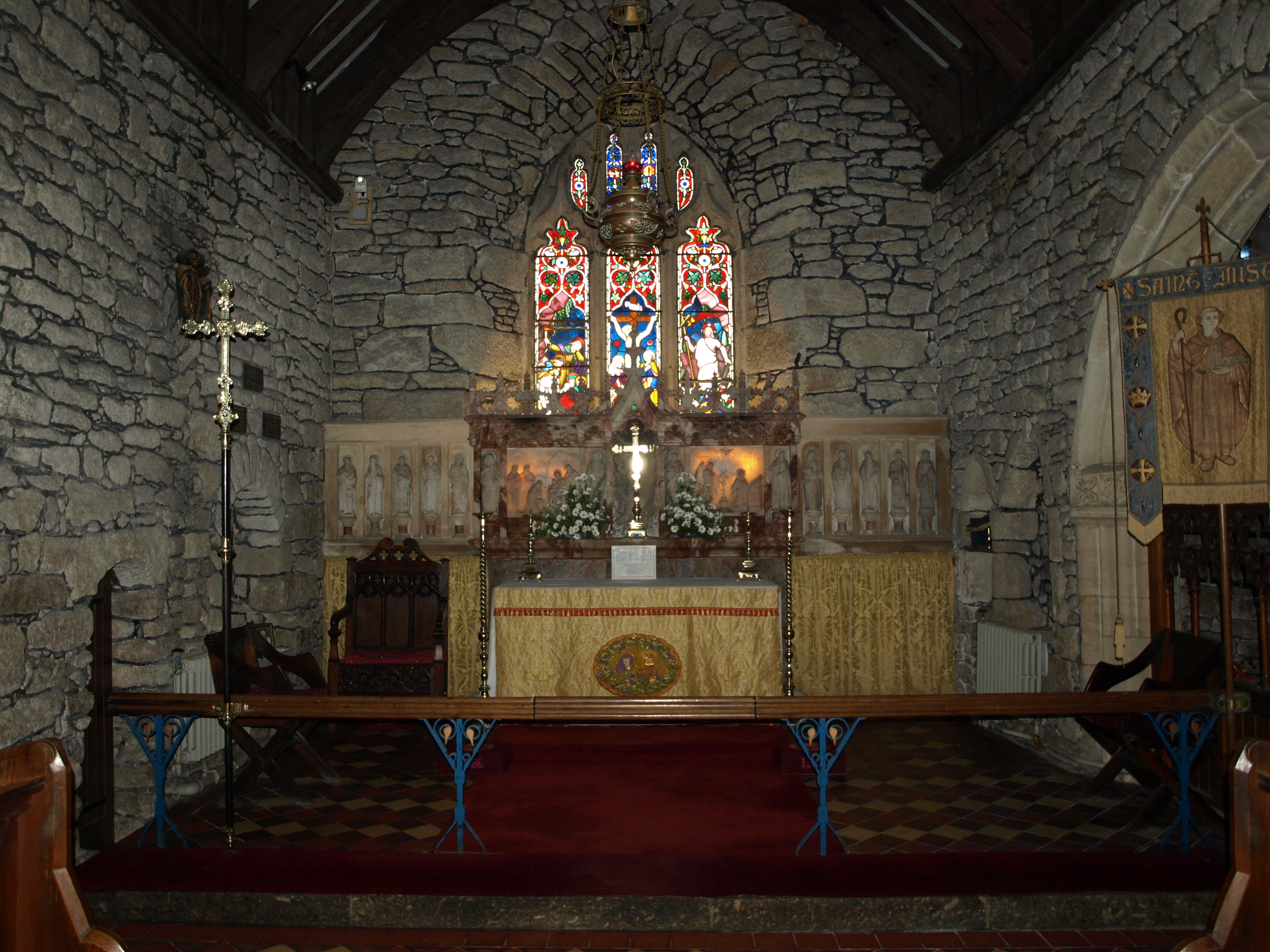
The high altar with the reredos of alabaster with fourteen Cornish saints

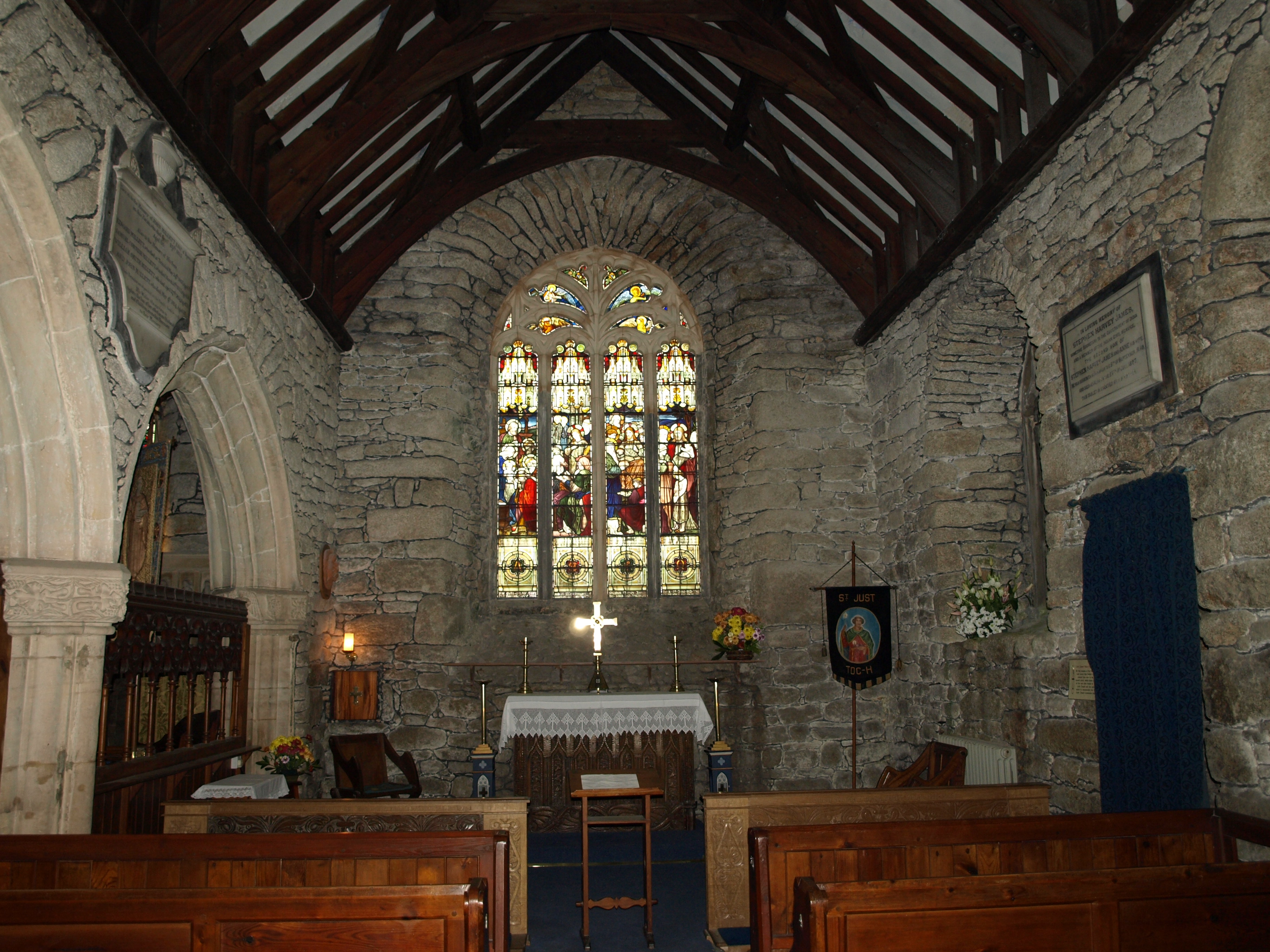
The Lady chapel in the south aisle

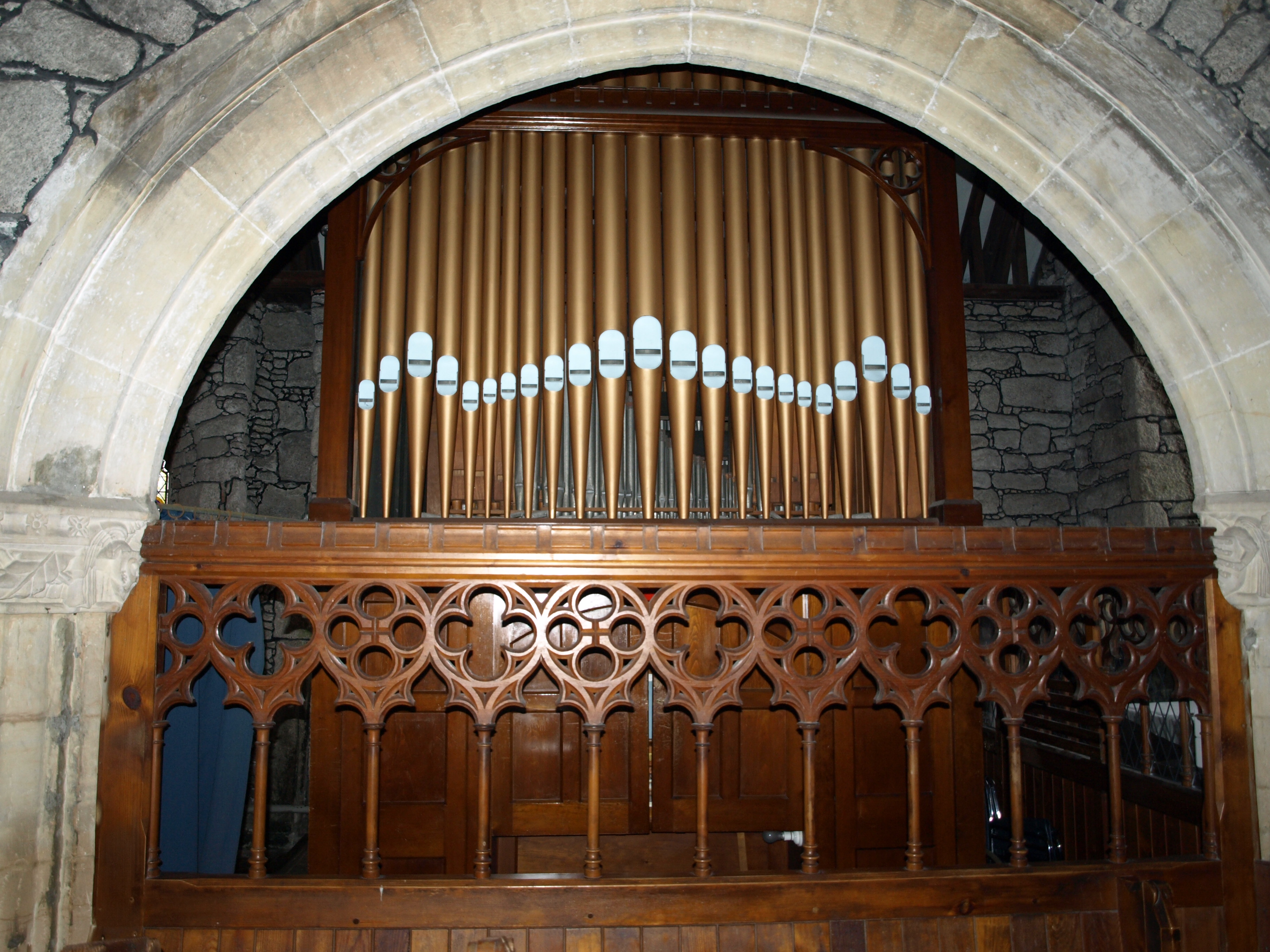
The organ

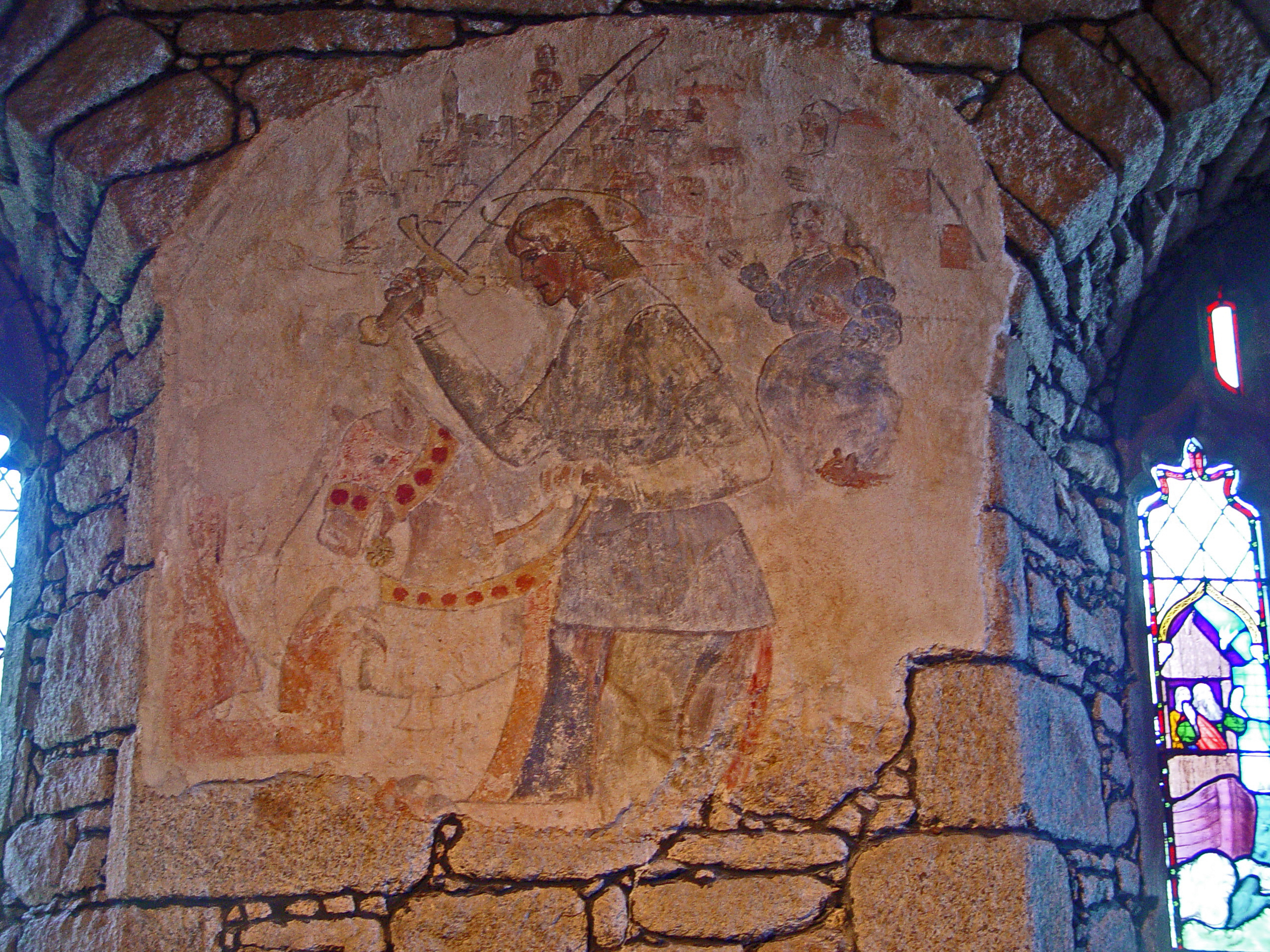
A Fresco-secco in St Just in Penwith Parish Church. This painting was created in the 15th century and depicts Saint George fighting the dragon
