= Cape Cornwall School =

- Logo for Cape Cornwall School

Location
- Cape Cornwall Road; St Just, Cornwall, TR19 7JX; England
- Coordinates: 50°07′31″N 5°41′00″W

Information
- Type: Academy
- Motto: A small school with big ambitions
- Local authority: Cornwall Council
- Trust: Truro & Penwith Academy Trust
- Department for Education URN: 146325 Tables
- Ofsted: Reports
- Chair of Governors: Mark Arnold
- Head: Jon Hall
- Gender: Coeducational
- Age: 11 to 16
- Enrolment: 270
- Houses: Kelynack, Lafrowda, Lyonesse
- Colour: Blue
- Website: http://www.cape.cornwall.sch.uk

Cape Cornwall School is a coeducational secondary school located in St Just in Penwith, Cornwall, England. As of January 2022, the school had 270 pupils aged 11 to 16 years. The Head Teacher is Jon Hall.

== The school ==
The UK Government awarded specialist Arts status to the school in 2006. The funding, which amounts to over £300,000 over four years, started in September 2006, and was spent on an art gallery 'for the school'. The Creative Arts department are pioneering the new 14-19 Diploma of Creative Media.

In December 2010, Cape Cornwall School's History department was inspected by Ofsted and assessed as outstanding.

In May 2012, it was announced that Cape Cornwall School had reached the final four for the 'Cook For The Queen' competition at Buckingham Palace to celebrate the Diamond Jubilee.

Cape Cornwall School was formerly part of the 'Penwith Education Trust' and therefore had foundation school 'Cooperative Trust Status', meaning the school had links and shared facilities with other local secondary and primary schools.

In 2012, Cape Cornwall School received funding from The Belling Foundation, a charitable trust from the electronics firm Belling, to improve their ICT suites.

In September 2012, a new school uniform was introduced: a blue blazer with white shirt and blue striped tie. The traditional Sky Blue and Navy tie has been worn since the founding of the school. The uniform was democratically voted for by the students, staff and parents. The new uniform was made compulsory for all 2012 Year 7 students, and is being slowly introduced in other years. Quality issues with this initial blue blazer meant that the uniform manufacturer replaced these blazers for black replacements.

In 2017, the school was classed as Inadequate by OFSTED. The school then converted to academy status and is now sponsored by the Truro and Penwith Academy Trust.

Mrs Jan Woodhouse is currently the Executive Headteacher, with Mr Jon Hall as Head Teacher. In 2021 it was announced that the Governors had decided to appoint Mr Jon Hall as the new Head of School and have subsequently appointed Jon as the Head Teacher.

In June 2022, Cape Cornwall School became a pilot school for the Trust's 1:1 student iPad project, with every student being assigned their own iPad to enhance their learning.

== Houses ==
The school has three houses: Kelynack (named after the local settlement), Lafrowda (a small area of St Just and the name of the local festival) and Lyonesse (a fictional county in Arthurian legend which has strong Celtic links). The houses are mainly used for organising sports teams within the school. Houses are different from tutor/form groups, however each tutor/form group is assigned a different house which they support. They all compete against each other every year on sports day to earn a cup.
