= Old Town Hall, St Just =

Municipal building in St Just in Penwith, Cornwall, England

Old Town Hall
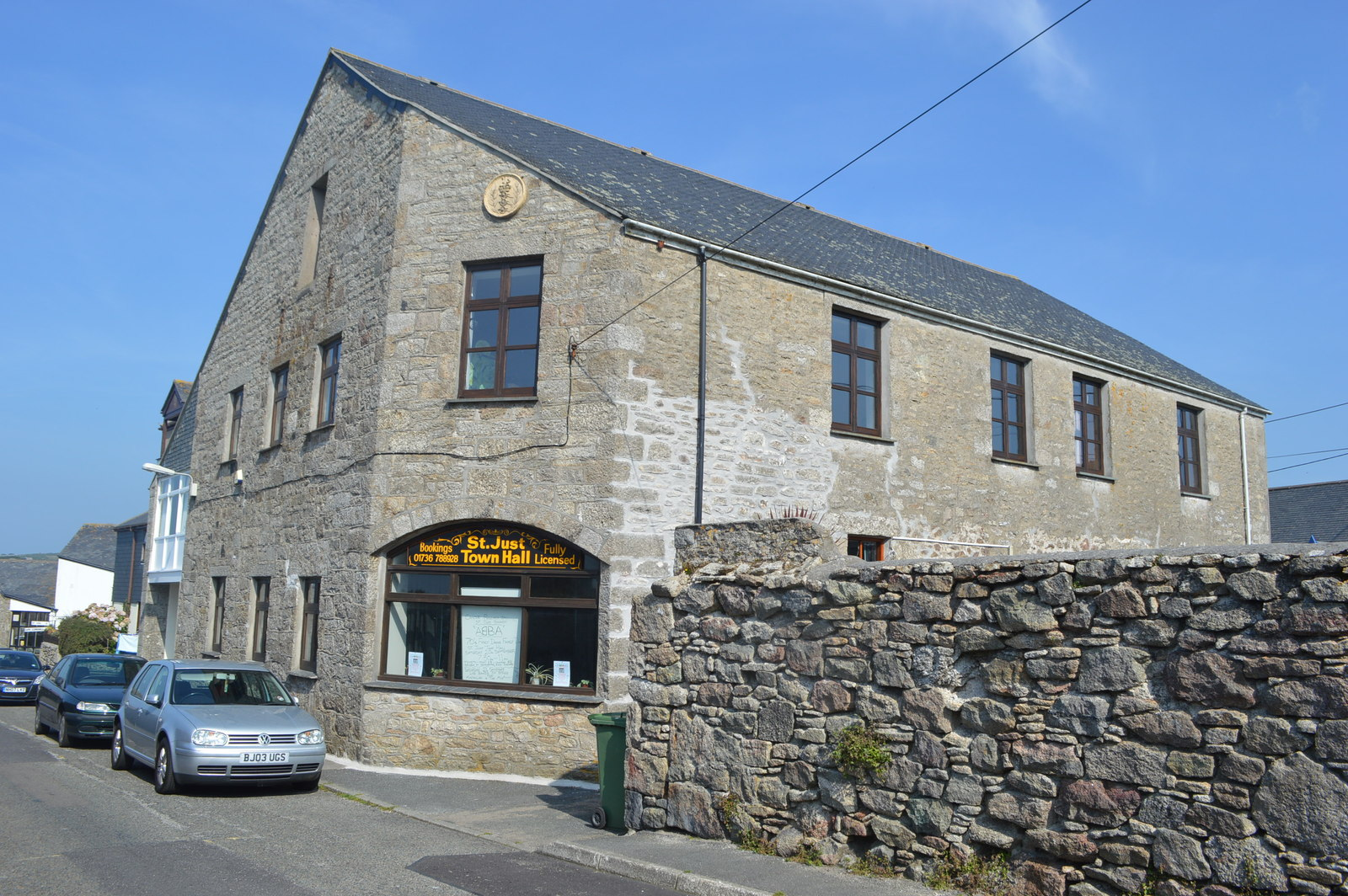
- The building in 2014

- Shown in Cornwall
- 50.1259°N 5.6816°W
- Location: Chapel Street, St Just in Penwith

History
- Built: 1862

Site notes
- Architectural style: Victorian Free style

The Old Town Hall is a former municipal building on Chapel Road in St Just in Penwith, a town in Cornwall, in England. The building, which was in municipal use for much of the 20th century, is now managed as a community venue.

== History ==
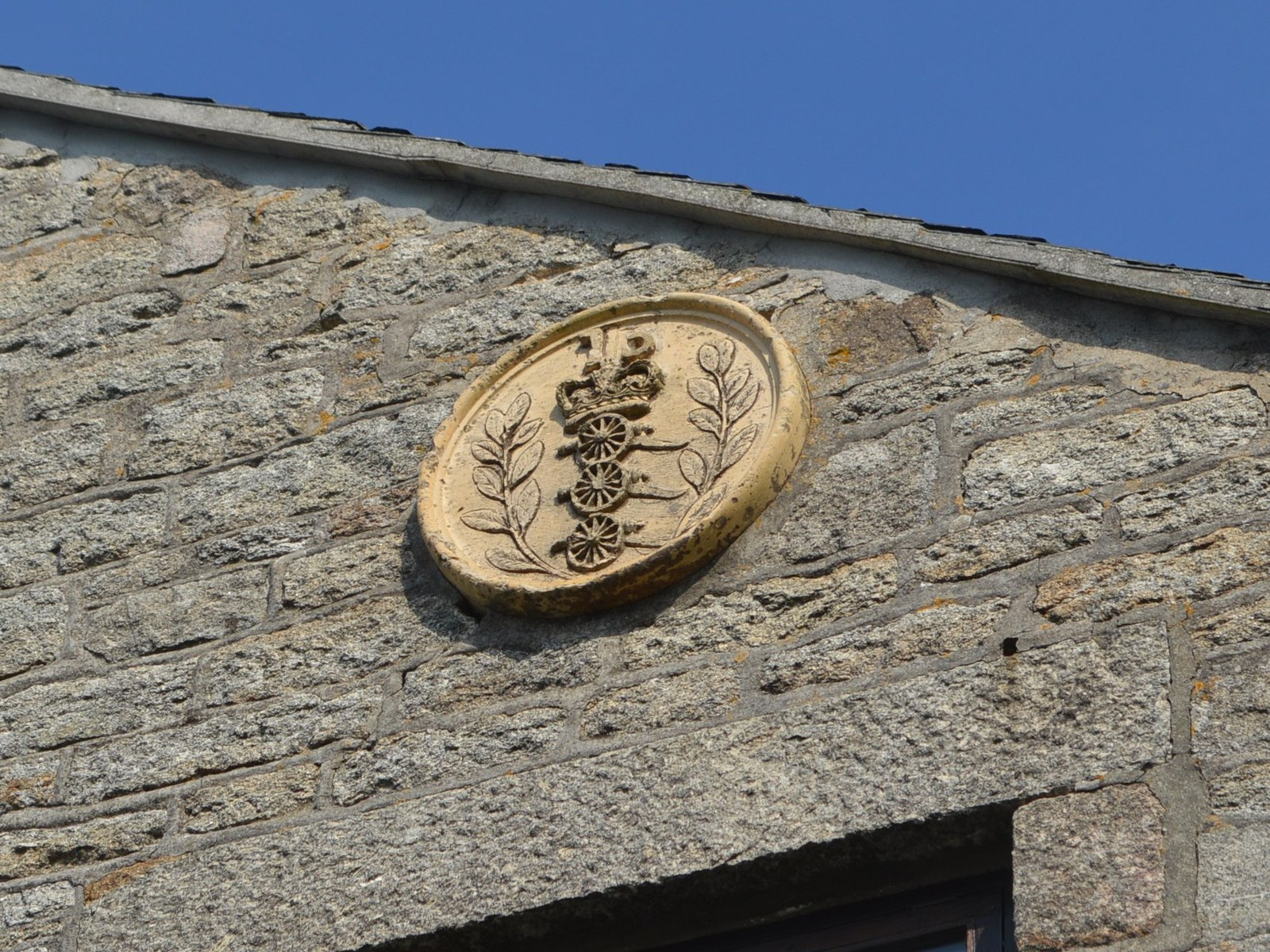
The roundel in the gable

The building was commissioned as a drill hall for the 1st Cornwall (Duke of Cornwall's) Artillery Volunteers, which was raised in Cornwall in response to the threat of a French invasion. It consisted of thirteen Artillery Volunteer Corps and the last numbered of these was the 13th (St Just) Cornwall Artillery Volunteer Corps, which was raised in St Just in Penwith on 26 September 1862.

The drill hall was designed in the Victorian Free style, built in local granite and was completed in late 1862. The design involved a canted main frontage at the southwest corner of the building. The frontage was fenestrated with a Diocletian window on the ground floor and a single casement window on the first floor. Above that, in the swept back section of the gable, there was a small roundel containing three artillery pieces surrounded by olive leaves and surmounted by the number "13", identifying the corps which it accommodated. The design of the Chapel Road frontage involved three bays fenestrated by cross-windows on both floors, while the side elevation of four bays was fenestrated in a similar style but with a doorway in the first bay. It was a substantial two-storey stone building, which has been described by the Drill Hall Project as "of no great architectural merit".

The 13th (St Just) Cornwall Artillery Volunteer Corps formed the guard of honour for a visit by the Prince and Princess of Wales to Botallack Mine in 1867. The unit was re-designated No. 10 Battery, Duke of Cornwall Artillery Volunteers in May 1880, but was then absorbed into No. 9 Battery at Marazion in 1883. During the First World War, the building was used as a drill hall for No. 2 Heavy Battery, Cornwall Royal Garrison Artillery – Defended Ports, which was responsible for coastal defence.

An additional drill hall was built at Carn Bosavern on the southern edge of the town in 1911. The two buildings were then used concurrently until 1939, when another drill hall was built alongside the 1911 building. The Chapel Road building then became surplus to requirements and was sold to St Just Urban District Council. The council converted the building into its town hall, serving both as its offices and meeting place, with the main hall being used for public entertainments. The council's first meeting in the Chapel Road building was held on 3 May 1939.

The building continued to serve as the local seat of government for much of the 20th century, and, following local government re-organisation in 1974, continued to be used by Penwith District Council as an office for the delivery of local services, and by St Just in Penwith Town Council as their meeting place. However, following the introduction of unitary authorities in 2009, Penwith District Council was abolished and, by 2010, the St Just in Penwith Town Council had relocated to new offices at No.1 Chapel Street, also known as "Bank House". Since then, the old town hall has been managed by St Just Community ABC as a community venue.
