= Chapel Carn Brea =

Granite outcrop in west Cornwall, England

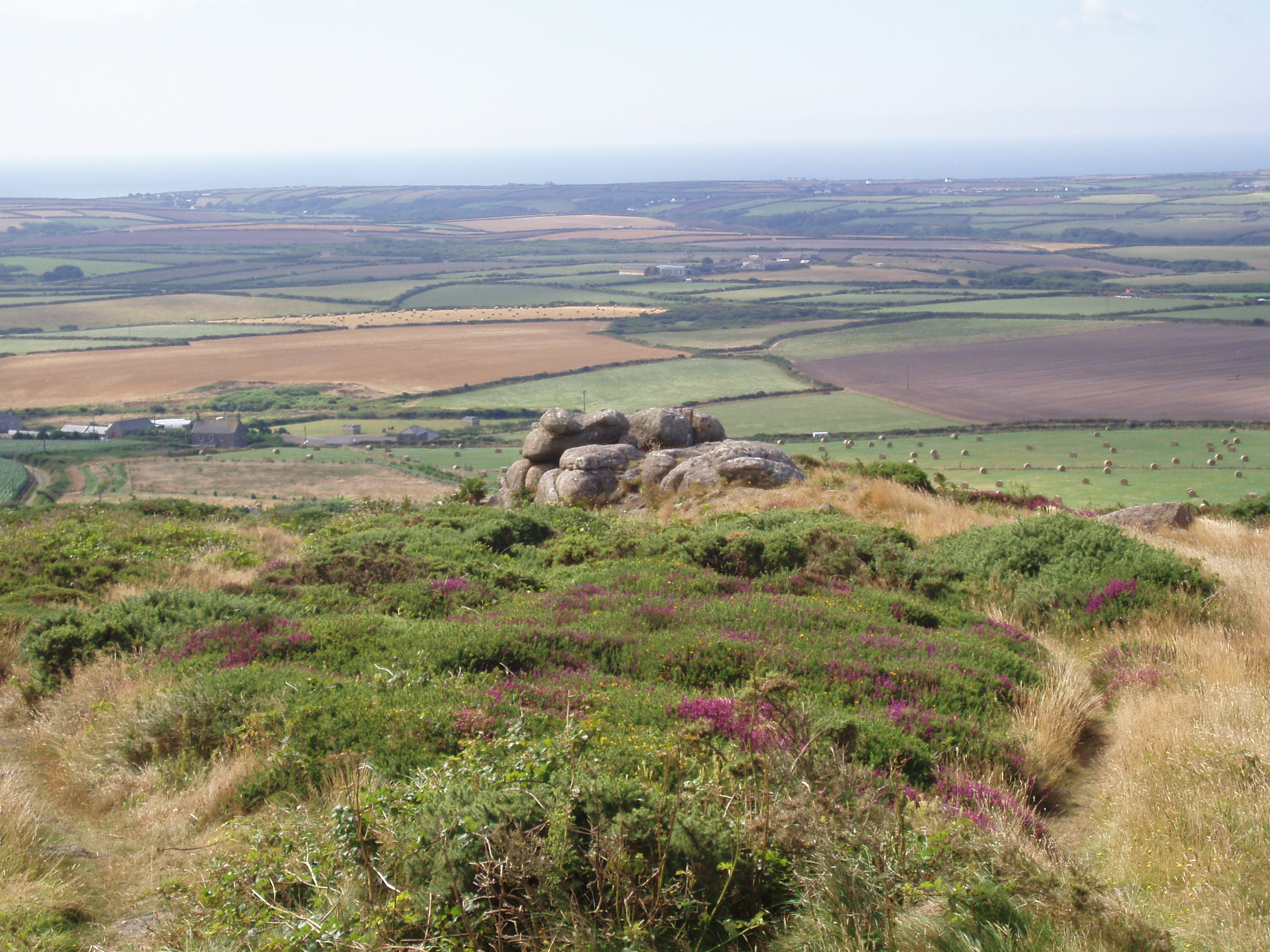
- View from Chapel Carn Brea towards St Levan

Highest point
- Elevation: 198 m (650 ft)
- Prominence: 30 m (98 ft)
- Parent peak: Watch Croft
- Listing: Tump
- Coordinates: 50.094°N 5.657°W

Naming
- Native name: Chapel Karn Bre (Cornish)

Geography
- Location: Penwith, Cornwall, UK
- OS grid: SW385280
- Topo map: OS Landranger 203

Chapel Carn Brea (Cornish: Chapel Karn Bre) is an elevated Hercynian granite outcrop, owned by the National Trust at the southern edge of the civil parish of St Just, Cornwall, England, United Kingdom. The hill is 5 kilometres (3.1 mi) south of St Just and 3.5 kilometres (2.2 mi) east of Sennen Cove, and just to the north of the A30 London to Land's End road, which runs through the village of Crows-an-Wra. It should not be confused with another Carn Brea, the hill overlooking the Camborne–Redruth area.

Chapel Carn Brea is often described as the first hill in Cornwall (from a westerly perspective) and rises 198 metres (650 ft) above sea level.

== History ==
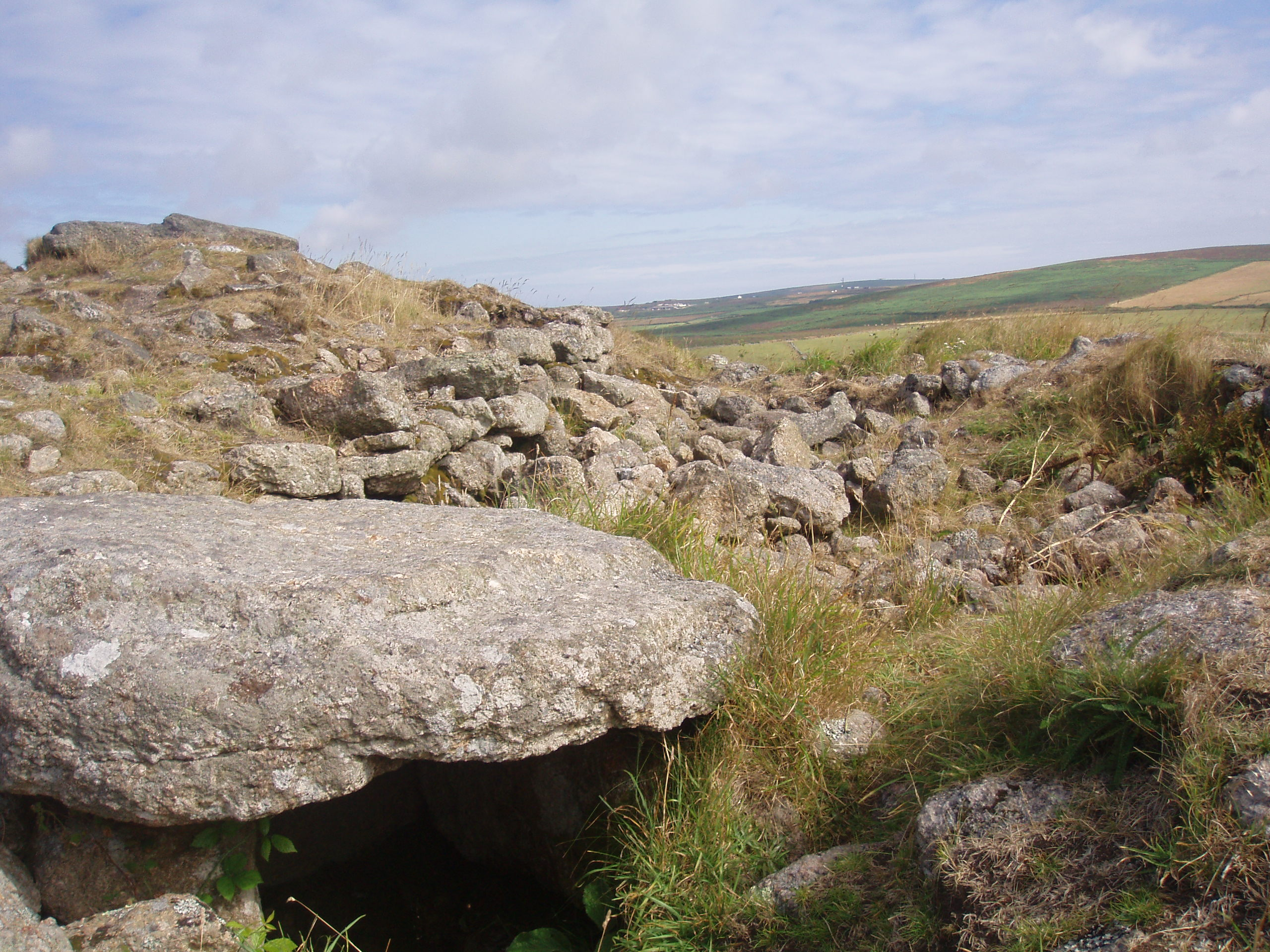
Neolithic remains at the summit of Chapel Carn Brea

The hill is an important historical site showing evidence of Neolithic and early Bronze Age activity, as well as the remains of the thirteenth century chapel from which it is named. On the slopes and summit there were once eleven barrows, but only seven now remain, mostly in a poor state. To the west of the summit is an early Neolithic long cairn with dimensions of 11 metres (36 ft) long and built within a natural granite outcrop which extends it length by 26 metres (85 ft).

On the summit is a 9 metres (30 ft) diameter entrance grave (also known as chambered cairn) which had a south-facing entrance and was built in the late Neolithic. The chamber was 2.7 metres (8.9 ft) long, 1.1 metres (3.6 ft) wide and 1.2 metres (3.9 ft) high. This type of cairn is unique to west Cornwall and the Isles of Scilly, and consist of a long narrow chamber covered with large slabs and surrounded with a kerb of large stones; they are thought to be communal burial places. The entrance grave was later covered by a large cairn 4.6 metres (15 ft) high and 19 metres (62 ft) across with three concentric retaining walls and a secondary cist. The chapel, which was built on top of the cairn, was pulled down in 1816 and was said to be the home of holy men or monks. A manuscript from 1396 kept at the County Records Office, Truro records the ′beaconage′ received from fishermen for the burning an ′ecclesiastical light′, normally a brazier or fire basket at the ″Chapel of St Michael of Bree″. This is the earliest record of a navigational light in Cornwall. In 1868 and 1879 William Copeland Borlase excavated the site and built a new cairn which was destroyed by the building of a Second World War radar observation post, which was manned by the Royal Air Force. A plaque, near the car park is dedicated to those that served there.

The Old Cornwall Society continues to light a beacon fire for the summer solstice on 23 June each year.

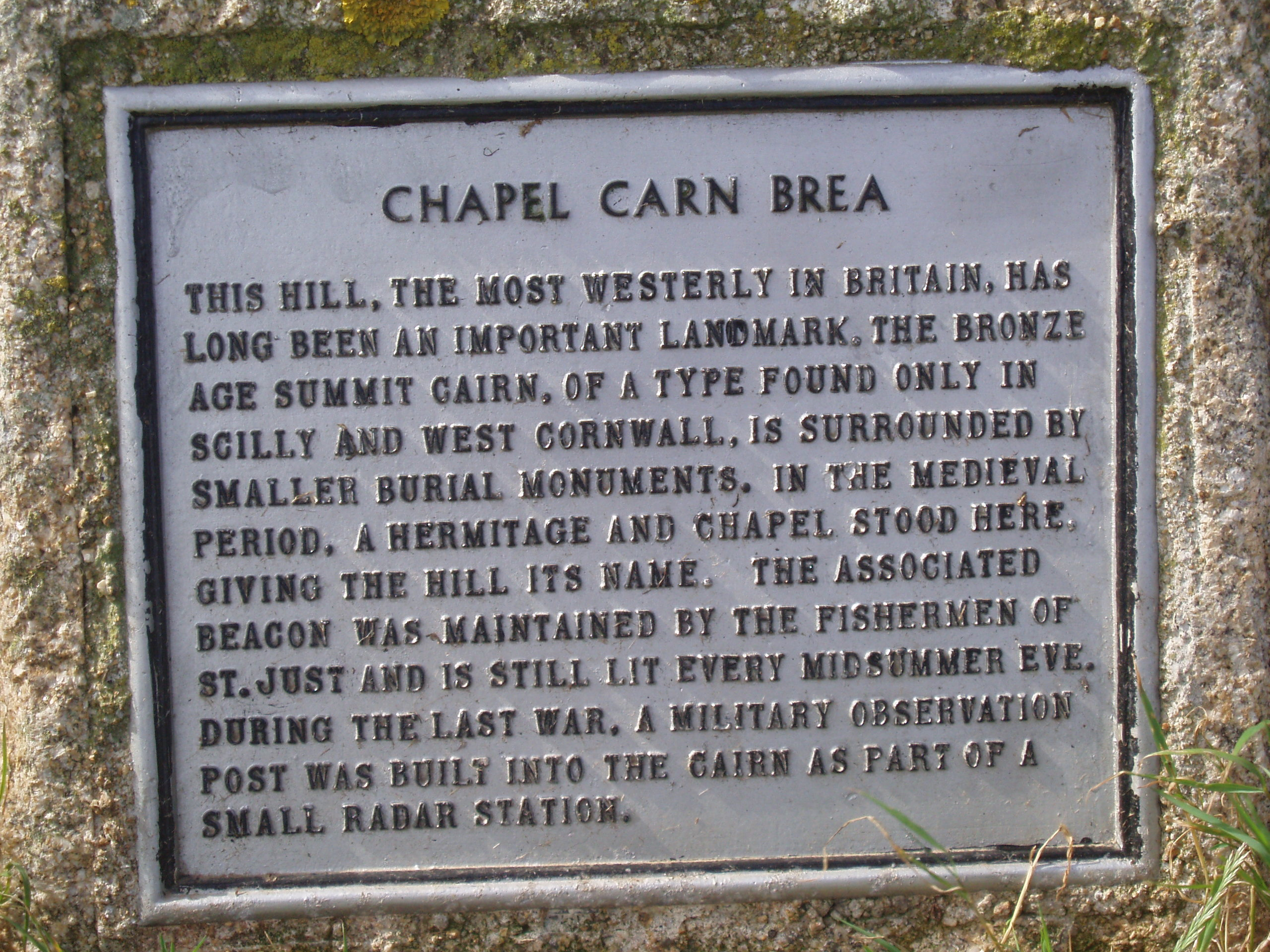
Plaque on Chapel Carn Brea

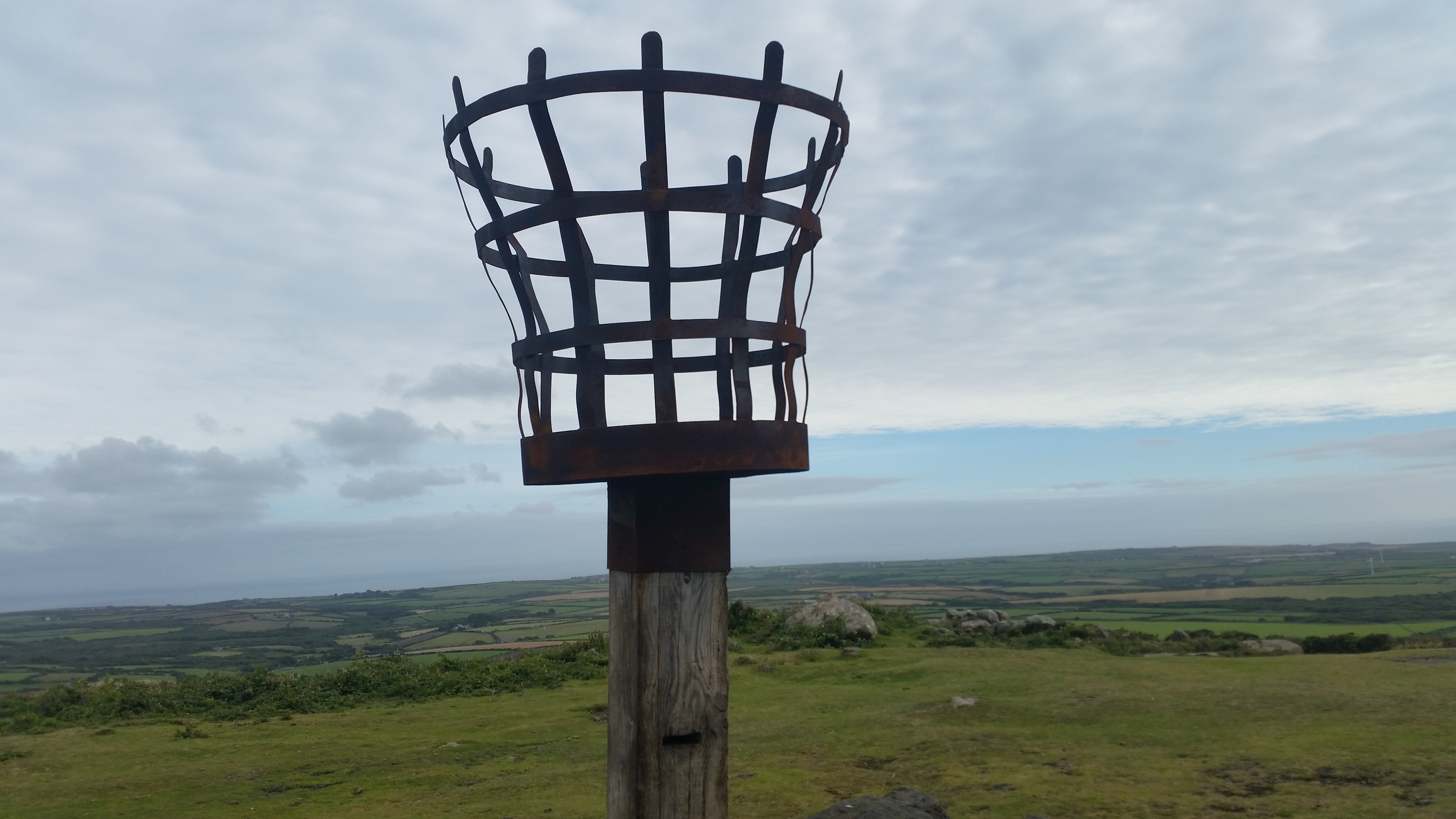
Mid-summer beacon
