= Wheal Owles =

Former tin mine in west Cornwall, England

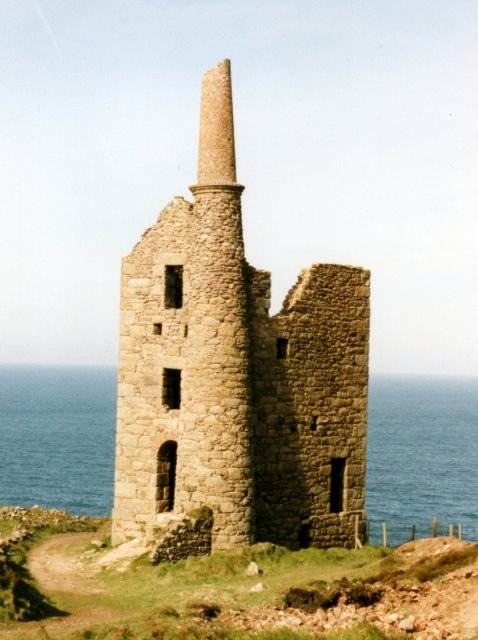
- Engine house

- Location within Cornwall
- 50°8′3″N 5°41′16″W
- Type: industrial heritage, mine

UNESCO World Heritage Site
- Type: Cultural
- Criteria: ii, iii, iv
- Designated: 2006 (30th session)
- Part of: Cornwall and West Devon Mining Landscape
- Reference no.: 1215
- Region: Western Europe

Listed Building – Grade II
- Official name: Cargodna Pumping House, West Wheal Owles
- Designated: 22 October 1993
- Reference no.: 1115109

Wheal Owles (Cornish: Hwel Als) was a tin mine in the parish of St Just in Cornwall, UK and the site of a disaster in 1893 when twenty miners lost their lives. Since 2006 it has been part of the UNESCO World Heritage Site – Cornwall and West Devon Mining Landscape. The mine is within the Aire Point to Carrick Du Site of Special Scientific Interest (SSSI) and the South West Coast Path passes along the cliff.

== History ==
The mine was commenced by John Boyns, in circa 1830 on earlier workings, with Wheal Boys first opened, and shortly after the Growse. Water was drained from old workings by a steam engine but little ore was found and it was some years before a profit was made. In 1836, 131 people were employed there, 110 men and 21 women. Driving eastwards, towards the Botallack Mine, the Cercendrey and Cargotha lodes were intersected and a large amount of tin was raised. Wheal Boys also eventually produced a large amount of tin. At one time the mine employed around 500 people and is over 200 fathoms (1,200 ft; 370 m) deep. At a general meeting of the shareholders on 8 March 1884 it was decided to close the older part of the mine and to carry on mining the cliff part of the mine. Over 100 tons of ore was processed each month but due to the low price of tin the mine was making a loss.

On 10 January 1893 the miners broke through into the flooded workings of the neighbouring Wheal Drea. As water rushed into Wheal Owles the air blasted through the mine blowing out the lights and leaving the miners in darkness. Those working in the upper levels survived but nineteen men and a boy lost their lives. Their bodies were never recovered.

"... a terrible roar was heard, followed by a rush of wind, which blew out all the lights. Knowing that something had gone wrong in the mine, the men made for the ladders, and soon found out it was a case of hurry and strain every nerve for life or death. In the dark they did their best to gain the surface, some at times being completely torn away from the ladders by the tremendous currents of water and wind.... In about an hour and a half that huge space was completely full."

Wheal Owles mine had been flooded by waters from Boscean mine which had broken into Wheal Drea.

"The result is that the immense pool of water now stretched through, practically, three mines and is a mile-and-a-half in length - almost from the sea to beneath the Wesleyan Chapel at St Just Church-town."

== In Media ==
The Wheal Owles mine was used as a filming location for many scenes in the popular 2015 TV show Poldark, in which the Wheal Owles mine depicts a fictional copper mine called Wheal Leisure, owned by main character Ross Poldark.
