= Kelynack =

Hamlet in west Cornwall, England

Coordinates: 50.1115°N 5.6791°W

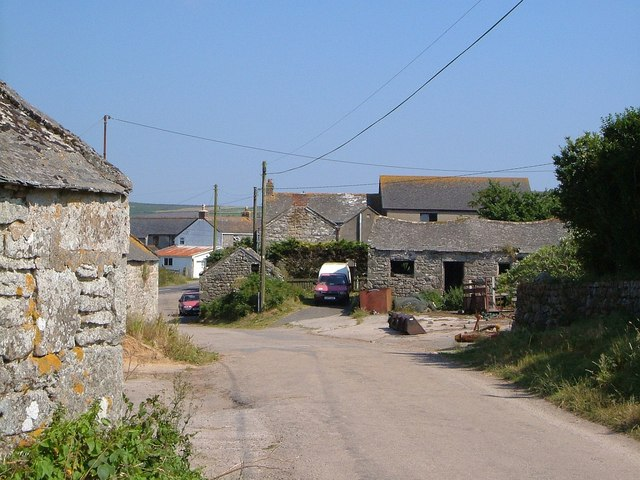
Kelynack

Kelynack (/kəˈlɪnək/; from Cornish: Kelinek) is a settlement in west Cornwall, England, UK.

== Geography ==
Kelynack is on the Penwith peninsula approximately four miles (6 km) north north-east of Land's End and one mile (1.6 km) south of St Just. It lies along the B3306 road which connects St Ives to the A30 road, and is the last settlement before the road joins the A30. Kelynack lies within the Cornwall Area of Outstanding Natural Beauty (AONB). Almost a third of Cornwall has AONB designation, with the same status and protection as a National Park. Kelynack is also the name of one of the three school houses at Cape Cornwall School.

== Toponymy ==
First recorded in the Domesday Book as Chelenoc, then Kelkennek (1284), Kellenyek (1286), Kellenek (1300), Kelleynek (1302), Kellenick (1346), Kalynack (1589 and 1732), Killenick (1842).

It is a Brittonic place-name in -ōgon, suffix meaning "place of" > Welsh -og, Old Breton -oc > Breton -ec [-eg], from Proto-Celtic *-ako- like Gaulish -acon > -acum > -ac, -ay, -ey

meaning "abundant with holly" or more commonly "holly grove"., same as Breton Quelneuc "place of the holly-trees, holly-tree grove".

== History ==
Kelynack was mentioned in the Domesday Book where it was listed as Chelenoc, and as the Tithing of Kelynack in the Assize Rolls of 1284.

Kelynack Board School (grid reference SW375294) was opened on 2 June 1880 with accommodation for one hundred children. In November 1882 a government inspector reported that the ″scholars are very neat and well-conducted; they are, of course, very backward; but a good beginning has been made.″
