= Ballowall Barrow =

Prehistoric tomb in Cornwall, UK

- Krug Karrekloos (Cornish)
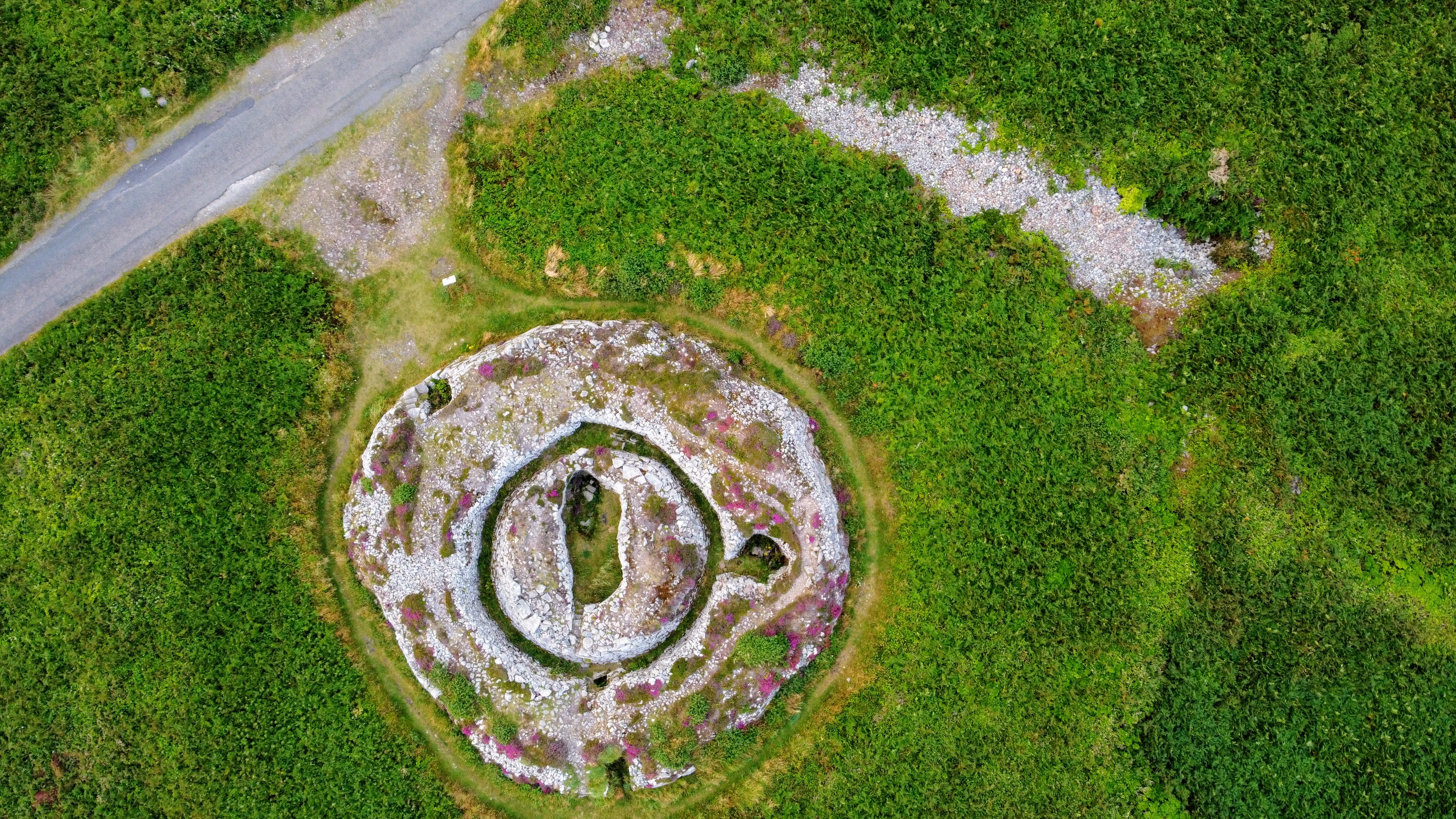
- Ballowall Barrow

- Location within Southwest Cornwall
- 50.122306°N 5.701361°W
- Type: Chambered tomb
- Location: St Just, Cornwall grid reference SW354313

Site notes
- Owner: English Heritage
- Public access: Yes

Scheduled monument
- Official name: The Ballowall Barrow incorporating entrance grave, cairn, ritual pits and cists 420m WSW of Bollowal Farm
- Designated: 10 August 1923
- Reference no.: 1013666

Ballowall Barrow (Cornish: Krug Karrekloos) is a prehistoric funerary cairn (chambered tomb) which Ashbee (1982) and Hencken (1902–81) state contains several phases of use from the Neolithic to the Bronze Age. It is situated on the cliff top at Ballowall Common, near St Just in Cornwall, England, UK. It is also known as Carn Gluze Barrow.

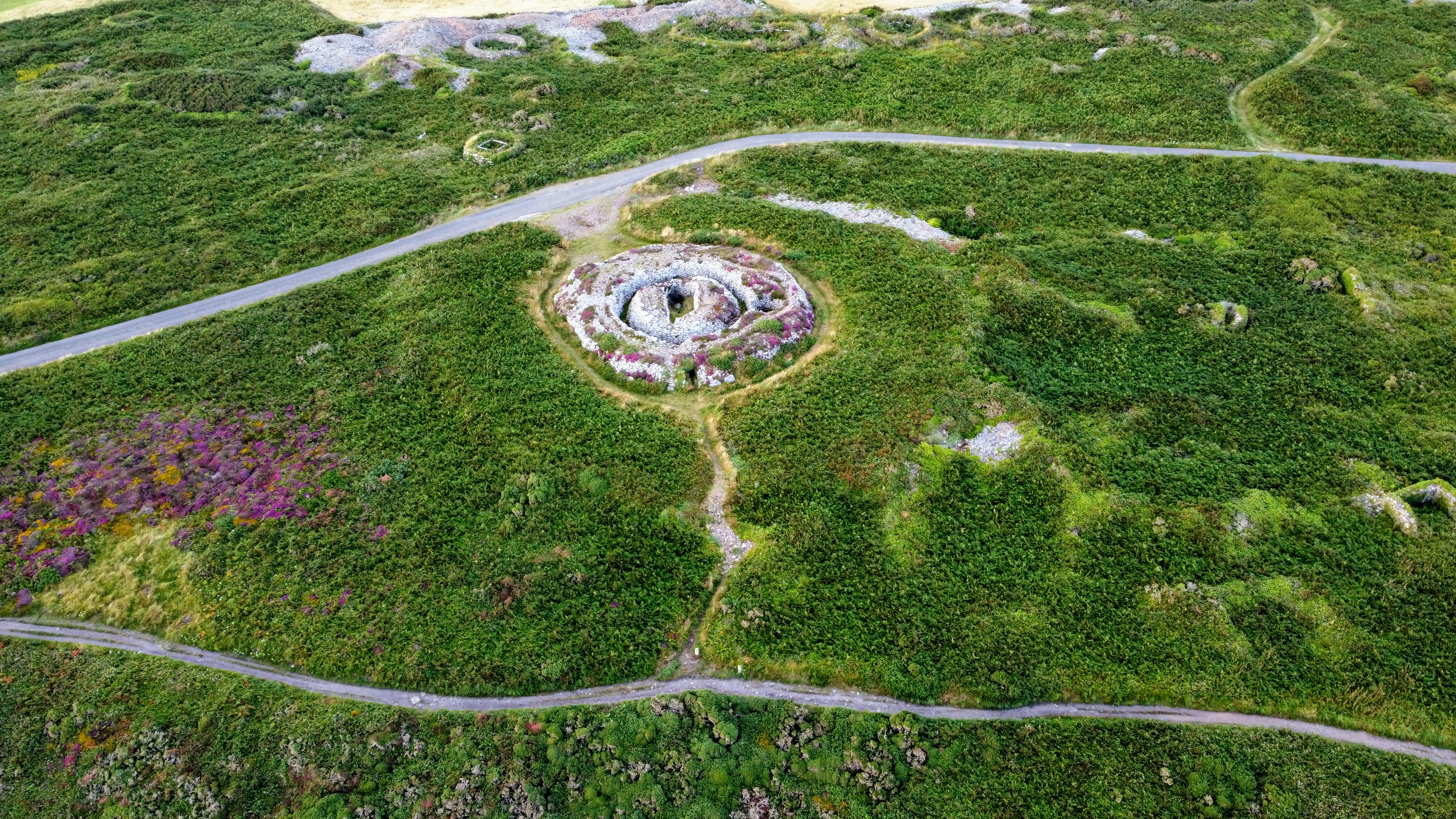
Bollowal Barrow from above

It was first excavated in 1878 by William Copeland Borlase, when it was discovered under mining debris. A report by Sharpe (1999) states that there are several discrepancies in the accounts of the excavation work, some of the finds were lost and interpretation of the site is difficult. Reconstruction work which was done after the excavation to make the inside more accessible has further complicated the site. The site today is a confused mix of original and reconstructions introduced by Borlase. The finds from excavations are in stored in museums at Truro, Cambridge and the British Museum

The barrow is 72 feet (22 m) in diameter. The Cornwall and Scilly Historic Environment Record describes it as a central domed structure, containing cists and with a pit beneath, surrounded by an outer cairn also containing cists. An entrance grave is located in the external side of the outer cairn.

The construction of the site is unique in consisting of a combination of Neolithic and Bronze Age funerary rituals. A similar site was recorded by Borlase but its location has been lost.

The site is a protected Scheduled monument (ref. number 15410). It was included in the Schedule on 10/8/1923 and the scheduling was updated on 22/2/1996. The site is in the guardianship of English Heritage, and is managed by the National Trust.
