= St Just in Penwith =

Town in Cornwall, England

Coordinates: 50.124°N 5.680°W

St Just: Cornish: Lannust
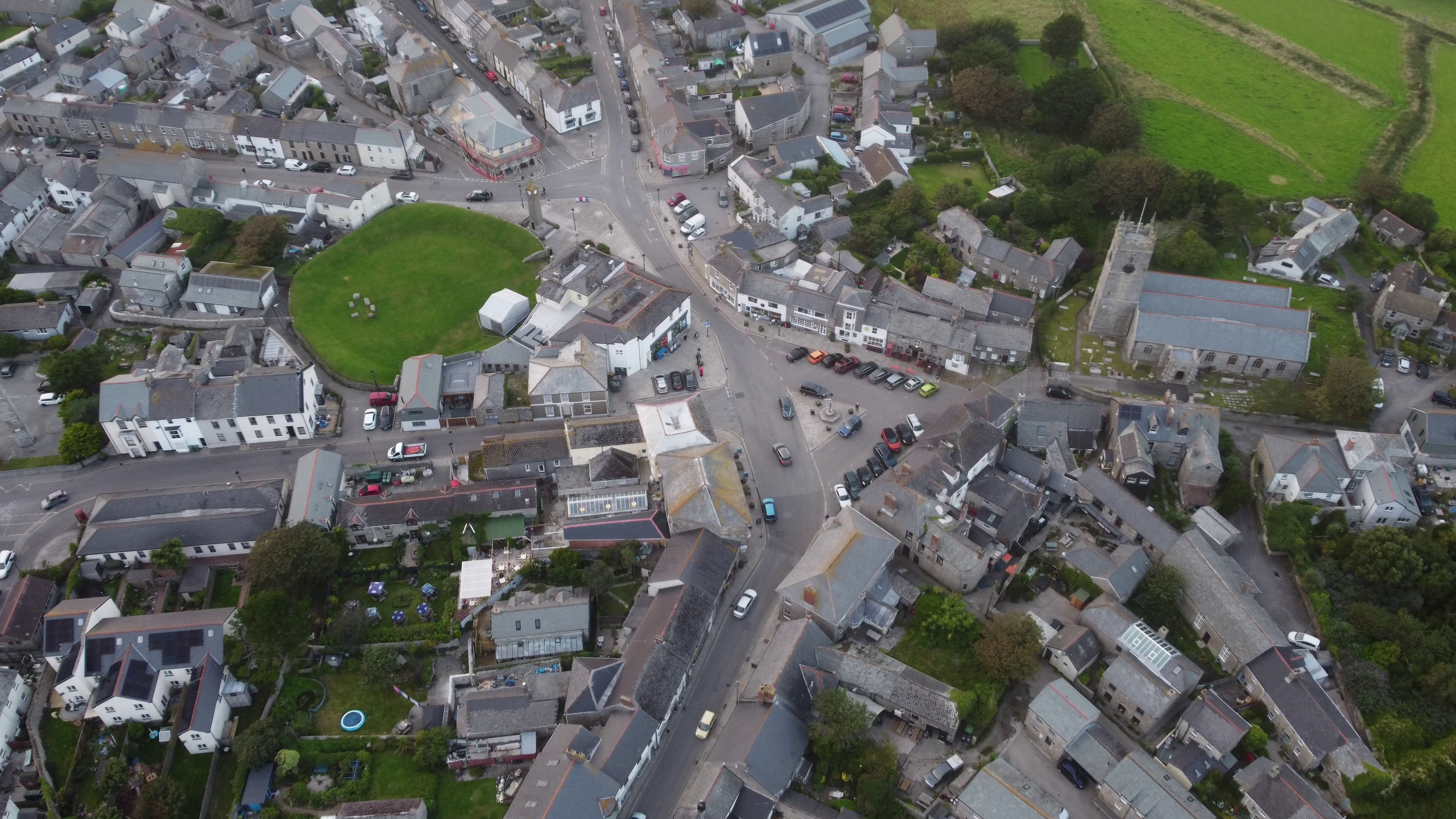
- Market Square from the air

- Location within Cornwall
- Interactive map of St Just
- Population: 4,695 (Parish, 2021); 1,918 (Built up area, 2021)
- OS grid reference: SW371315
- Civil parish: St Just (town council is called "St Just-in-Penwith Town Council")
- Unitary authority: Cornwall
- Ceremonial county: Cornwall
- Region: South West
- Country: England
- Sovereign state: United Kingdom
- Post town: PENZANCE
- Postcode district: TR19
- Dialling code: 01736
- Police: Devon and Cornwall
- Fire: Cornwall
- Ambulance: South Western
- UK Parliament: St Ives

St Just (Cornish: Lannust [ˈlanːʏst]), also known as St Just in Penwith, is a town and civil parish in Cornwall, England, United Kingdom. It lies along the B3306 road which connects St Ives to the A30 road. The parish encompasses the town of St Just and the nearby settlements of Trewellard, Pendeen and Kelynack: it is bounded by the parishes of Morvah to the north-east, Sancreed and Madron to the east, St Buryan and Sennen to the south and by the sea in the west. The parish consists of 7,622 acres (3,085 ha) of land, 12 acres (4.9 ha) of water and 117 acres (47.3 ha) of foreshore. The town of St Just is the most westerly town in mainland Britain and is situated approximately 8 miles (13 km) west of Penzance along the A3071. At the 2021 census the population of the parish was 4,695 and the population of the built up area was 1,918.

St Just lies within the Cornwall National Landscape (AONB). St Just is one of only two towns included within the Cornwall National Landscape.

== History ==
The identity of Saint Just is not known. Cornwall's long resistance to the edicts of Canterbury and Rome makes it most unlikely that the saint was Archbishop Justus of Canterbury, as some sources claim. Another possibility is the 6th- or 7th-century Saint Iestyn, who is said to have been the son of Geraint ab Erbin, a ruler of Dumnonia. In 1478 William of Worcester found that the church was believed to contain the bones of Justus of Trieste.

Among the prehistoric antiquities nearby is Ballowall Barrow, a chambered tomb. St Just is one of the most ancient mining districts in Cornwall, and remains of ancient pre-industrial and more modern mining activity have had a considerable impact on the nearby landscape.

Bosworlas, in St Just parish, was said by Henry Jenner to have been named as 'the Dwelling of Gorlois' after Gorlois, the legendary duke of Cornwall, who he believed was a real fifth or sixth century figure, either a petty chief and vassal of the Royal House of Dumnonia, or of the line of the original chiefs of the Dumnonii if the kings of Dumnonia were the leaders of the Britons displaced by the Saxons. He notes its closeness to Bosigran 'the Dwelling of Igerna', Gorlois's wife in Arthurian legend.

=== Churches and schools ===
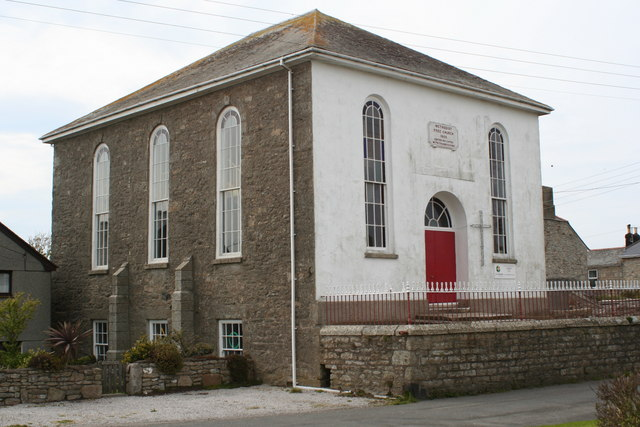
St Just Methodist Free Church

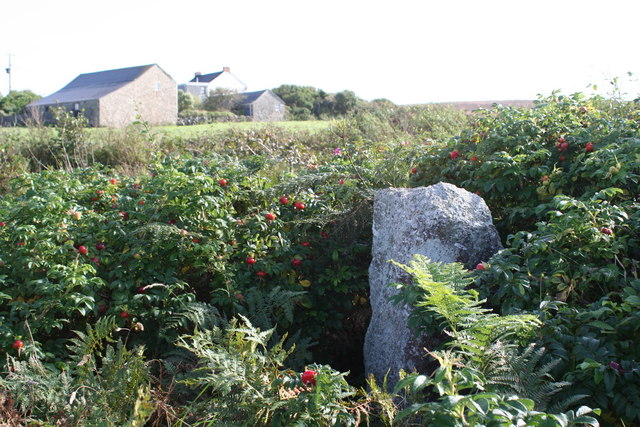
The cross at Leswidden

The parish church of St Just is a fine 15th-century building. In 1336 the church was rebuilt and dedicated by John Grandisson, Bishop of Exeter; however only the chancel of this church survives and the nave and aisles are 15th-century in date. There are two Methodist chapels.

St Just is the home of Cape Cornwall School which also serves Sennen, Sancreed, Pendeen, St Buryan and other places in the district.

There are eight Cornish crosses in the parish, including two in the vicarage garden and one built into the church wall. Other crosses are at Leswidden, Nanquidno, Kenidjack (two) and Cot Valley. Boslow Cross is 550 yds (500 m) NW of Boslow Farm (ref. no. 1003110).

=== Mining ===
The ancient settlement has a strong mining history and was during the 19th century one of the most important mining districts in Cornwall both for copper and for tin. Mines within the area included Boscaswell Downs, Balleswidden, Parknoweth, Boscean, Wheal Owles, Wheal Boys, Levant, Botallack and Geevor (which closed in 1990). Geevor mine is now a tourist attraction which allows visitors to explore Cornish mining heritage. The boom in 19th-century mining saw a dramatic increase in the population of St Just, the 1861 census records the population figure as being 9,290; however, like other areas in Cornwall the population declined with the collapse in the tin trade in the 19th century. The town also suffered from the decision of the Great Western Railway to abandon its plans to make St Just the terminus of the London mainline to Cornwall. It was announced in July 2006 that the St Just mining district and the rest of the historic mining areas of Cornwall had become the Cornwall and West Devon Mining Landscape World Heritage Site.

== Geography ==
The stream in the nearby Cot Valley meets the Atlantic at Porth Nanven, sometimes called Penanwell. The area has been heavily mined, as was the area around St Just. The rounded boulders in the cliff are of specific scientific interest. Also nearby is Cape Cornwall.

=== Climate ===
Climate data for St Just in Penwith
Month	Jan	Feb	Mar	Apr	May	Jun	Jul	Aug	Sep	Oct	Nov	Dec	Year
Mean daily maximum °C (°F)	9.9 (49.8)	9.4 (48.9)	10.6 (51.1)	12.3 (54.1)	14.8 (58.6)	17.6 (63.7)	19.5 (67.1)	19.5 (67.1)	17.8 (64.0)	15.2 (59.4)	12.2 (54.0)	10.8 (51.4)	14.1 (57.4)
Mean daily minimum °C (°F)	5.4 (41.7)	5.0 (41.0)	5.7 (42.3)	6.7 (44.1)	9.1 (48.4)	11.7 (53.1)	13.6 (56.5)	13.7 (56.7)	12.4 (54.3)	10.6 (51.1)	7.7 (45.9)	6.4 (43.5)	9.0 (48.2)
Average precipitation mm (inches)	141 (5.6)	109 (4.3)	105 (4.1)	68 (2.7)	69 (2.7)	66 (2.6)	62 (2.4)	78 (3.1)	89 (3.5)	119 (4.7)	135 (5.3)	142 (5.6)	1,227.1 (48.31)
Average precipitation days (≥ 1.0 mm)	22	18	19	16	15	13	13	15	16	19	21	22	209
Mean monthly sunshine hours	61.6	82.8	131.9	187.2	219.8	212.7	219.8	205.2	164.5	114.3	79.4	55.7	1,735

== Governance ==
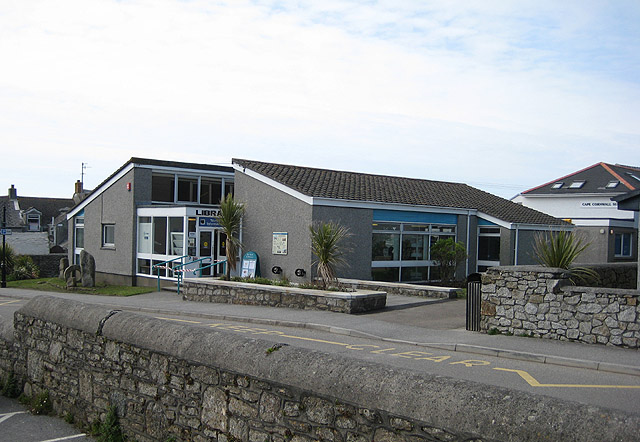
Library and town council offices, Market Street

There are two tiers of local government covering St Just, at parish (town) and unitary authority level: St Just-in-Penwith Town Council and Cornwall Council. The town council is based on Market Street, in the same building as the town's library.

=== Administrative history ===
St Just was an ancient parish in the Penwith Hundred of Cornwall. In 1837 the parish became part of the Penzance poor law union, a group of parishes which collectively administered their responsibilities under the poor laws. When elected parish and district councils were established under the Local Government Act 1894, St Just was given a parish council and included in the West Penwith Rural District, which covered the parts of the Penzance poor law union that did not have urban authorities.

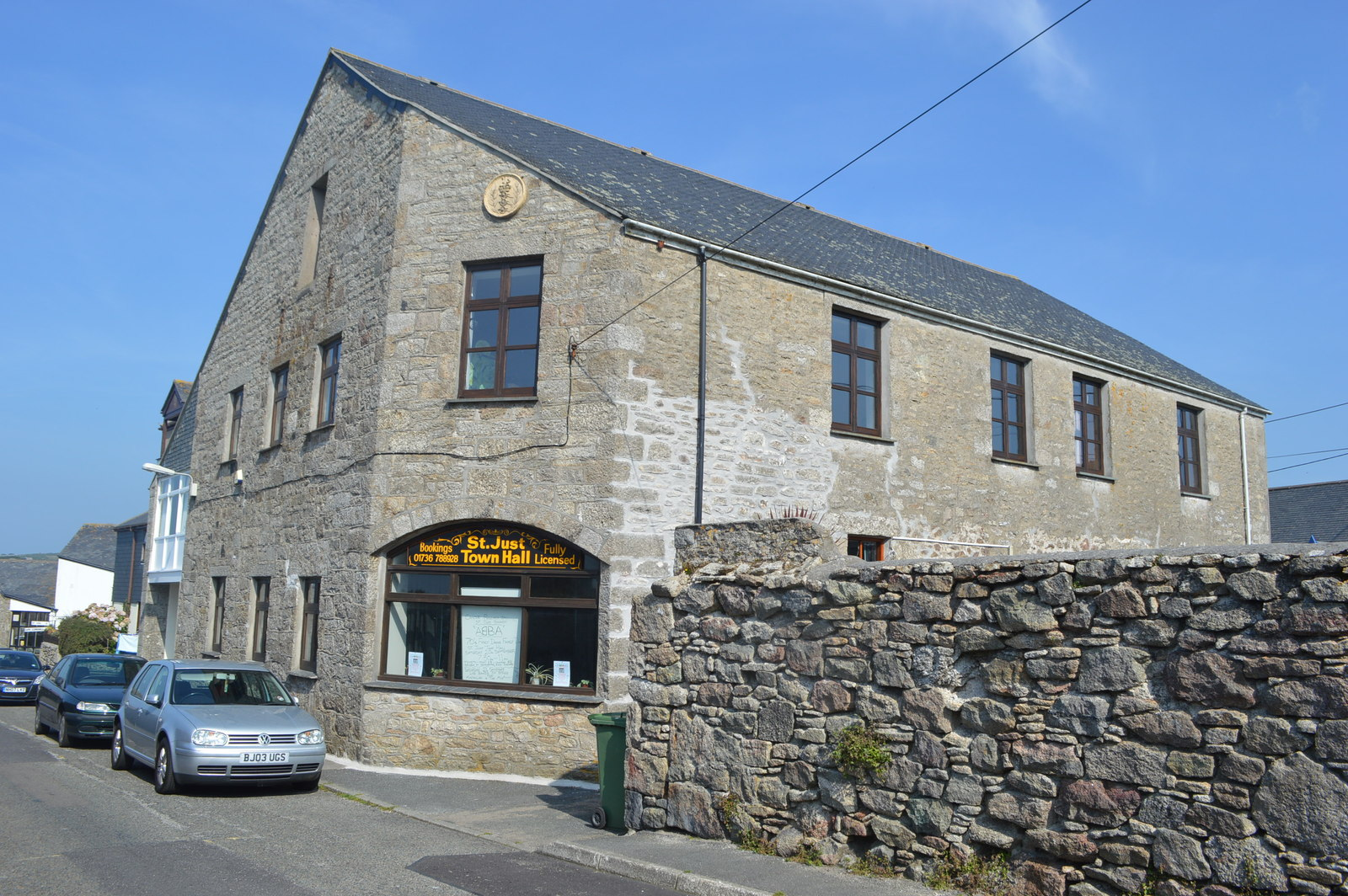
The Old Town Hall, Chapel Road

In 1897 the parish was raised to the status of an urban district. It was therefore removed from the West Penwith Rural District. An urban district council replaced the parish council and took over district-level functions. In 1939 the council acquired the former drill hall on Chapel Road and converted it into their Town Hall, serving as the council's offices and meeting place, with the main hall being used for public entertainments.

St Just Urban District was abolished in 1974 under the Local Government Act 1972, when the area became part of the Penwith district. A successor parish called St Just was created at the same time, covering the area of the abolished urban district. As part of the 1974 reforms, parish councils were given the right to declare their parishes to be a town, allowing them to take the title of town council and giving the title of mayor to the council's chairperson. The new parish council for St Just exercised this right. The parish's legal name is simply "St Just", but the town council styles itself "St Just-in-Penwith Town Council". The "in Penwith" suffix has long been used informally to distinguish this St Just from St Just in Roseland.

Penwith district was abolished in 2009. Cornwall County Council then took on district-level functions, making it a unitary authority, and was renamed Cornwall Council.

== Culture and local traditions ==
St Just is home to the popular Lafrowda festival a seven-day community and arts celebration usually held in mid July.

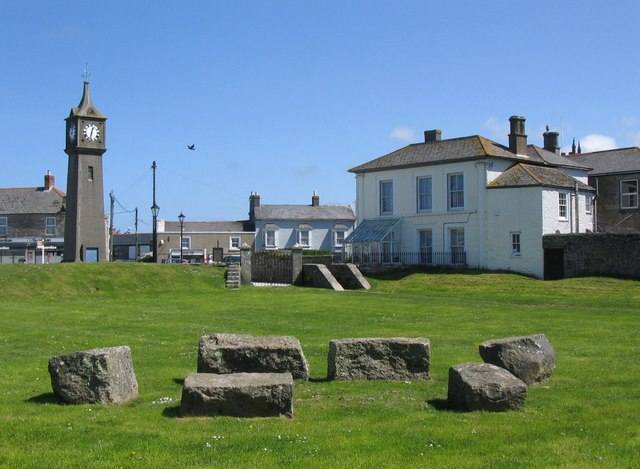
Plen an Gwarry, common green near the clock tower in the centre of St Just

A more ancient celebration associated with the town is St Just Feast which is held every year to celebrate the dedication of the parish church on 13 July 1336. Feast celebrations were moved to the Sunday nearest to All Saints' Day in 1536 following an Act of Henry VIII which means it usually take place at the end of October / beginning of November. Feast itself is a two-day event with a church service and civic procession being held on Feast Sunday and a larger scale popular celebration being held on Feast Monday (which includes a meeting of the Western Hunt). A description of St Just Feast, from 1882, follows:

"Rich and poor still at this season keep open house, and all the young people from St. Just who are in service for many miles around, if they can possibly be spared, go home on the Saturday and stay until the Tuesday morning. A small fair is held in the streets on Monday evening, when the young men are expected to treat their sweethearts liberally, and a great deal of "foolish money" that can be ill afforded is often spent"

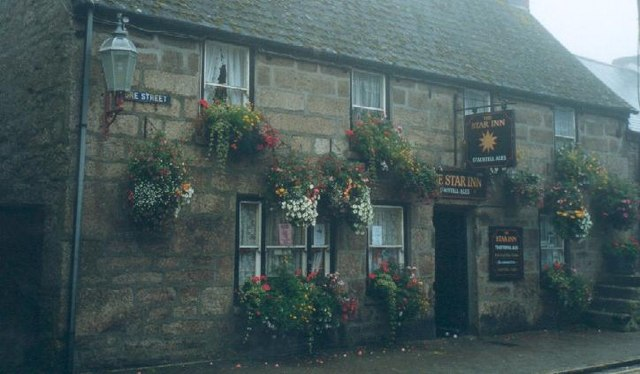
The Star Inn

St Just also has a 'Plen an Gwarry' (Cornish for "playing place"), locally pronounced 'Plain an Gwarry'. These sites were used historically for Cornish wrestling, open-air performance, entertainment and instruction. St Just's Plen an Gwarry occasionally hosts productions of the Cornish Ordinalia mystery plays.

St Just has a healthy artistic scene, including the painter Kurt Jackson who has made several television appearances. Contemporary singer and comedian Jethro from nearby St Buryan played for St Just Rugby Club and has recorded a song entitled "St Just".

The folk singer Martha Tilston released an album in 2010 called Lucy and the Wolves. This features a range of songs inspired by Cornwall. The first song on the album is called The Cape and is based upon Cape Cornwall in St Just. She has performed in Penzance a number of times and now lives in Penwith.

The children's animated television series Jungle Junction is produced by Spider Eye Productions of St. Just.

The local community radio station is Coast FM (formerly Penwith Radio), which broadcasts on 96.5 and 97.2 FM.

The Star Inn is sometimes called the last proper pub in Cornwall. Its clientele includes bird watchers who are attracted by the local wildlife.

=== Cornish wrestling ===
The St Just Plen an Gwari was specifically used for Cornish wrestling tournaments both traditionally and more recently.

James Warren (1786-?) from St Just was a very famous Cornish wrestler, who became champion of Cornwall. He fought in tournaments throughout Britain, including London. He was known as 'Little Jem Warren' or 'Little Hercules' due to being 5 feet 7.5 inches high or 'Great Jem' from having prodigious strength. He distinguished himself in the rescue of survivors when the East Indiaman ship, "Kent" caught fire.

Thomas White from St Just was the original trainer of Jack Carkeek, in the US, who became world Cornish wrestling champion.

== Sport and Leisure ==
=== Cricket ===
St Just Cricket Club is an English amateur cricket club with a history of cricket in the village dating back to 1880. Only 5 miles (8 km) from Land's End, St Just claim to be the most westerly ECB Premier League club in the country. Most notable is the club's significant success record, with 10 championship titles won in the Cornwall Cricket League since 1990.

St Just field three senior teams in the Cornwall Cricket League and a women's team in the Cornwall Women and Girls League. They also have an established junior training section that plays competitive cricket in the Cornwall Youth Cricket League.

=== Rugby ===
St Just Rugby Football Club was established in 1967 and their ground is based north east of St Just, on the New Road leading out of the hamlet of Tregeseal. The club competes in the Counties 2 Tribute, South West Division.

=== Football ===
St Just Football Club was established in 1894. The club fields two senior teams in the Cornwall Combination League and a Youth section.

== Bus services ==
St Just bus station is served by routes 7, 8, A3 and A17. Services 7 and 8 are provided by Transport for Cornwall. A3 is provided by First Kernow and the two providers jointly run the A17 service.

7: Penzance to Lands End via St Just 8: Long Rock(Morrison’s) to St Just via Sancreed A3: St Ives to Lands End via St Just (Atlantic Coaster) A17: St Ives to Pendeen via Penzance and St Just

== Twinning ==
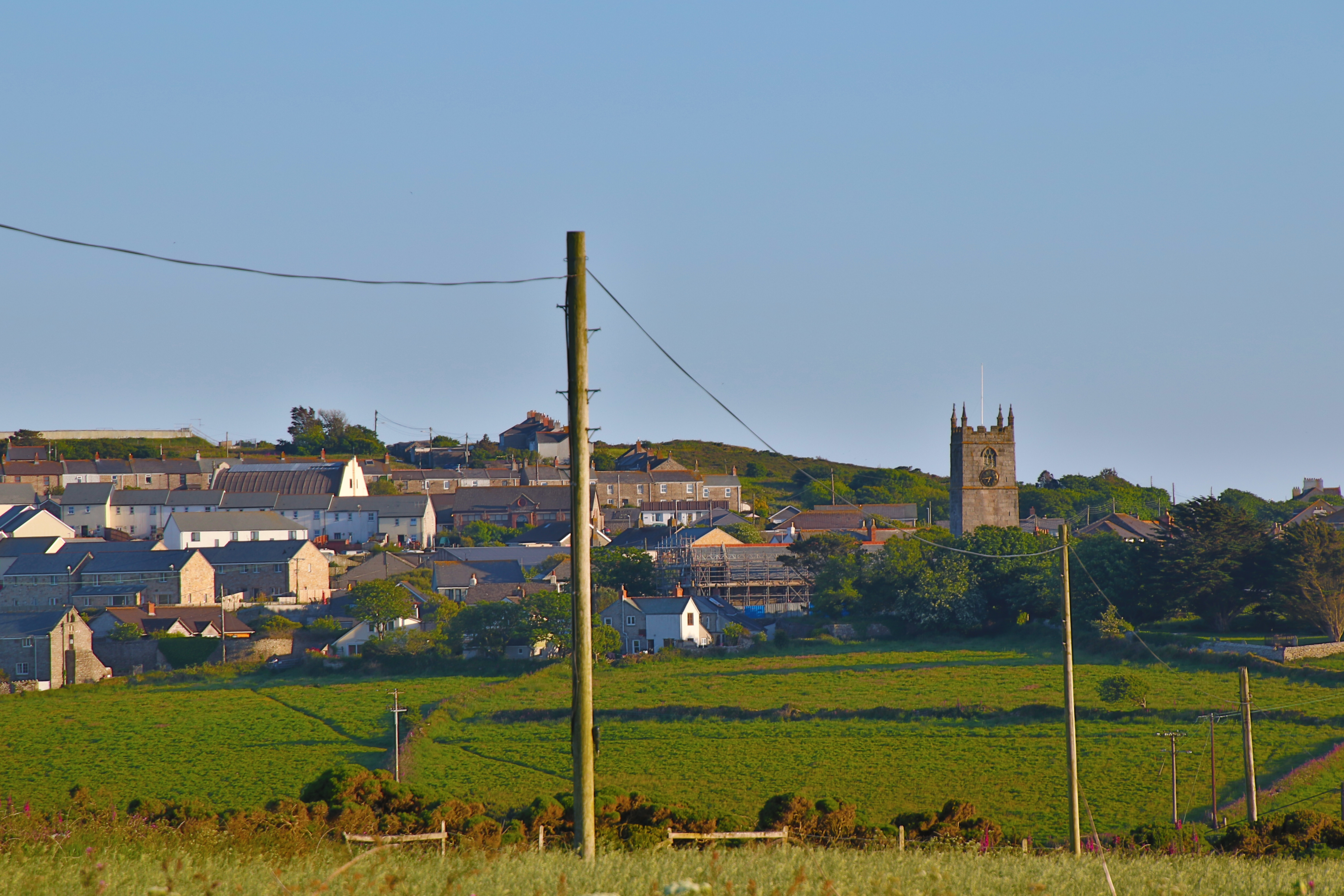
St Just Cornwall

St Just is twinned with Huelgoat, Bro-Gernev, Brittany. The town is also twinned, in partnership with Penzance, with Bendigo in the State of Victoria, Australia and with Nevada City in California, USA as a result of the historical links through the many people from the area who emigrated to the two destinations, mostly in the late 19th century, to find a better life in the mines there. There is still an area of Bendigo known as St. Just Point.

== Notable residents ==
- William Borlase (1696–1772), Cornish antiquary, geologist and naturalist from Pendeen.
- Francis Oats (1848–1918), Cornish miner who became chairman of the De Beers diamond company, founded by Cecil Rhodes
- Edward Charles Grenfell (1870–1941), banker and politician. was raised to the peerage in 1935 as Baron St Just, of St Just in Penwith in the County of Cornwall.
- Richard John Maddern-Williams (1885–1955), was a music teacher and organist, made a bard of the Cornish Gorseth for services to music in Cornwall.
- Lt Col J. H. Williams (1897–1958), soldier and elephant trainer, known as Elephant Bill.

== Gallery ==
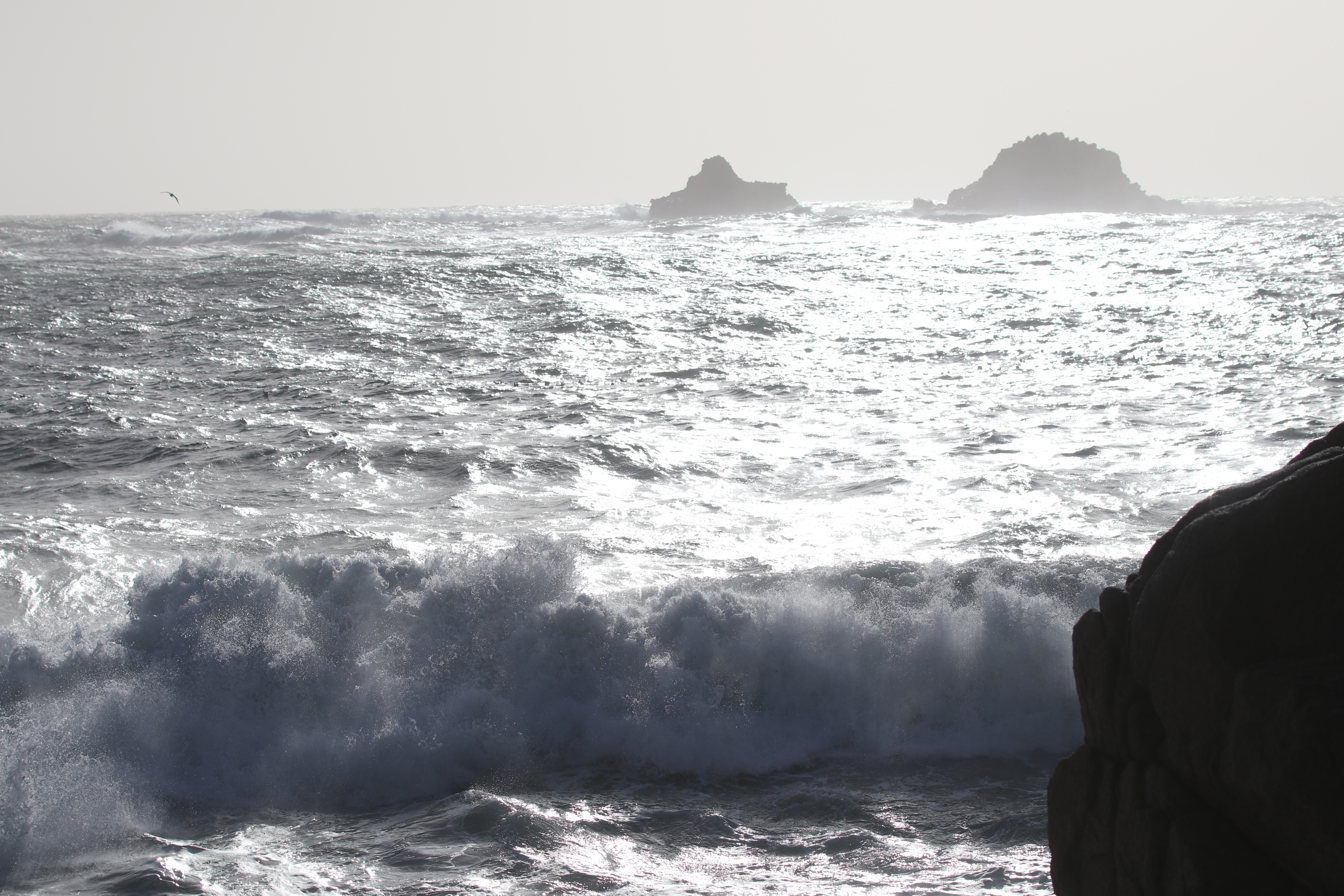
The Brisons in storm, St Just

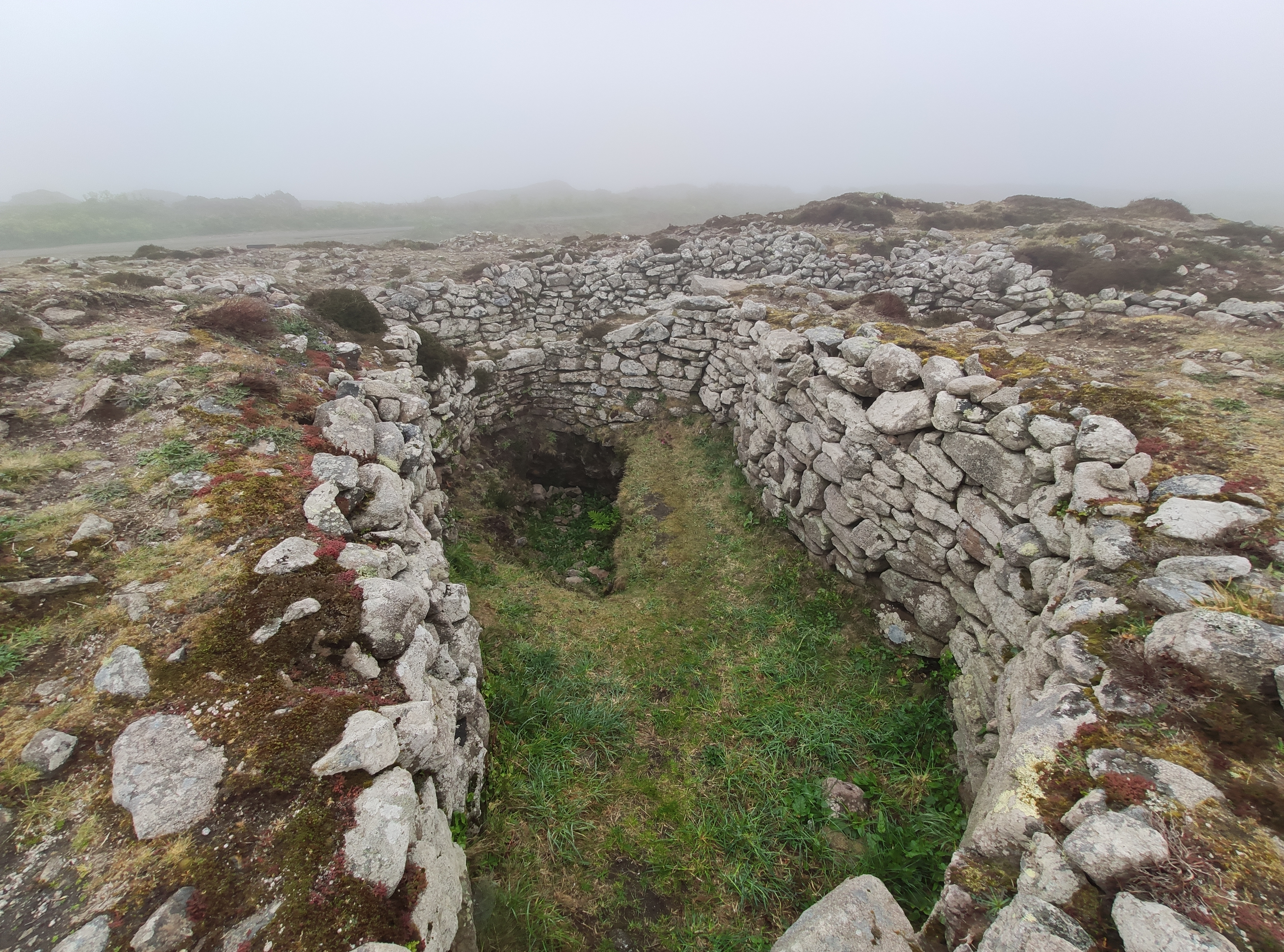
Bollowal Barrow, St Just

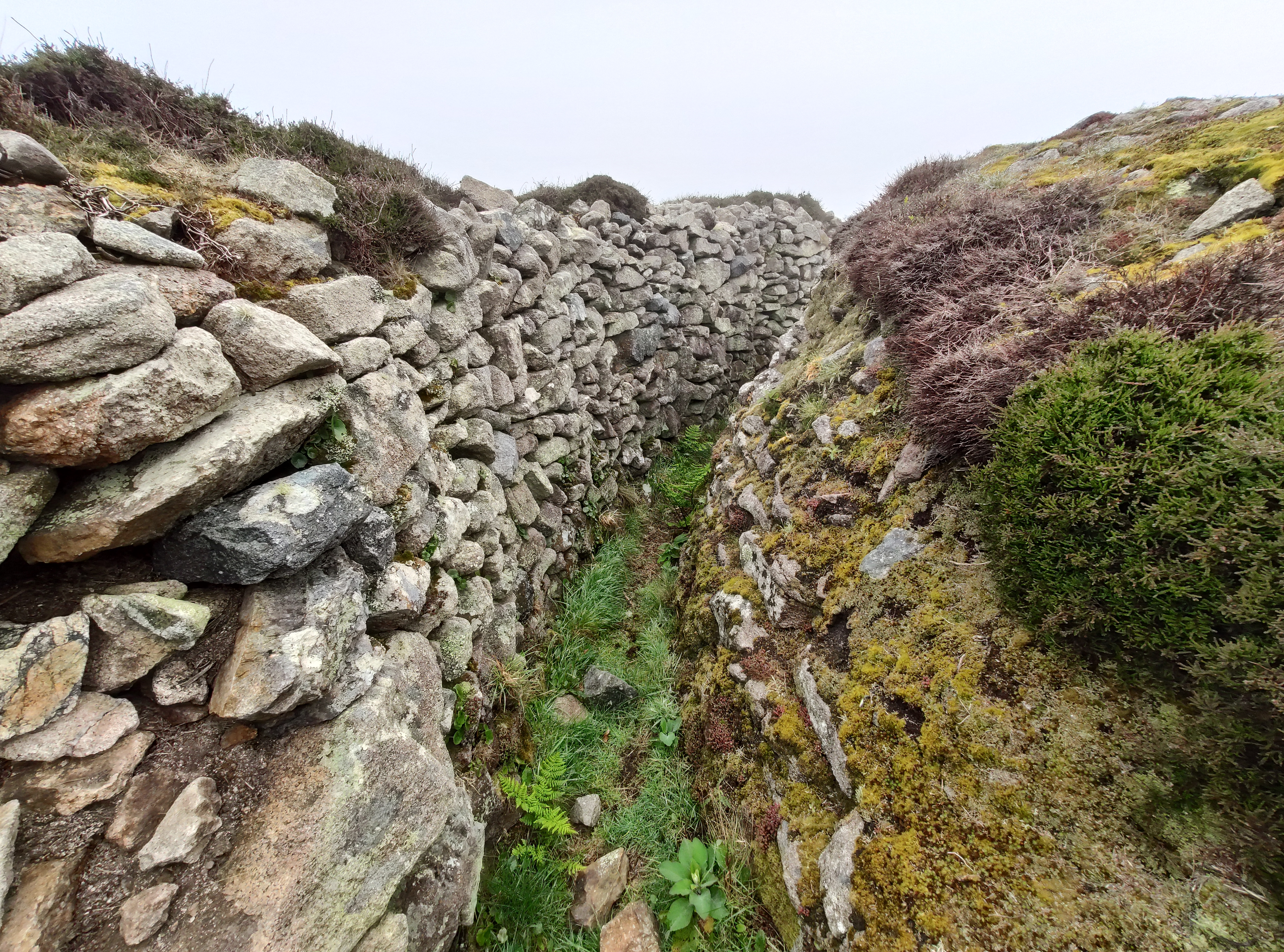
Rocks Bollowal Barrow, St Just

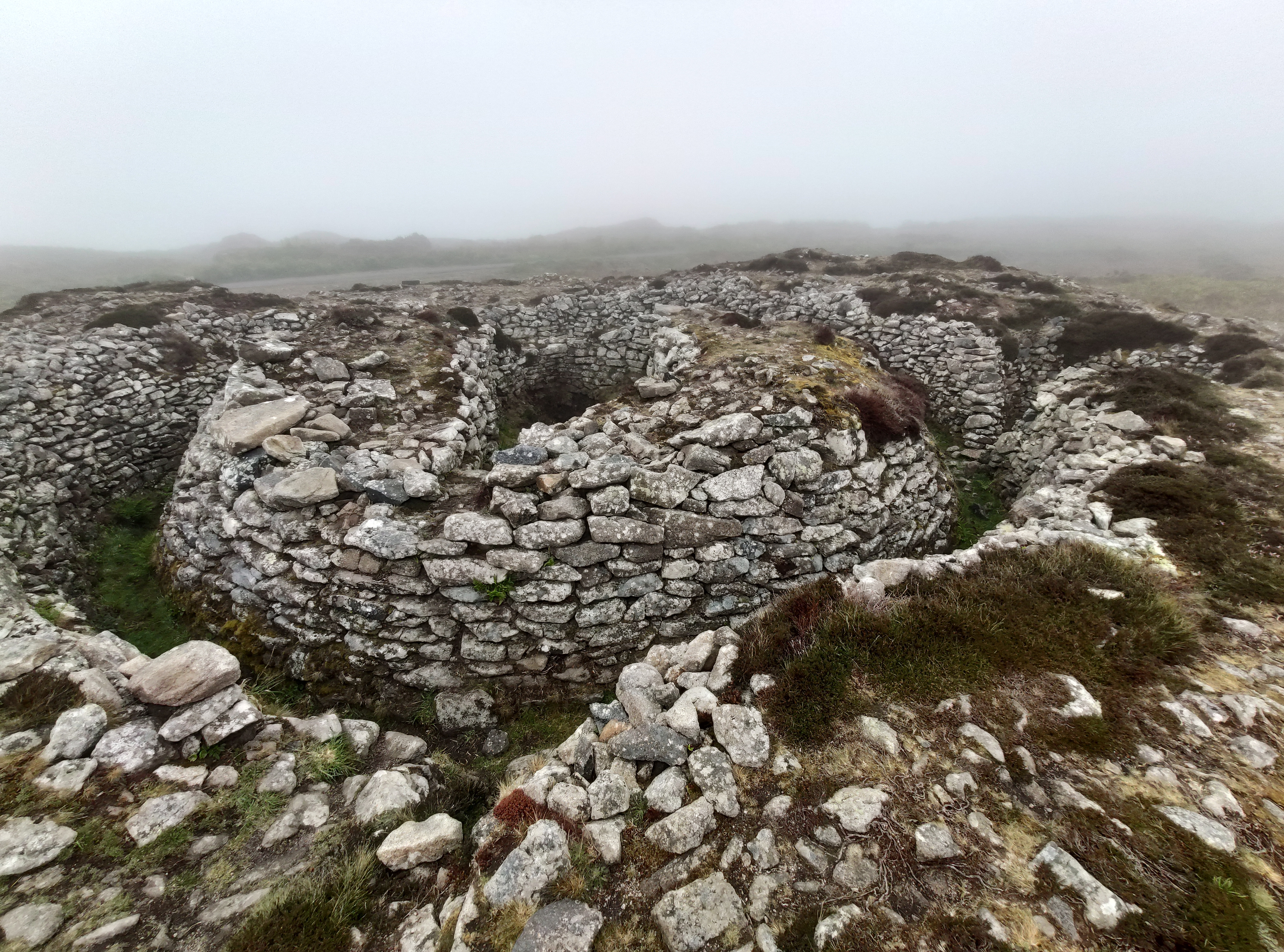
Beautiful Formation Bollowal Barrow, St Just

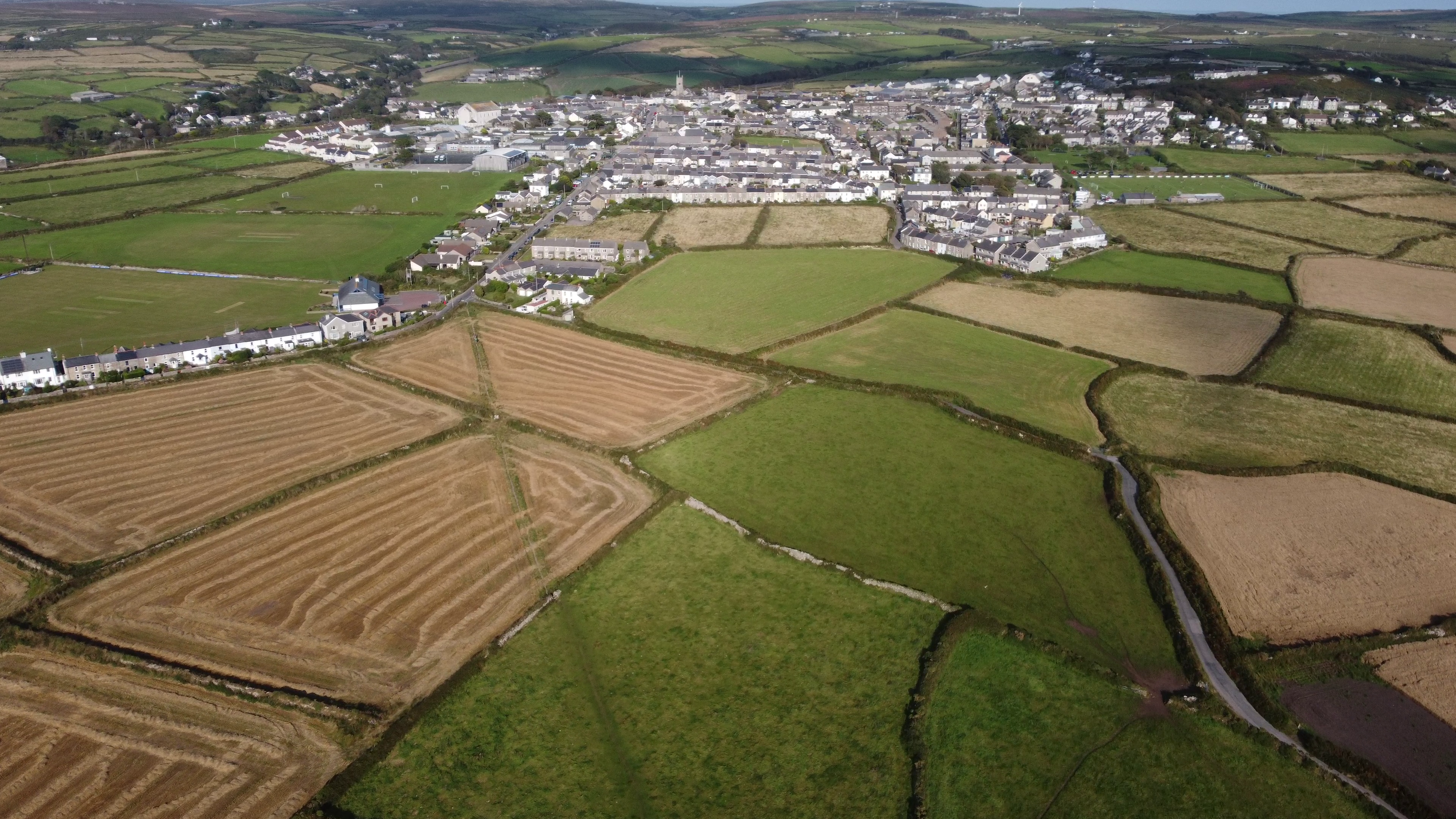
St Just from the air

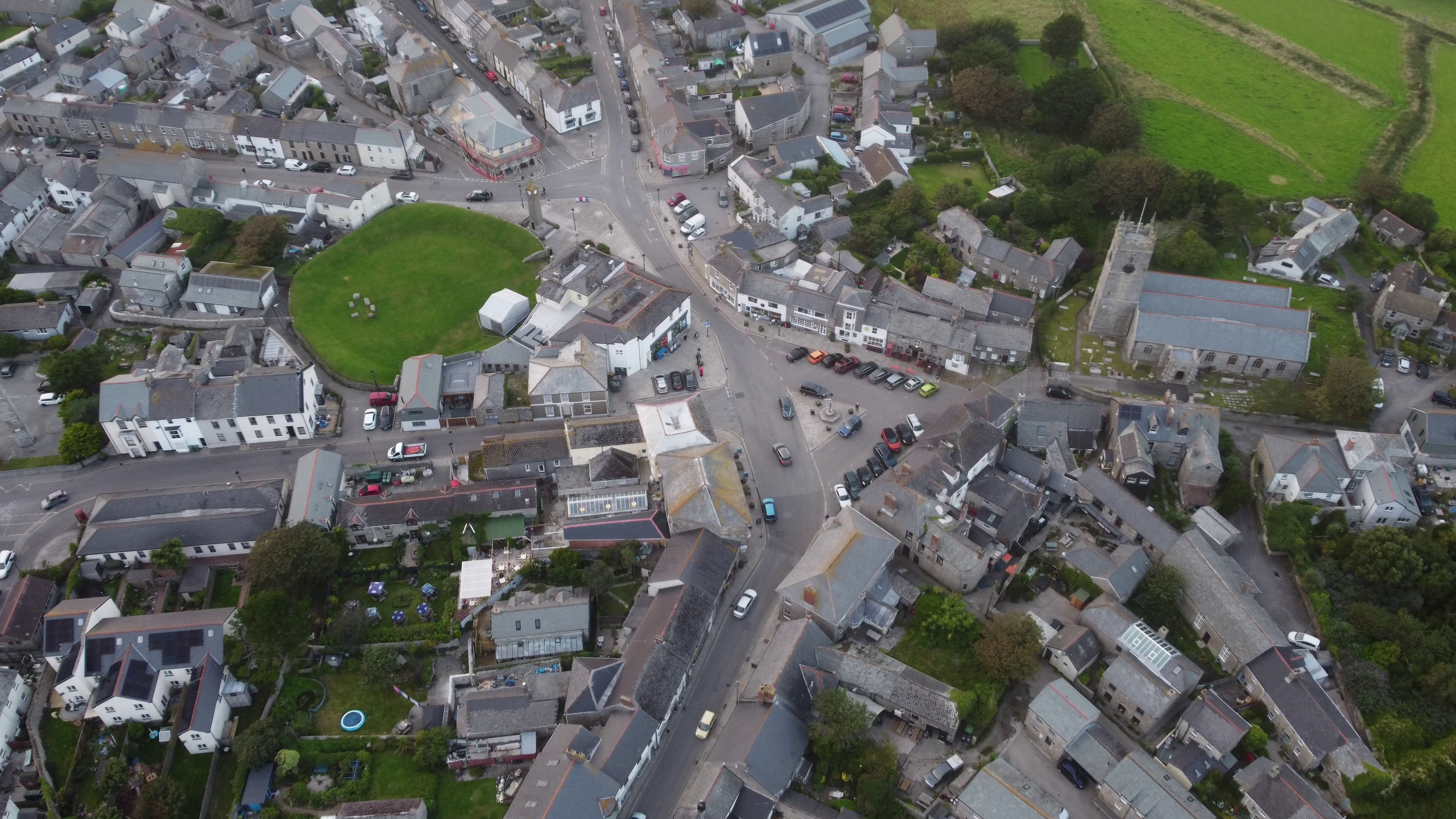
St Just from the air showing the Plein An Gwarry

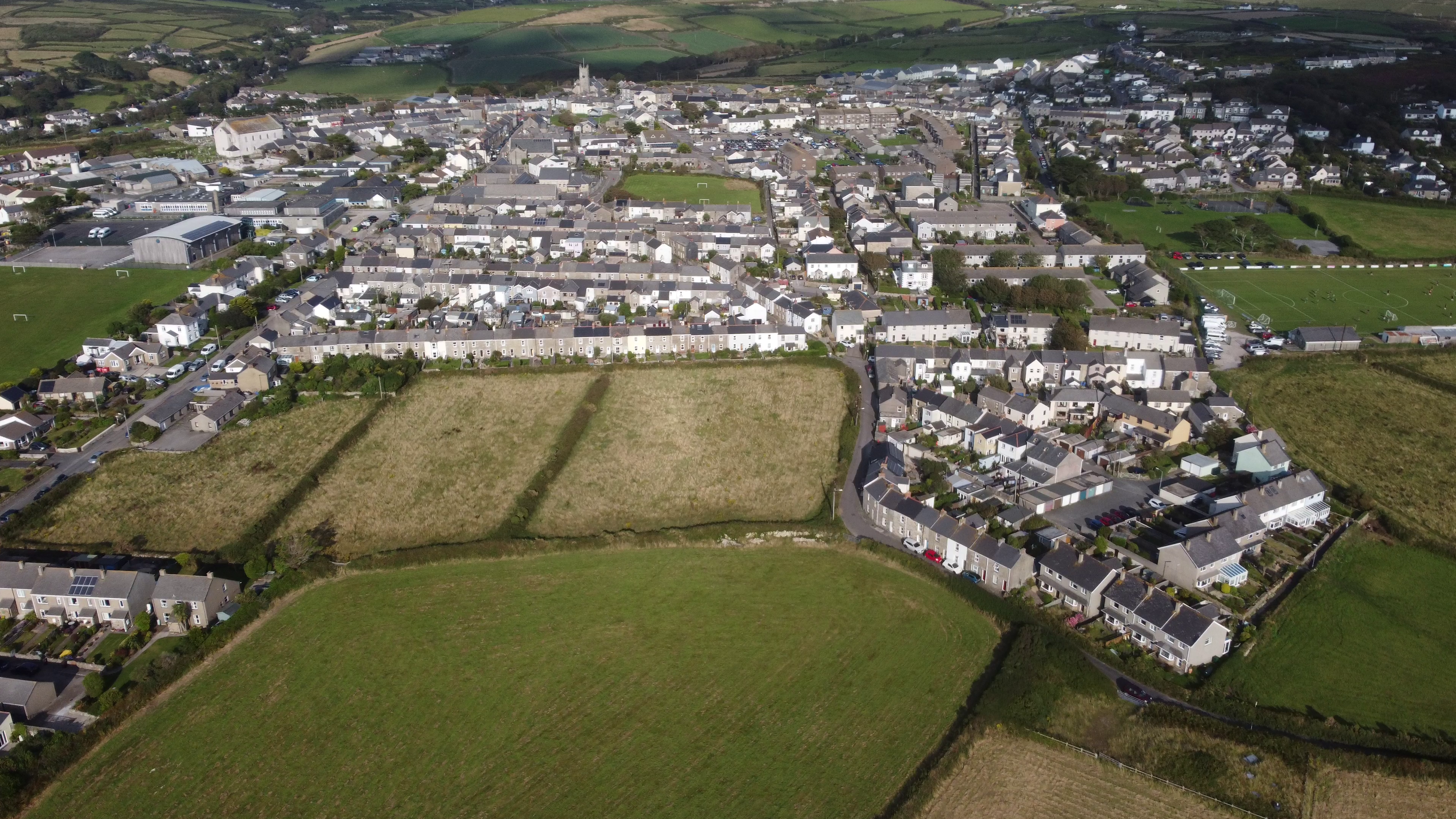
St Just looking towards the East

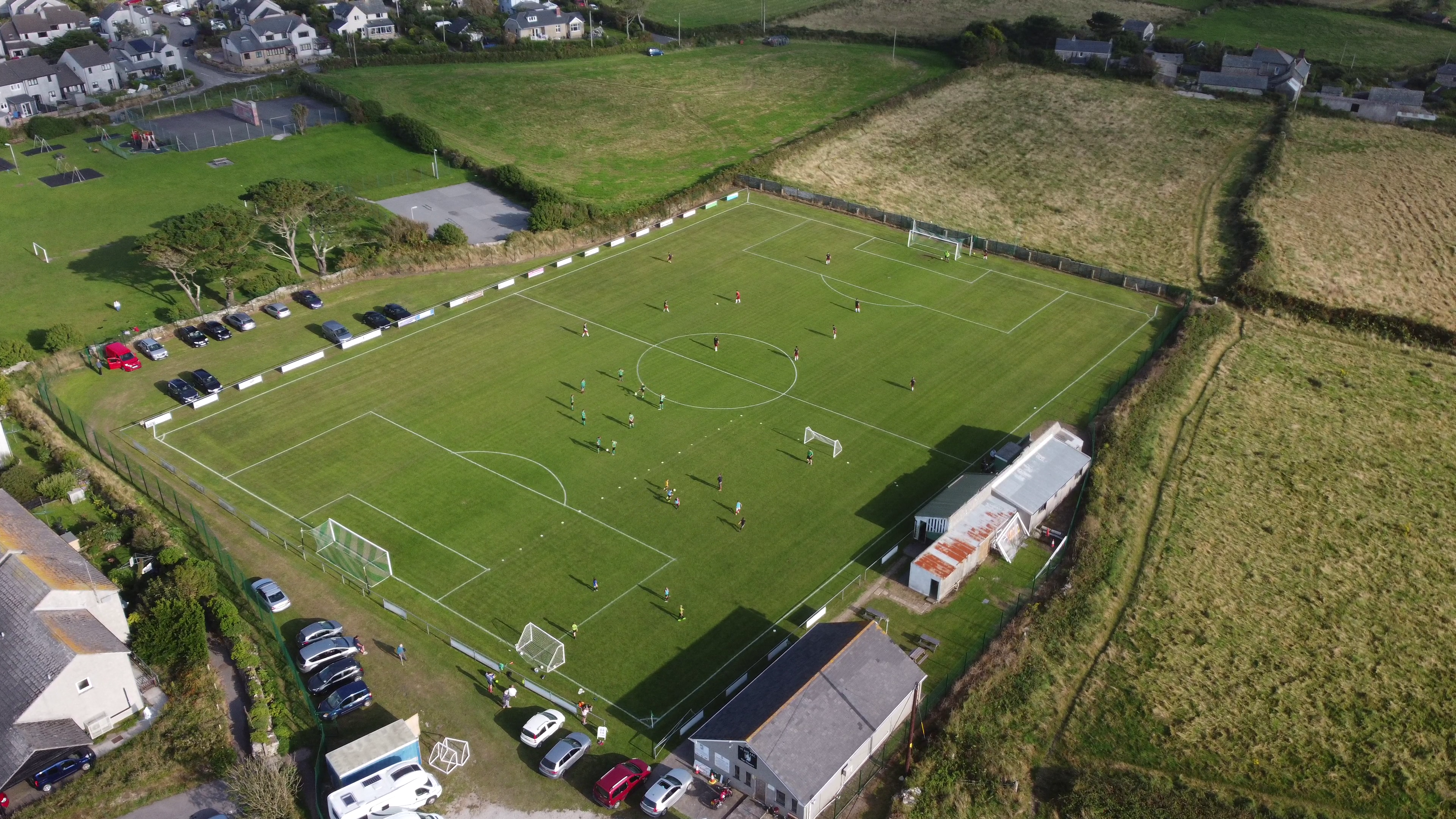
St Just Football Club from the air

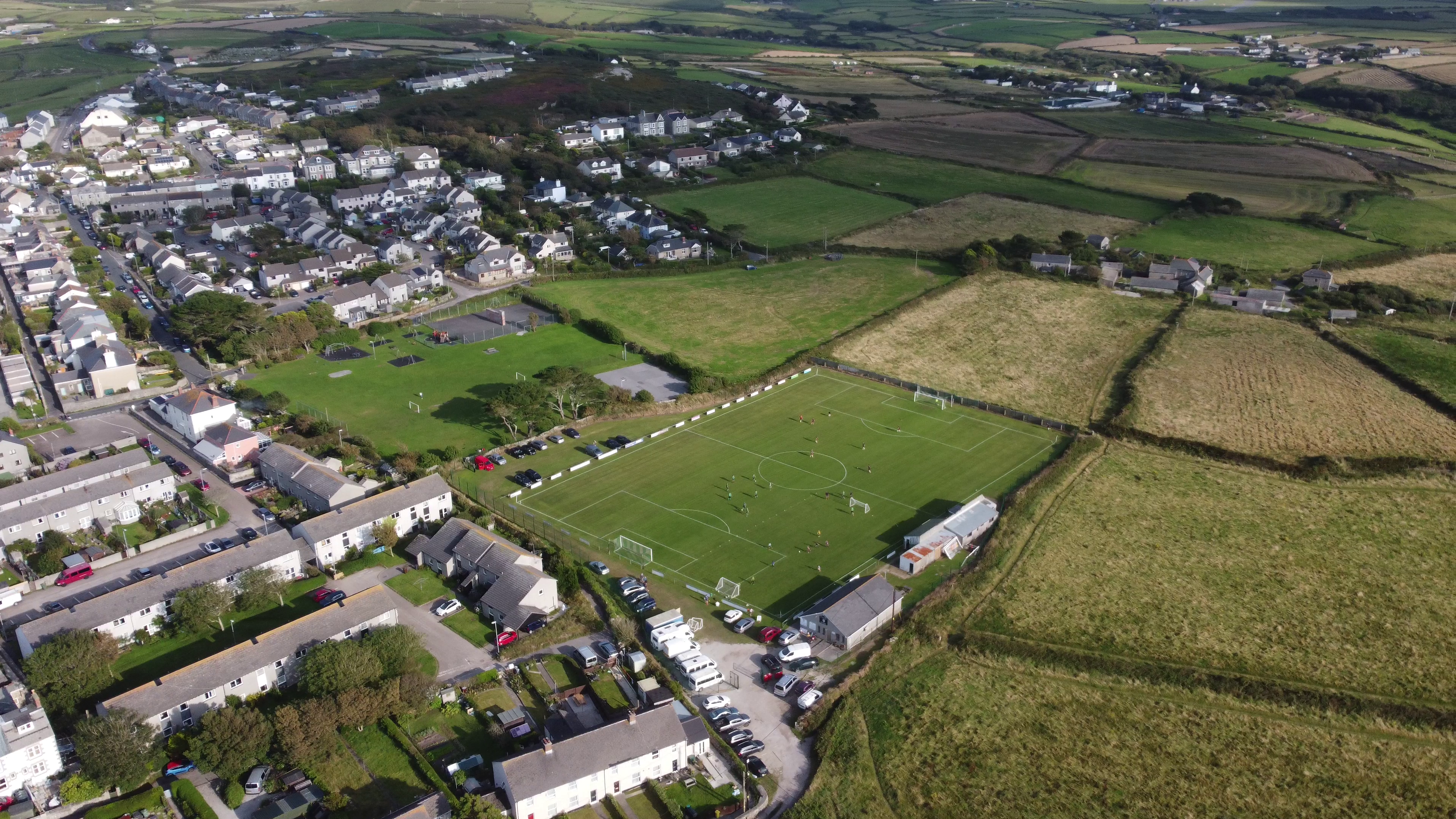
St Just from the air
