= Lafrowda Day =

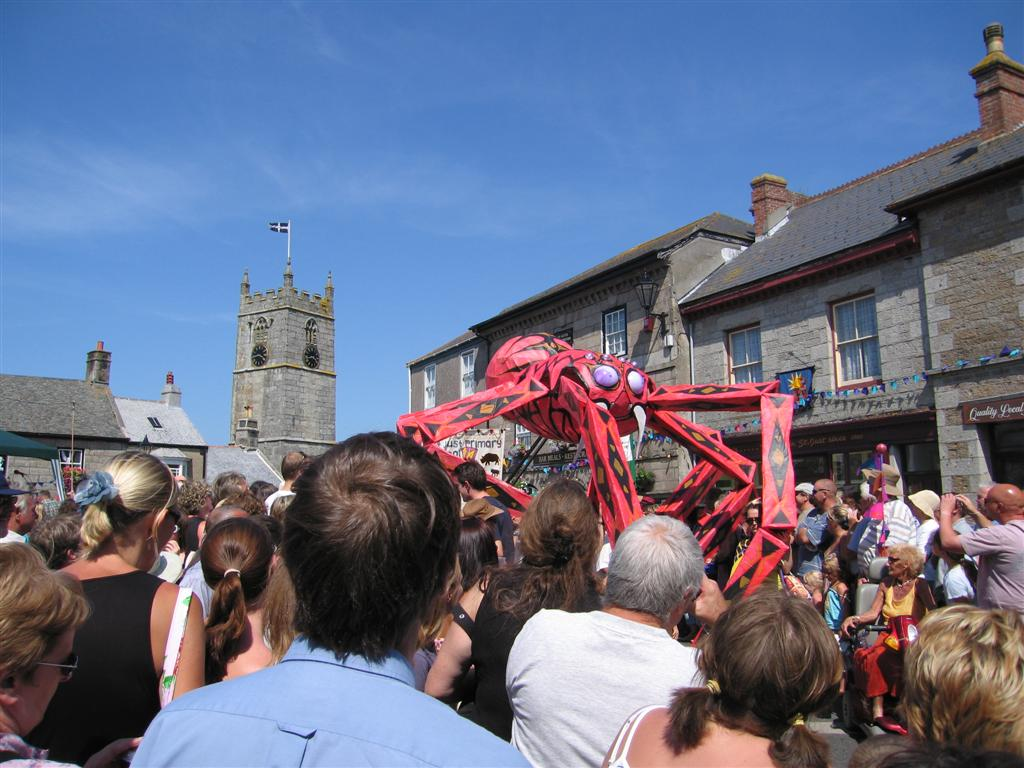
St Just's Lafrowda Day Festival

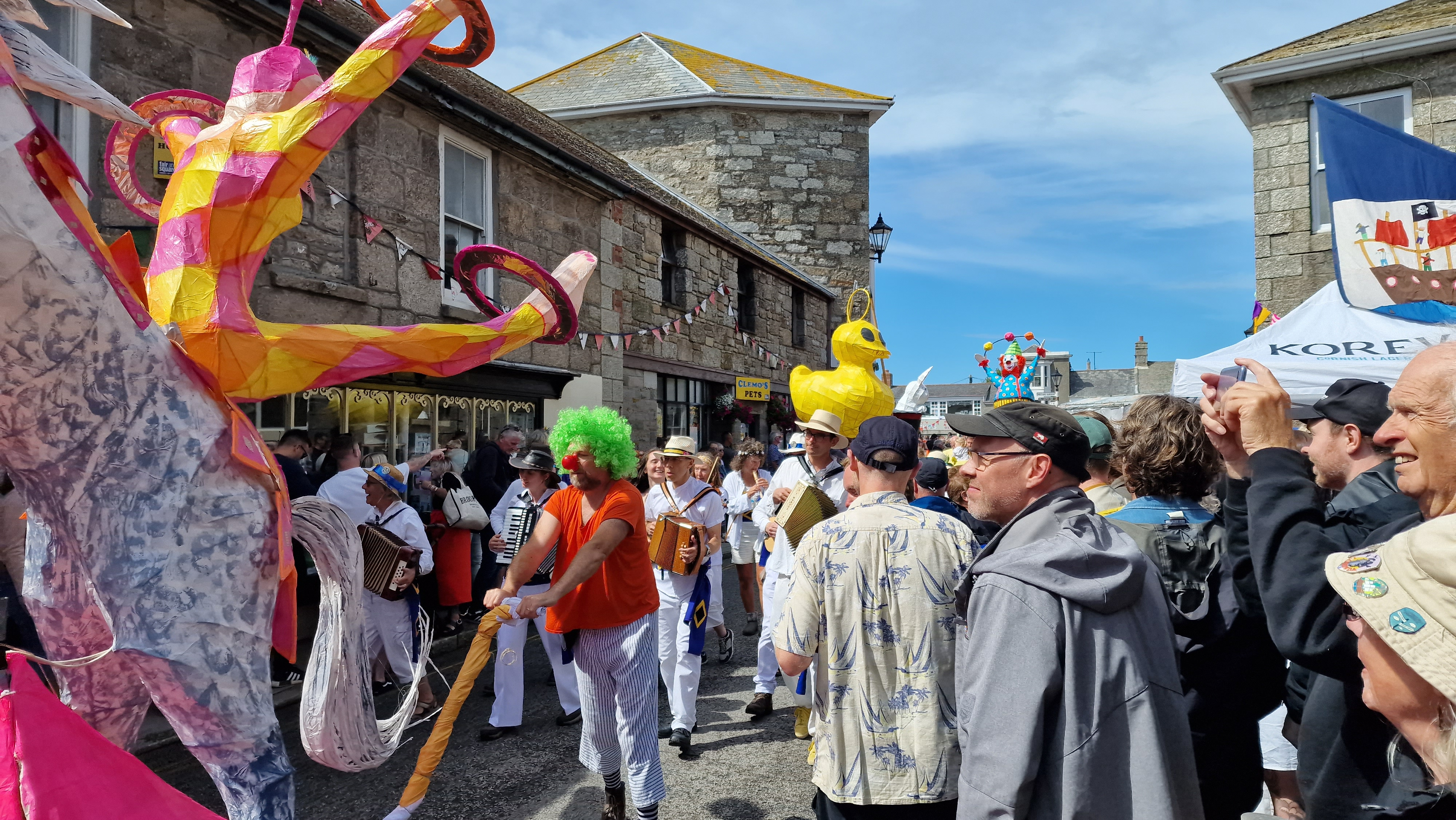
Lafrowda Day festival in St Just, Cornwall – the annual arts and music celebration in the town streets

Lafrowda Day is an annual festival of arts and music held on the third Saturday in July every year in the town of St Just in Penwith in Cornwall.
The Lafrowda Festival is a Registered Charity No: 1090446. Lafrowda is an ancient name for the St Just area and pronounced LaTHROWda. The 2016 Lafrowda Day Festival was the 20th year it has been held.
