= Treen (disambiguation) =

Treen is a small household object made of wood.

Treen may also refer to:

== People ==
- Dave Treen (1928–2009), American politician and attorney, governor of Louisiana
- Joyce Treen (fl. 2013–2017), Canadian politician
- Lorna Rose Treen (born 1994), English comedian and satirist
- Mary Treen (1907–1989), American actress
- Treen Morris (born 1944), Irish sailor

== Places ==
- Treen, St Levan, Cornwall, England, a village
- Treen, Zennor, Cornwall, England, a hamlet
  - Treen Cove, a tidal beach near the hamlet
- Treen, at one time an administrative unit in the Isle of Man
- Treen Cliff, a Site of Special Scientific Interest on the Penwith Peninsula in Cornwall, England
- Treen Peak, Washington state, United States

== Other uses ==
- Treens, fictional aliens from Venus in the Dan Dare British comic strips

== See also ==
- Treene (disambiguation)
- Lake Tréné, Chad
- Trien, another name for triethylenetetramine, an organic compound
- Triens, an ancient Roman bronze coin
- Triens, another name for the Frankish tremissis, a gold coin of late antiquity
