= Dwynwen =

Welsh patron saint of lovers

Saint Dwynwen
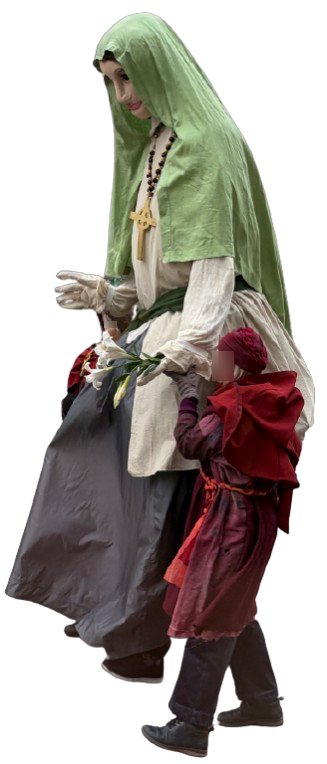
- A giant puppet of Dwynwen seen at the yearly Saint Dwynwen's parade in Aberystwyth, 2026
- Died: c. 460; Ynys Llanddwyn, Kingdom of Gwynedd
- Venerated in: Roman Catholic Church; Eastern Orthodox Church 7 February / 25 January.
- Major shrine: St Dwynwen's Church, Ynys Llanddwyn, Anglesey
- Feast: 25 January
- Patronage: Lovers in Wales; Sick animals

Saint Dwynwen (Welsh pronunciation: [ˈdʊɨnwɛn]; fl. 5th century), sometimes known as Dwyn or Donwen, is the Welsh patron saint of lovers. She is celebrated throughout Wales on 25 January.

== History and legend ==
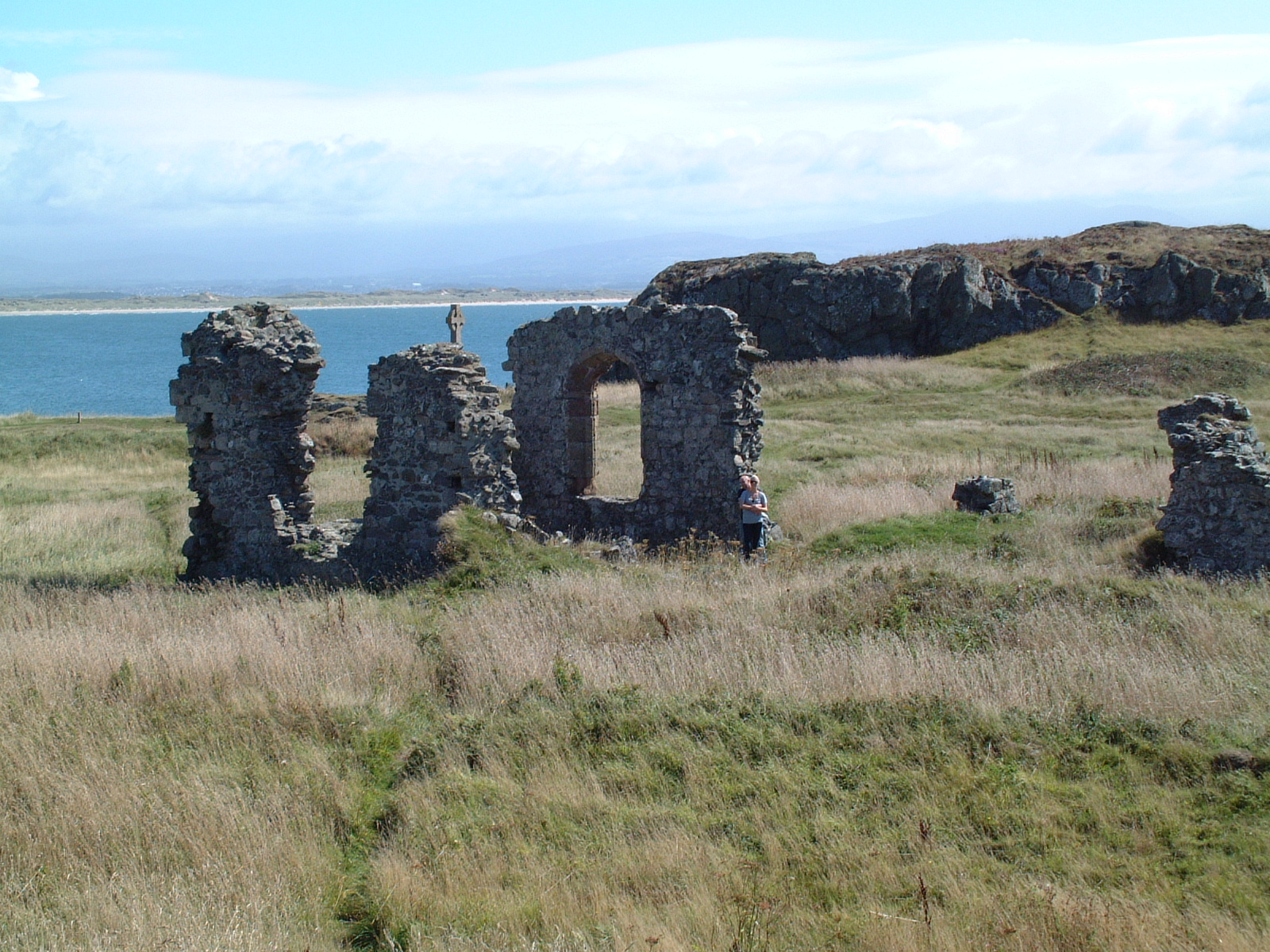
The ruins of St Dwynwen's Church on Ynys Llanddwyn

The original tale of Dwynwen has become mixed with elements of folklore and Celtic stories, resulting in multiple versions. She is believed to have been a daughter of King Brychan Brycheiniog, who lived in the 5th century; her mother may have been Rigrawst. Dwynwen is said to have resided in Anglesey.

In one well-known version of the legend, a young man named Maelon Dafodrill falls in love with Dwynwen, but she rejects him; in another, she cannot marry him because her father has already promised her to another. Distraught, Dwynwen prays to fall out of love with Maelon. An angel appears with a potion: Maelon turns to ice. God then grants her three requests: that Maelon be released from his icy fate; that God, through Dwynwen, watch over all true lovers; and that she herself remain unmarried. As a mark of thanks, she retreats to the solitude of Ynys Llanddwyn off Anglesey, becoming a hermit until her death around AD 460 (some texts say she fled there out of fear of Maelgwn Gwynedd).

Tradition also credits Dwynwen with studying the healing properties of local herbs, curing ailments of those who sought her help from across Wales.

== Ynys Llanddwyn ==
Isle of Anglesey UK location map

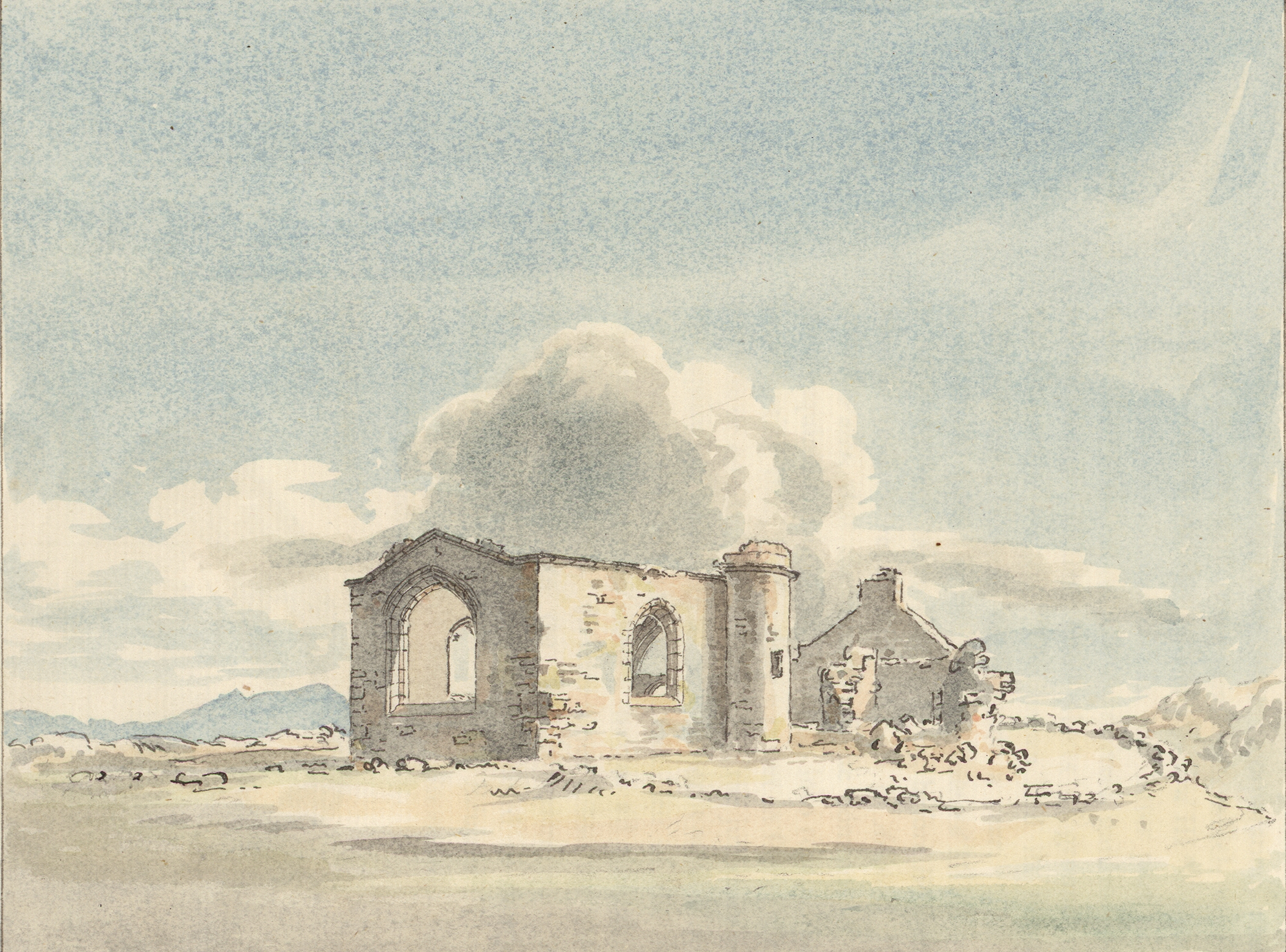
St Dwynwen's Church, Llanddwyn, c. 1778

Following her retreat from court life, Dwynwen withdrew to the small tidal island of Ynys Llanddwyn—off the southwest coast of Anglesey, near Newborough. There, she established a church known as Llanddwyn ("Church of Dwynwen"), whose ruins remain visible today.

== Veneration ==
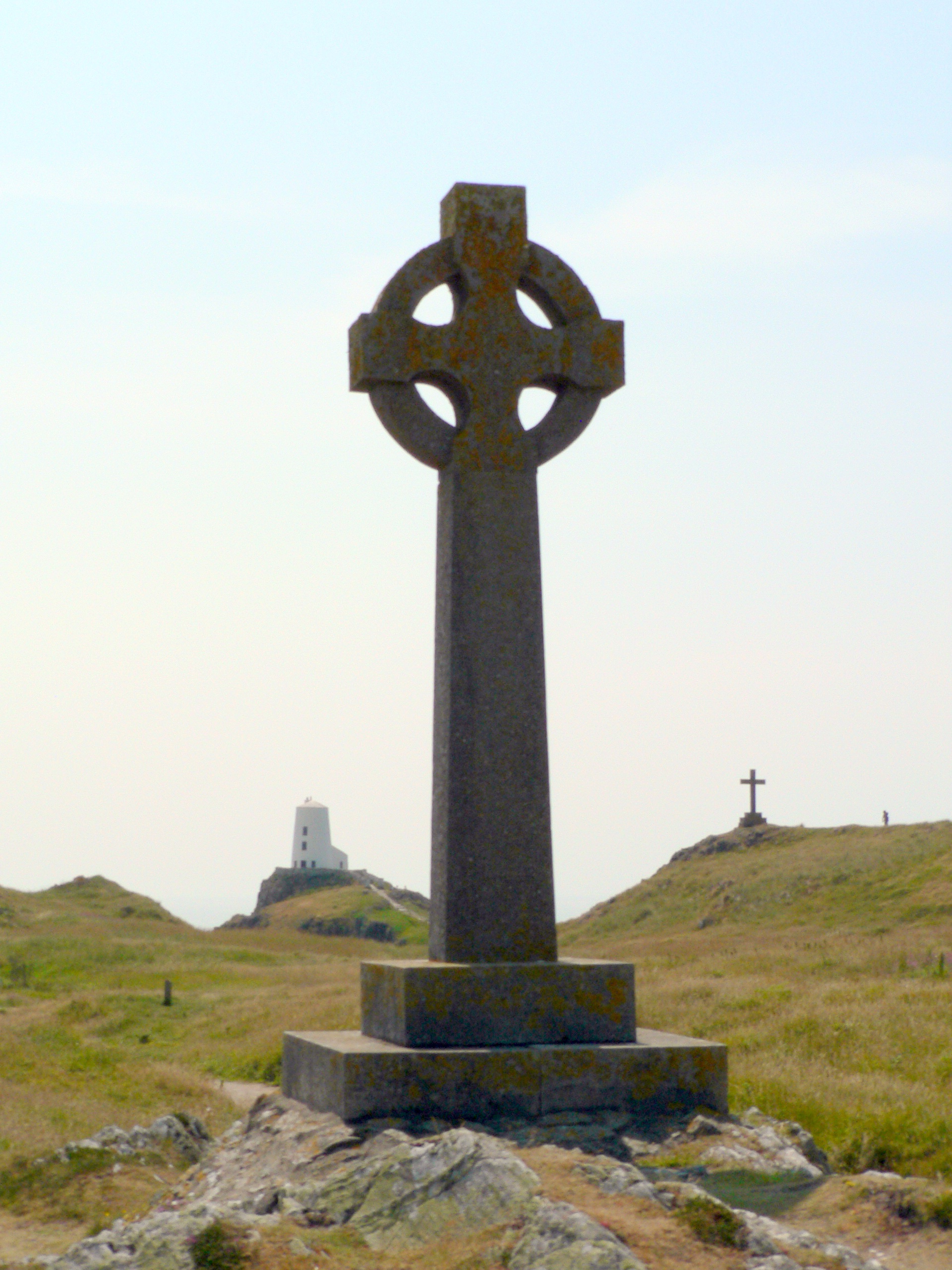
The Celtic Cross erected in 1903, with the older cross in the background

St Dwynwen's Church on Ynys Llanddwyn evolved into a major shrine during the Middle Ages. A holy well on the island, associated with Dwynwen, became a site of pilgrimage, where the movements of sacred fish within its waters were thought to forecast lovers' fortunes. Welsh poets Dafydd ap Gwilym and Dafydd Trefor recorded the saint's popularity by referencing the pilgrimages to Ynys Llanddwyn.

After the Reformation, activity at the shrine was suppressed. The area fell into disrepair, exacerbated by drifting sand. Pilgrims looking for a holy site increasingly turned to Saint Elian's Well nearby, though some continued to honour Dwynwen at her ruined church. In the late 19th century, the Oxford Movement—which revived some traditional devotional practices within Anglicanism—brought renewed attention to the site. Around 1879 ("the sixtieth year of Queen Victoria"), a plain cross approximately 14 feet high was erected on the island to commemorate Dwynwen.

In 1903, the Hon. F. G. Wynn of Glynllivon, son of the 3rd Baron Newborough, erected a more elaborate Celtic cross on Ynys Llanddwyn, again honouring the saint. Today, the site is part of a nature reserve and remains a popular spot for visitors.

Dwynwen is venerated in the Eastern Orthodox Church.

=== Patronage ===
Besides being recognised as the patron saint of Welsh lovers, Dwynwen is also considered a patron of sick animals.

== Dydd Santes Dwynwen ==
Dydd Santes Dwynwen (IPA: [ˈdɨːð ˈsantɛs ˈdʊɨnwɛn]; Welsh for St Dwynwen's Day) is considered the Welsh equivalent of Valentine's Day and is celebrated on 25 January, in honour of Dwynwen, the Welsh patron saint of lovers.

Calendars from the fifteenth century and later assign her feast day to 25 January. However, the 17th-century hagiographer Nicolas Roscarrok placed "St Dwin" on 13 July, suggesting that Dwin and Dwynwen were variants of the same saint. In his records, 25 January commemorates "Dwinwent" or "Damwent".

While she is not officially recognised in the modern calendars of the Catholic or Anglican Churches, Dwynwen is commemorated by some Orthodox communities and listed on Eastern Orthodox and certain traditional Catholic liturgical websites. She does not appear in the 2004 edition of the Roman Martyrology, the official Catholic calendar for Wales, nor in the 1995 revision of the Church in Wales calendar.

=== Present day ===
During the 1960s, a Bangor University student, Vera Williams, sought to revive St Dwynwen's Day by designing Welsh "Valentine's" cards. Local press and businesses embraced the idea, and by 2004, the celebration of 25 January as a feast for Welsh lovers was well established—Gwynedd Council even promoted it.

St Dwynwen's Day celebrations have grown in popularity, with events like concerts, parties, and the exchange of greeting cards becoming increasingly common. Though overshadowed by Valentine's Day, its recognition continues to spread. A major boost came in 2003 when the Welsh Language Board partnered with the supermarket Tesco to distribute 50,000 free St Dwynwen's Day cards across Wales. One of these cards contained a specially marked heart, entitling the finder to a prize. The board also encouraged alternative celebrations, such as hosting love-themed gigs, singles nights, romantic dinners, or composing love poetry in pubs. Traditional Welsh lovespoon-carving presentations also form part of the celebrations.

== Legacy ==
Dwynwen's name endures in several place names, including Ynys Llanddwyn and Porthddwyn on Anglesey in Wales, and the church of "Sen Adhwynn" in Advent, Cornwall.

Welsh composer Joseph Parry wrote the music for "Dwynwen", a chorus penned by Benjamin Williams for the 1896 Llandudno National Eisteddfod.

== See also ==
- Adwen – a related Cornish saint
