= Wooden spoon =

Utensil commonly used in food preparation

A wooden spoon is a utensil commonly used in food preparation. In addition to its culinary uses, wooden spoons also feature in folk art and culture.

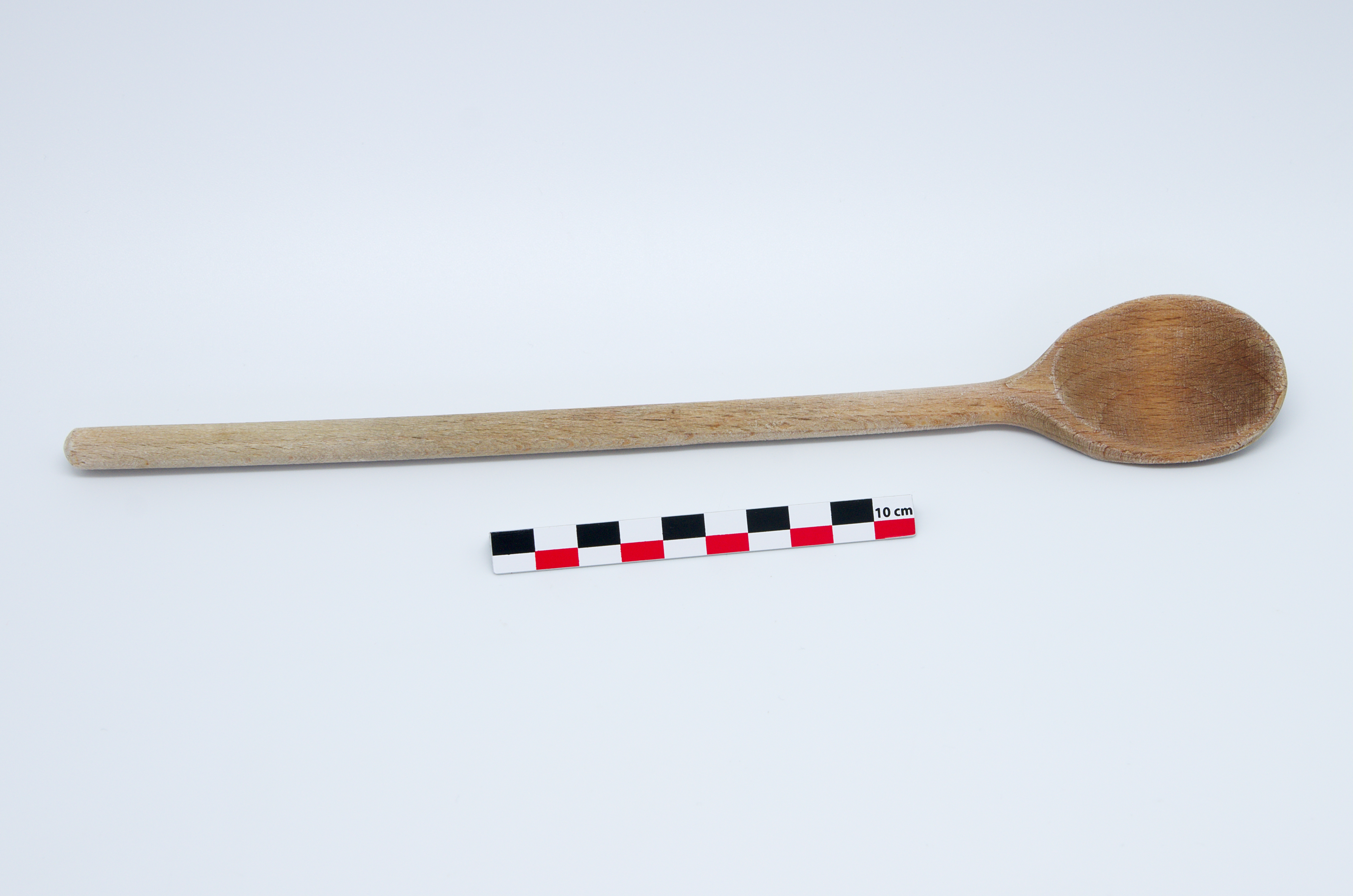
A typical wooden spoon

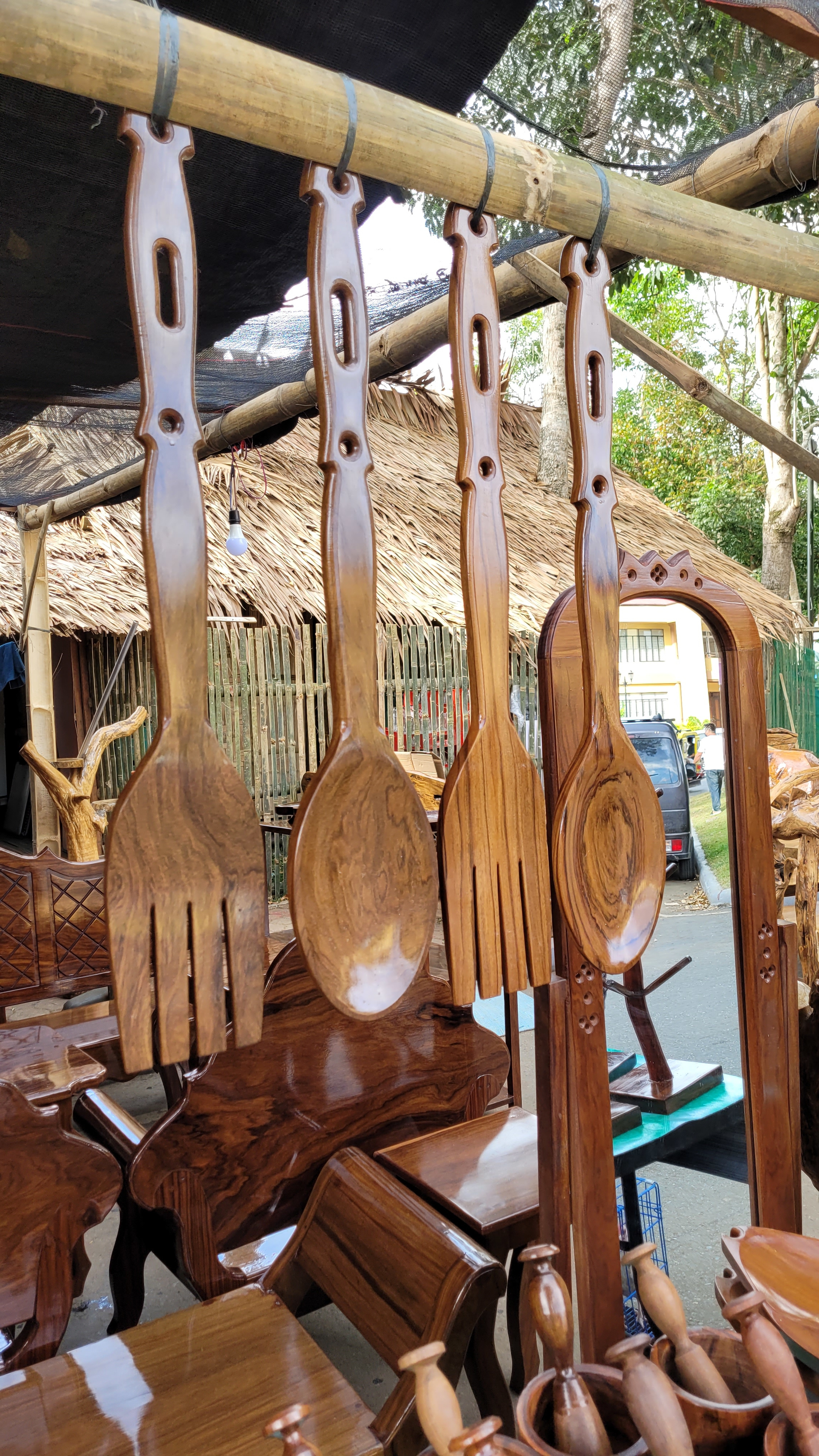
Giant wooden spoon and fork, used as traditional dining room decor in the Philippines

== History ==
The word spoon derives from an ancient word meaning a chip of wood or horn carved from a larger piece. Wooden spoons were easy to carve and thus inexpensive, making them common throughout history.

The Iron Age Celts (c. 250 BC) of Britain used them. This is evidenced by an example of a small ladle discovered during archaeological excavations at the Glastonbury Lake Village. Roman period spoons have been recovered from excavations in the City of London. The Anglo Saxons were great workers of wood, as were the Vikings, and both these groups of settlers to the British Isles produced wooden spoons for domestic uses.

== Uses ==
=== Practicality ===
==== Cooking ====
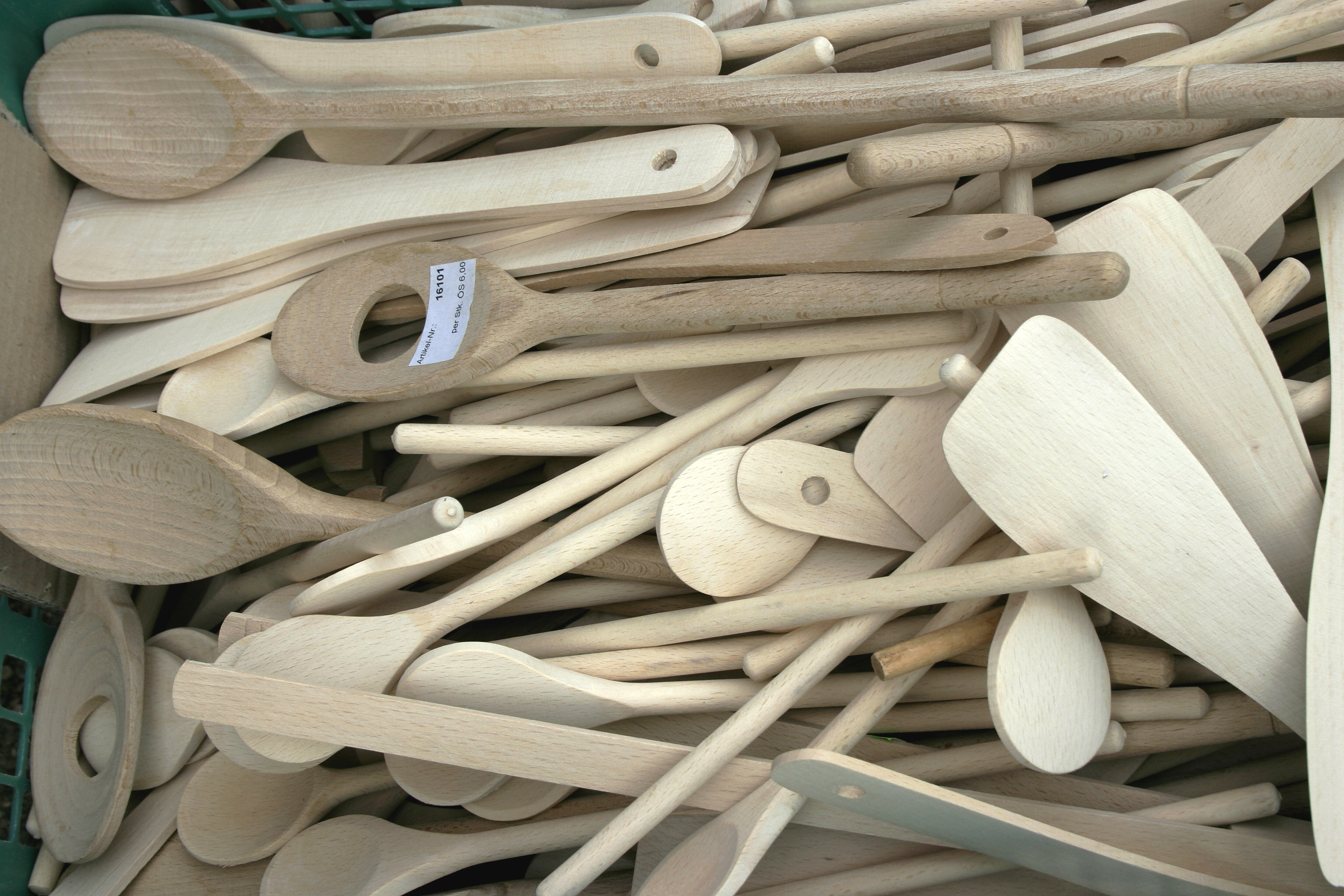
A number of wooden spoons, of various construction and purpose

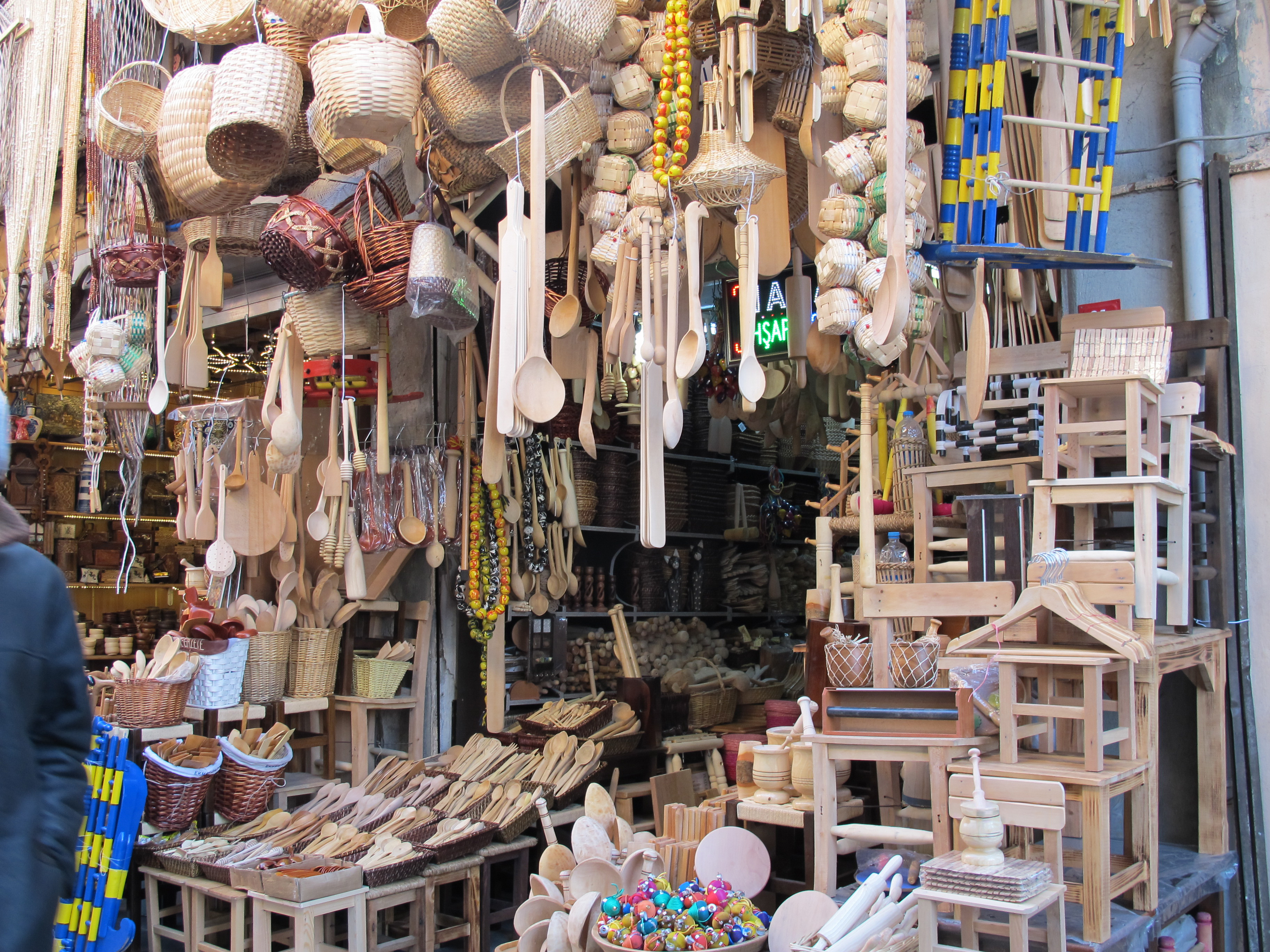
Store selling many types of wooden spoons, among other wooden objects, in Istanbul, Turkey

Today, wooden spoons in western cultures are generally medium to large spoons used for mixing ingredients for cooking or baking. They may be flat or have a small dip in the middle.

Before electric mixers became common, wooden spoons were often used to cream together butter and sugar in recipes such as shortbread or Victoria sponge cake.

They are still used for stirring many different kinds of food and beverages, especially soups and casseroles during preparation, although they tend to absorb strong smells such as onion and garlic. Wooden spoons are generally preferred for cooking because of their versatility. Some cooks prefer to use wooden spoons when preparing risotto because they do not transfer heat as much as metal spoons. Unlike metal spoons, they can also be safely used without scratching non-stick pans. This is useful when making dishes such as scrambled eggs.

Wooden spoons can be treated to protect from cold liquid absorption with coconut or mineral oil. Edible drying oils such as hempseed oil, walnut oil, and flax oil are used to create a more durable finish. For best results, drying oils should be given adequate time to polymerize after application before the spoon is used. Other vegetable oils should be avoided because they will undergo rancidification and leach into food during use. If the wood grain rises up after boiling or washing, a light sanding and application of coconut oil will prevent the spoon from becoming fuzzy and harboring bacteria.

=== Symbolism ===
==== Folk art ====
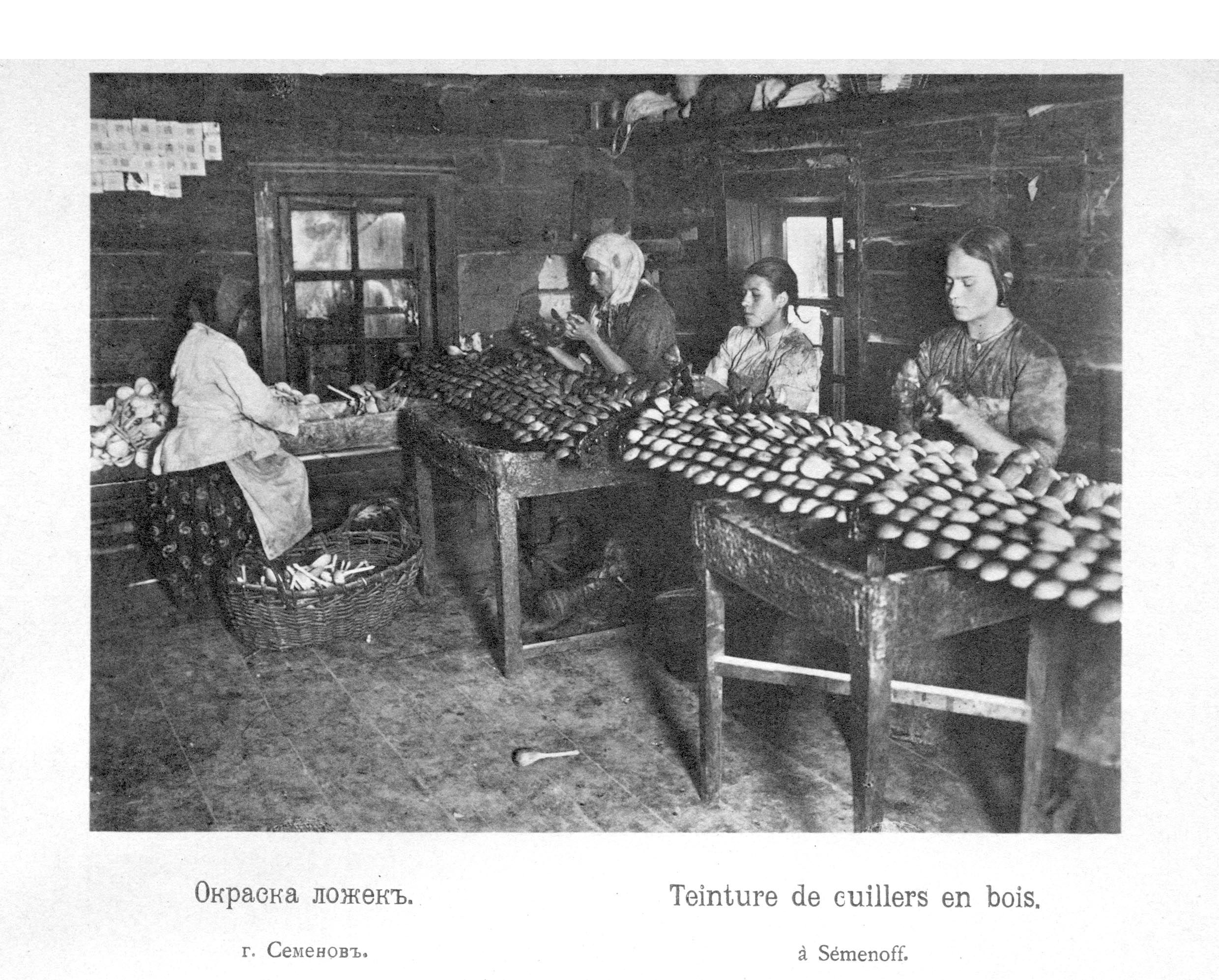
Workers painting wooden spoons. Semyonov, Russia, 1896

Wooden spoons have been made in virtually every nation on earth and (compared to silver or pewter or gold spoons) represent the ordinary artisan and reflect the life of ordinary folk: this is their "folk art".

Each region, sometimes each village, will produce its own very distinct style and type of spoon. Many African examples are carved with wild animals and are aimed at the tourist market; there are others that are ceremonial and contain much symbolism. Distinctive painted spoons have been made in the Khokhloma region of Russia for nearly 200 years, originally for domestic use and in more recent times as tourist objects.

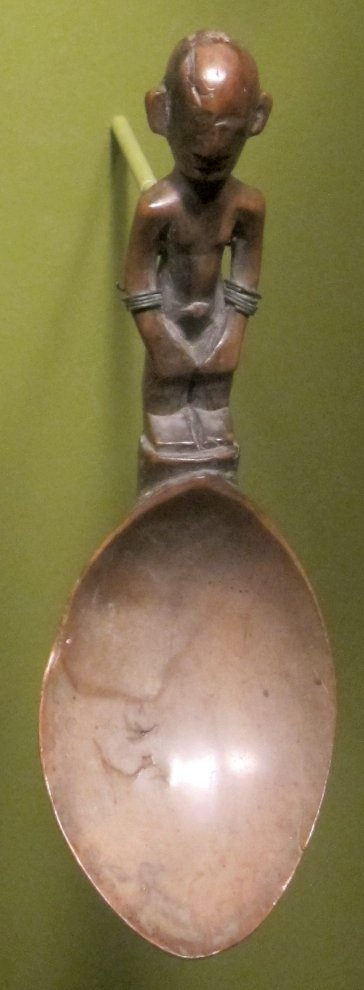
An Ifugao rice spoon from the Philippines in the Honolulu Museum of Art

In Wales, the intricately carved wooden lovespoon has been used as a token of affection. Each spoon could contain different meaning as shown by the use of various symbols, for instance: a chain would mean a wish to be together forever; a diamond would mean wealth or good fortune; a cross would mean faith; a flower would mean affection; or a dragon for protection.

In Botswana, the wooden spoon is used as a token to share duties, responsibilities and knowledge, the holder contributes to the work a hand, in whatever small way, like a group contributing to a dish by adding ingredients, mixed by with the spoon.

In the Philippines, wooden rice spoons with sacred carved images of bulul representing deities or ancestral spirits (anito) are traditional among the Ifugao peoples. Despite the animistic carvings, they are everyday utensils used for eating rice or soups or serving wine. Today, they are commonly sold as souvenirs to tourists.

In Romania, in the city of Câmpulung Moldovenesc, there is the Wooden Spoons Museum, a museum displaying the collection of wooden spoons from Romania and the world of a now deceased Romanian history professor.

==== Decor ====
In the Philippines, giant wooden spoons and forks are traditionally hung in the dining room, framed, or placed inside a cabinet. Both are the most common traditional utensil pairing in the Philippines (as opposed to the knife and fork in western countries). Along with a painting or tapestry of the Last Supper, they some of the more ubiquitous decorations in Filipino houses. They are regarded as symbols of good health.

==== Sporting culture ====
In some regions, particularly British-influenced ones of the Commonwealth and the United States, the "wooden spoon" is a booby prize for the team or individual finishing a competition in last position.

==== Corporal punishment ====
The wooden spoon has been used by parents, predominantly mothers, in some cultures as an implement used for corporal punishment. In the 21st Century it has become a symbol of nostalgia is Western culture, as its actual use has become culturally unacceptable.

== See also ==
- Treen
