= Treene =

Treene may refer to:

- Treene (Amt), an Amt in Schleswig-Holstein, Germany
- Treene (river), in Schleswig-Holstein, Germany

== See also ==
- Treen (disambiguation)
