= Loving cup =

Shared drinking container traditionally used at weddings and banquets

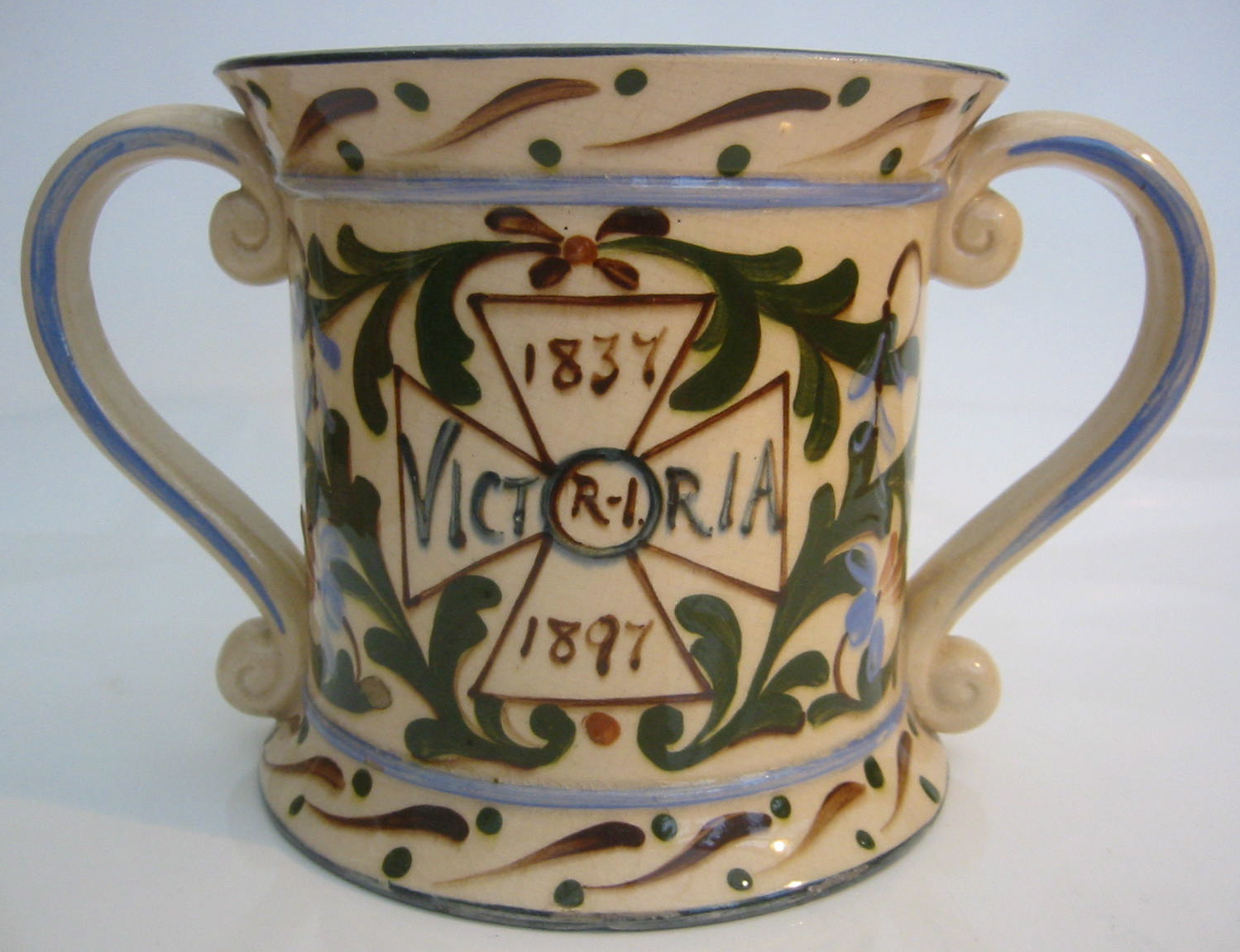
Porcelain loving cup for Queen Victoria's diamond jubilee (1897)

A loving cup is a large cup with two arching handles. It can describe a shared drinking container traditionally used at Christian lovefeasts, as well as at weddings and banquets, often made of silver. Loving cups are also given as trophies to winners of games or competitions.

== History ==
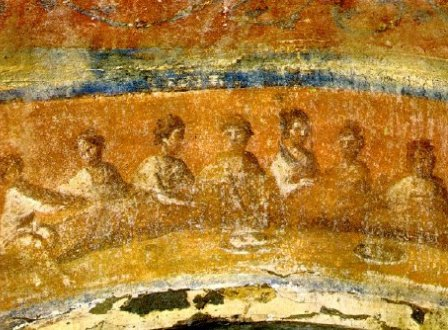
A depiction of an early Christian lovefeast

Two-handled tankards have been found in Europe dating back to perhaps the third millennium BCE.

Loving cups are found in several Christian denominations that practice the lovefeast, including the Schwarzenau Brethren, Moravians, and Methodists.

In addition, loving cups are found in the Celtic quaich and the French coupe de mariage.

The Russian bratina ("fraternity cup" or "brotherhood cup") is a wine bowl also used for banquets. It is considered the "Russian version of the loving cup". It is often without handles.

== See also ==
- Lovespoon
- The Emperor, a chamber pot now used as a loving cup
