= Garfield Mountain (Washington) =

Mountain in Washington (state), United States

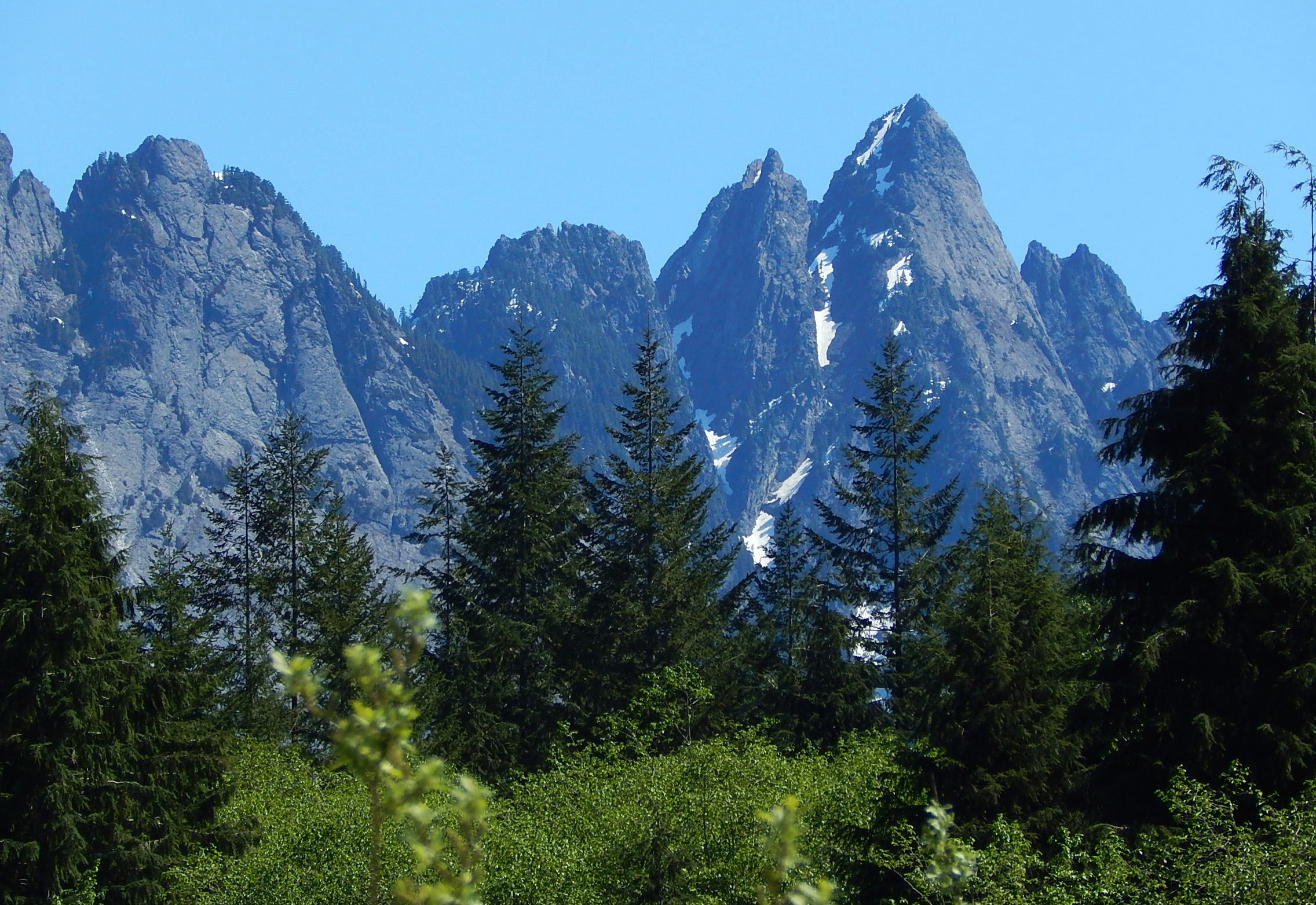
- Garfield Mountain from southwest

Highest point
- Elevation: 5,519 ft (1,682 m)
- Prominence: 839 ft (256 m)
- Parent peak: Treen Peak (5,763 ft)
- Isolation: 1.32 mi (2.12 km)
- Coordinates: 47°33′10″N 121°29′36″W

Geography
- Location within Washington (state) Location within the United States
- Country: United States
- State: Washington
- County: King
- Protected area: Alpine Lakes Wilderness
- Parent range: Cascade Range
- Topo map: USGS Snoqualmie Lake

Geology
- Rock type: granodiorite

Climbing
- First ascent: August 27, 1940 by Jim Crooks and Judson Nelson
- Easiest route: climbing

Garfield Mountain, also known as Mount Garfield, is a multi-peak summit located in King County of Washington state. It is located on the western edge of the Cascade Range and is within the Alpine Lakes Wilderness on land managed by Mount Baker-Snoqualmie National Forest. Mount Garfield is more notable for its large, steep rise above local terrain than for its absolute elevation. Precipitation runoff from the mountain drains into tributaries of the Snoqualmie River. Topographic relief is significant as it rises over 4,400 feet (1,300 meters) above the river in approximately one mile. The mountain's toponym honors James A. Garfield, the 20th President of the United States.

== Climate ==
Garfield Mountain is located in the marine west coast climate zone of western North America. Weather fronts originating in the Pacific Ocean travel northeast toward the Cascade Mountains. As fronts approach, they are forced upward by the peaks of the Cascade Range, causing them to drop their moisture in the form of rain or snow onto the Cascades (Orographic lift). As a result, the west side of the Cascades experiences high precipitation, especially during the winter months in the form of snowfall. Because of maritime influence, snow tends to be wet and heavy, resulting in high avalanche danger. During winter months, weather is usually cloudy, but, due to high pressure systems over the Pacific Ocean that intensify during summer months, there is often little or no cloud cover during the summer. The months of July through September offer the most favorable weather for viewing or climbing this mountain.

== Geology ==
The Alpine Lakes Wilderness features some of the most rugged topography in the Cascade Range with craggy peaks and ridges, deep glacial valleys, and granite walls spotted with over 700 mountain lakes. Geological events occurring many years ago created the diverse topography and drastic elevation changes over the Cascade Range leading to the various climate differences. These climate differences lead to vegetation variety defining the ecoregions in this area.

The history of the formation of the Cascade Mountains dates back millions of years ago to the late Eocene Epoch. With the North American Plate overriding the Pacific Plate, episodes of volcanic igneous activity persisted. In addition, small fragments of the oceanic and continental lithosphere called terranes created the North Cascades about 50 million years ago.

During the Pleistocene period dating back over two million years ago, glaciation advancing and retreating repeatedly scoured the landscape leaving deposits of rock debris. The last glacial retreat in the Alpine Lakes area began about 14,000 years ago and was north of the Canada–US border by 10,000 years ago. The U-shaped cross section of the river valleys is a result of that recent glaciation. Uplift and faulting in combination with glaciation have been the dominant processes which have created the tall peaks and deep valleys of the Alpine Lakes Wilderness area.

== See also ==
- List of peaks of the Alpine Lakes Wilderness
- Geography of Washington (state)

== Gallery ==
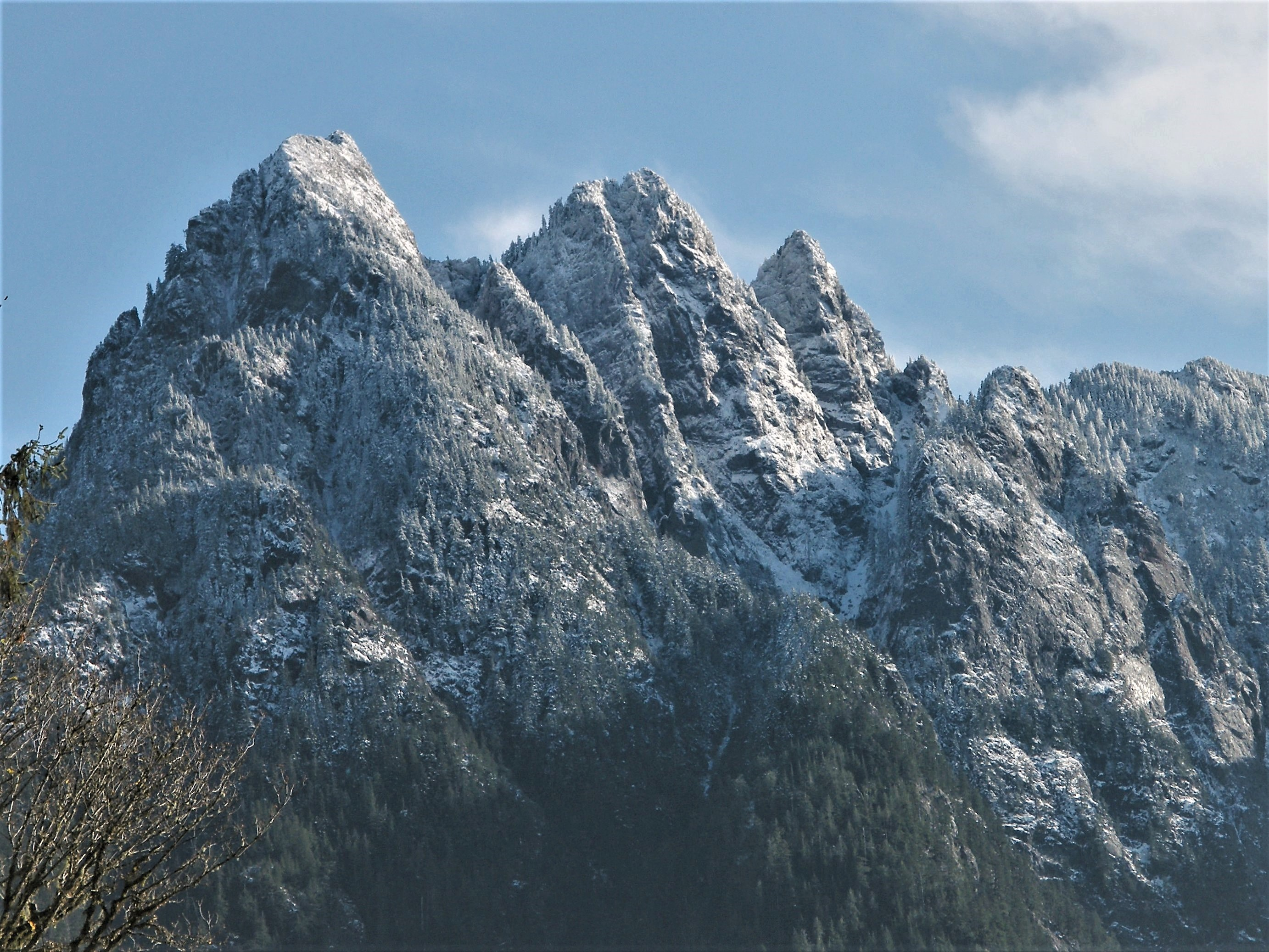
Mt. Garfield in autumn

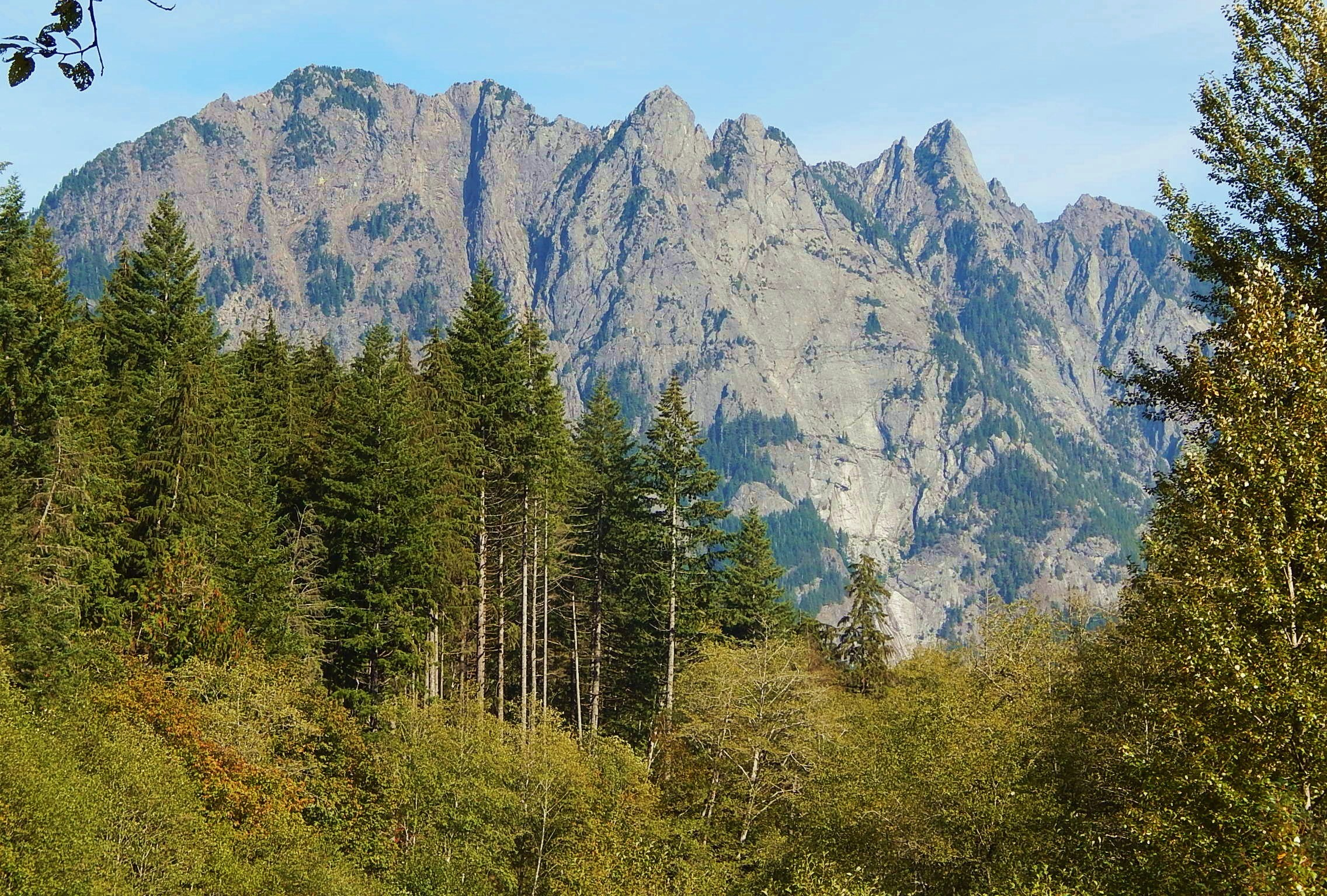
Garfield Mountain

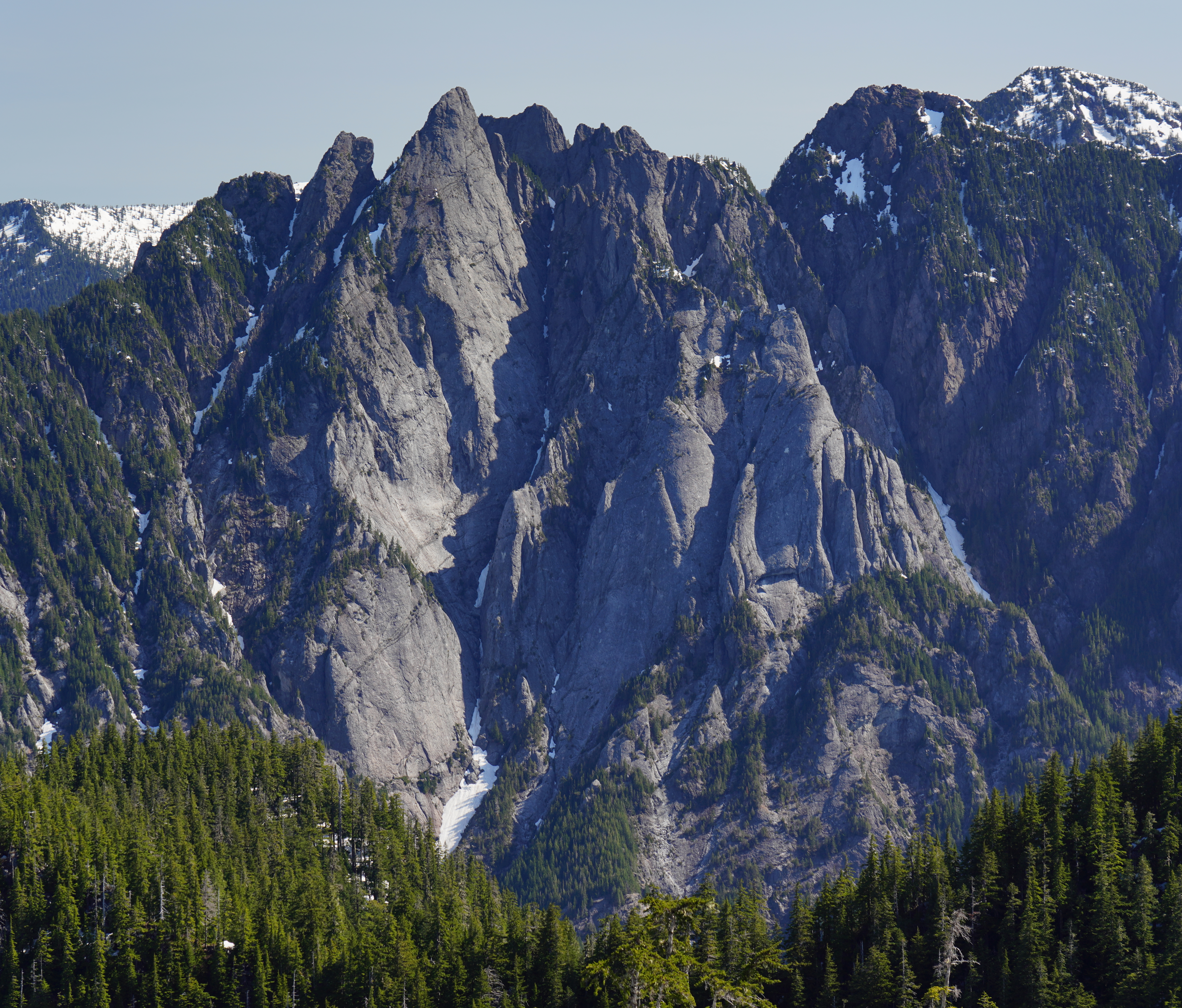
Garfield from Preacher Mountain

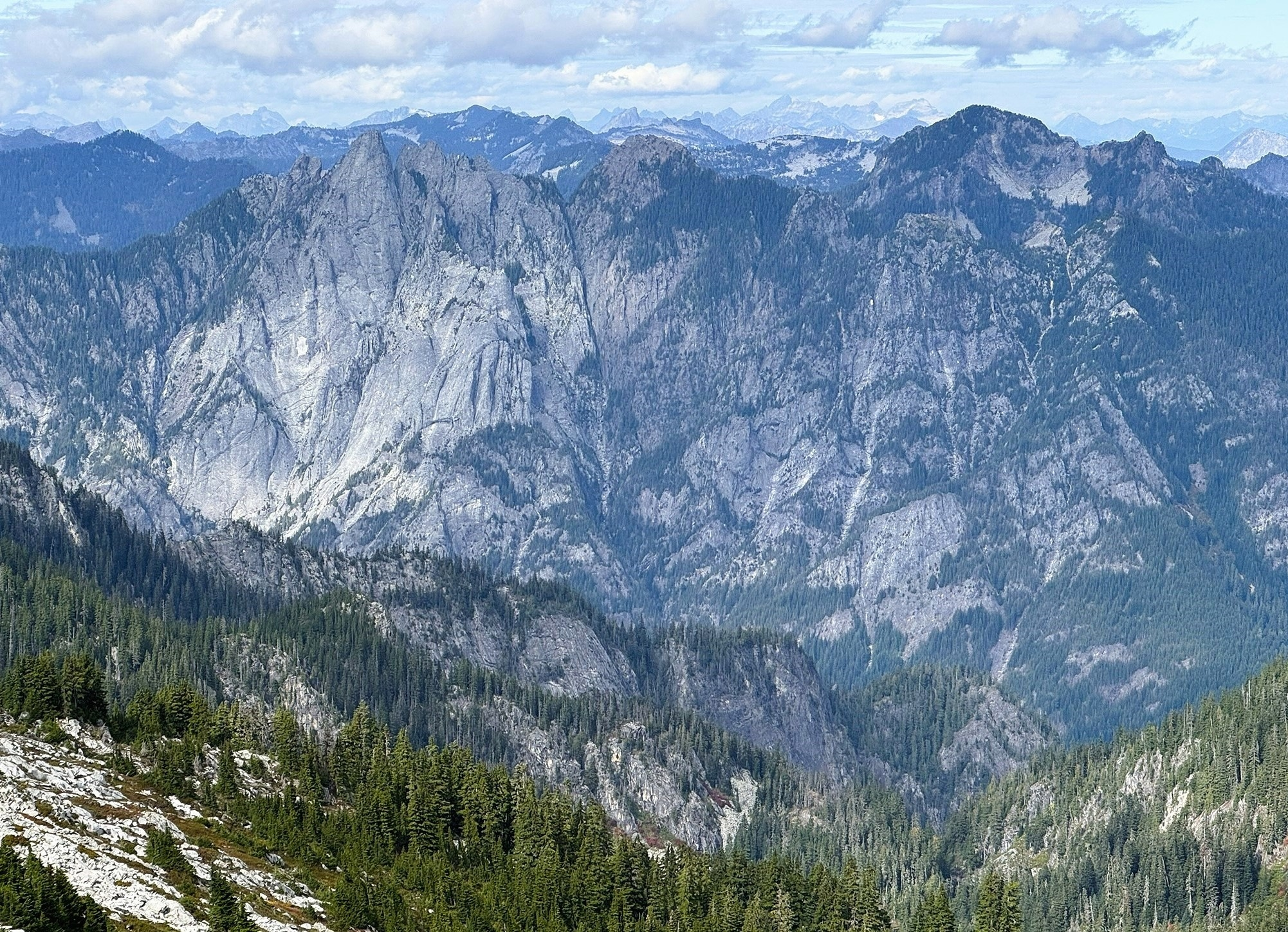
South aspect of Garfield Mountain (left) and Treen Peak (right)
