= Lovespoon =

Carved wooden spoon in Welsh culture

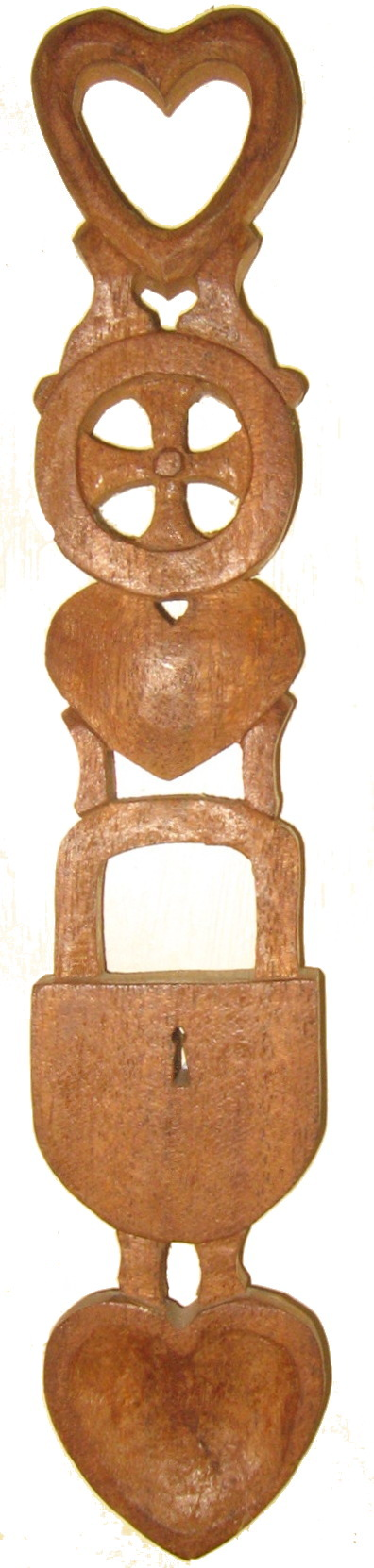
Welsh lovespoon featuring hearts, a lock and a wheel symbolising love, security and support respectively

A lovespoon (Welsh: Llwy garu) is a decoratively carved wooden spoon traditionally presented as a gift of affection and romantic intent in Wales. As the carving was a well-known Welsh tradition that required adept skill and concentration, the spoons were a demonstration of the carver's craftsmanship and commitment as well as their intent and desires through the intricate symbolism that developed over the centuries and became widely recognised throughout Wales.

Although lovespoons are most commonly associated with Welsh culture and are a national symbol, similar practices are found in cultures across the world.

== History ==
=== Origins ===
Carved wooden spoons with simple decorations are found throughout Northern Europe and the earliest lovespoons were designed to still be used as cutlery. While it is not known when the more ornate carvings of the Welsh tradition developed, it is thought to have existed for some centuries before the two earliest surviving examples were crafted in the mid-seventeenth century. One of these earliest spoons originates in Germany and has been dated to 1664, with a style typical of the area, featuring a round bowl finely engraved and a heavily carved spike-like handle. The second is a true Welsh lovespoon, and is part of the collection at the St Fagans National History Museum in Wales. dated to 1667, with an oval-shaped bowl and a heavier handle with heart-decorated finial. The Welsh spoon features early examples of the symbology that would remain a feature of Welsh lovespoons for centuries to come, such as two small "cages" containing "seeds" within them. Both spoons are so highly decorated as to be non-utilitarian and seemingly meant for decorative or ceremonial purposes only.

=== Eighteenth and nineteenth centuries ===
The tradition of lovespoons in Wales had been active for many generations by the eighteenth and nineteenth centuries, when most of the lovespoons in the collection of the National Museum of Wales date from. These spoons were crafted by male suitors from a single piece of close-grain wood (such as sycamore, box and fruit woods) using an ordinary pocket-knife and the traditional twca cam (English: bent knife) a tool consisting of a curved blade and a long handle which allowed the carver to hollow out a deep bowl. In terms of crafting skills, the objective of a lovespoons was to demonstrate the carvers technical skill and ability to use common tools. These were practical skills that signaled the man possessed an ability to work with his hands; a necessary skill in a time when most people could only earn their living from manual work, and demonstrate his ability to bring home an income if they married.

A lovespoon collection in a museum in Carmarthenshire, including three extremely ornate spoons with wide handles and three bowls each

However, the lovespoon also enabled the carver to demonstrate his adoration and hopes for the future through commonly understood symbology of each detail such as rings, loops, chains, and sliding balls. As this practice developed, the width of the spoon handles (in which such details could be carved) increased to be two or three times wider than the bowl. Some of the most ornate Welsh lovespoons became totally unusable, with the wide handles also featuring two or more bowls, symbolising "two souls with but a single thought, two hearts that beat as one."

=== Modern lovespoons ===
Traditional lovespoons are found today in museums and historic buildings across Wales, with the National Museum of Wales housing its own collection, and the St Fagans National History Museum holding more than 300 spoons. However, there are far fewer examples of hand carved lovespoons in the early 20th century and mass-produced lovespoons became more prominent from the mid-twentieth century onwards. Lovespoons are not normally presented as courting gifts today, but are given as keepsakes at weddings, anniversaries, birthdays, christenings, Valentine's Day, and the festival of the Welsh saint of love; Dydd Santes Dwynwen. Due to these changes, the mass produced lovespoons seldom feature the traditional symbols, instead featuring Welsh national symbols such as daffodils and the Welsh Dragon.

It is a tradition for the youngest member of the Welsh rugby teams to carry a giant lovespoon when the team play abroad on tours and at the Rugby World Cups. The love spoon represents the friendship the team bring from Wales to the host nation and extending to everyone they meet. The meter high spoon was carried by George North at the 2011 Rugby World Cup, Tyler Morgan in 2015, Rhys Carré in 2019 and most recently by Dafydd Jenkins in 2023.

== Symbolism ==
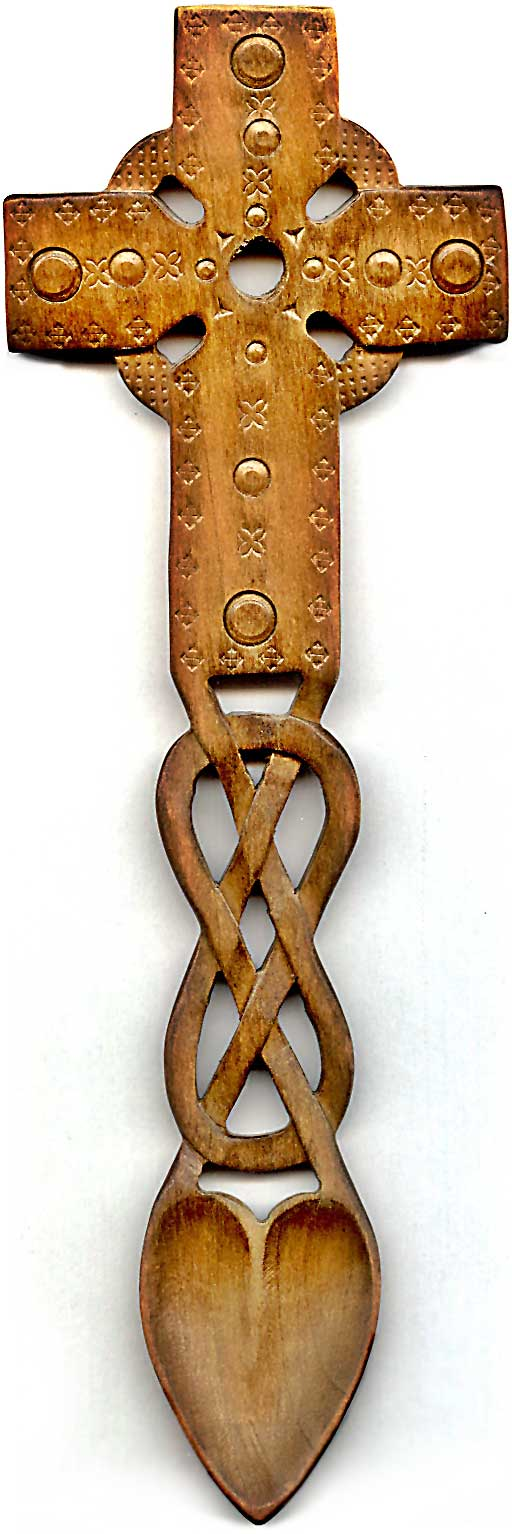
A traditional lovespoon featuring a prominent Celtic Cross (left) and a giant lovespoon under construction in Caerleon featuring the Welsh Dragon with chains (right)

While the gifting of lovespoons to a young woman by her suitor, may have initially developed as a way to prove oneself a capable craftsman (and therefore demonstrate to her father an ability to provide for the woman and their future family), the intricate features became widely recognised symbols of the intentions and desires of the carver. As such Welsh lovespoons are unique in the extensive symbology of the carved features. These symbols include:

- Anchors a symbol of good luck, often carved when men were away at sea.
- Bells for marriage
- Caged balls or sliding spheres, A variety of loose wooden balls carved to be feely moving, but secured within the spoon indicated the number of children hoped for. This is symbolic of female fertility as the ball represents an embryo inside a womb.
- Chain links, the chains carved as if attached to the handle represented that accepting the lovespoon was accepting a romantic attachment, while chains carved into the handle itself would represent the children hoped for, with each chainlink symbolising each child.
- Celtic cross for faith
- Celtic knot, representing togetherness;
- Diamonds for prosperity
- Flowers representing how love would "blossom" and grow
- Hearts for love
- Horseshoes for good luck
- House shapes, represent domestic contentment
- Keys symbolise the presenting of the carvers home to the recipient
- Lock for security
- Paisley shape, said to represent the soul and deep affection
- Vines, symbolising growing affection
- Welsh Dragon, the symbol of Wales.
- Welsh Harp to represent harmony
- Wheel supporting a loved one

Other features may include the initials of the carver and the recipient, as well as the date when the lovespoon was gifted, Double bowls, where a single lovespoon is carved with two or more bowls, indicating the union of souls or the number of children desired.

A modern mass-produced lovespoon with stylised symbols including hearts and a Welsh hat

== Similar practices in other cultures ==
Lovespoon traditions are found throuhgout the world, with Welsh sailors and emigrants possibly influencing some of the later traditions.

=== Netherlands ===
The practice of gifting a spoon to a potential lover also developed in The Netherlands from c. 1870 to c. 1900. The spoons are known as Bonbon spoons as they were designed to serve candy, and tended to be carved with illustrations featuring romantic courting couples engaged in playing music, with entwined lovebirds, or intertwined dolphins, the latter being considered a symbol of eternal love. However, Bonbon spoons were more traditionally made from silver.

=== Norway ===
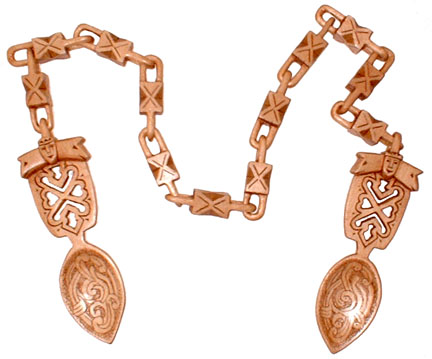
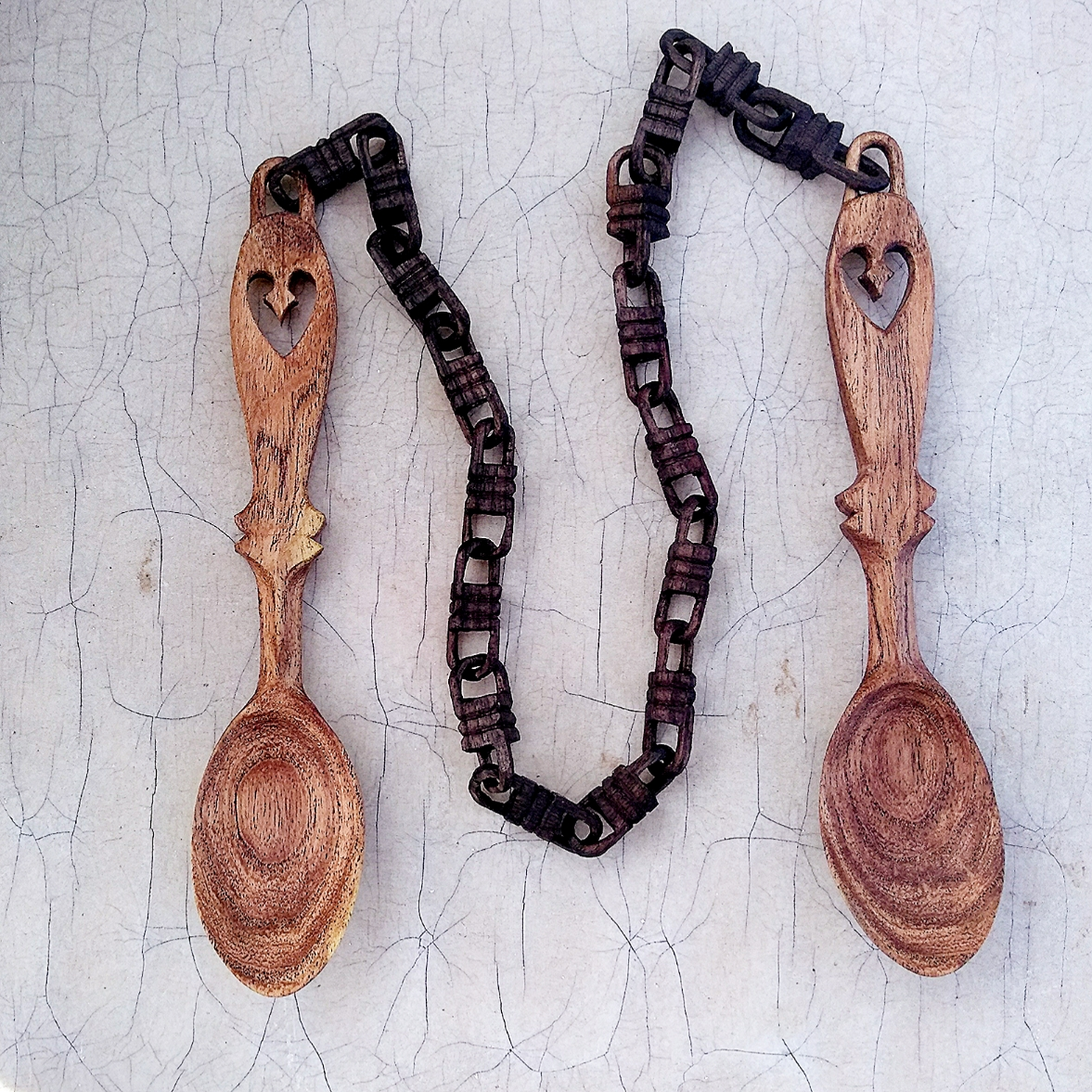
Norwegian linked wedding spoons

From the mid-19th century to the early 20th century newly married couples in Norway ate with linked spoons during the second day of the wedding ceremony to symbolize the linkage of their marriage. In Norwegian folklore, the practice originated when young courting couples would be permitted to sit together unchaperoned, in an unheated room. Afterwards, the boy's hands would then be inspected by his prospective father-in-law for signs that the boy had been busy carving rather than keeping his hands warm by touching his potential partner. At the wedding, the spoon would be used by the couple to feed each other the wedding cake, before being hung above the door of their home and even worn by the wife around her neck when the husband was away.

=== Mozambique and South Africa ===
Tsonga linked spoon with wooden pot

Two chain-linked wooden spoons, carved from a single piece of wood is also a tradition of the Tsonga people (and related peoples like the Zulu and Shona) of southeastern Africa. The spoons have many of the elements of Welsh lovespoons, featuring traditional woodcarvings that incorporate geometric patterns, disc-shaped finials and heart-shaped bowls that are intended for use in cultural events rather than as utensils that demonstrate the ubuciko (English: craftsmanship) of their creators.

== See also ==
- Dydd Santes Dwynwen
- Loving cup
- Treen
- Wooden spoon
