= Treen Cove =

Tidal beach in Cornwall, England

Coordinates: 50.18904°N 5.59482°W

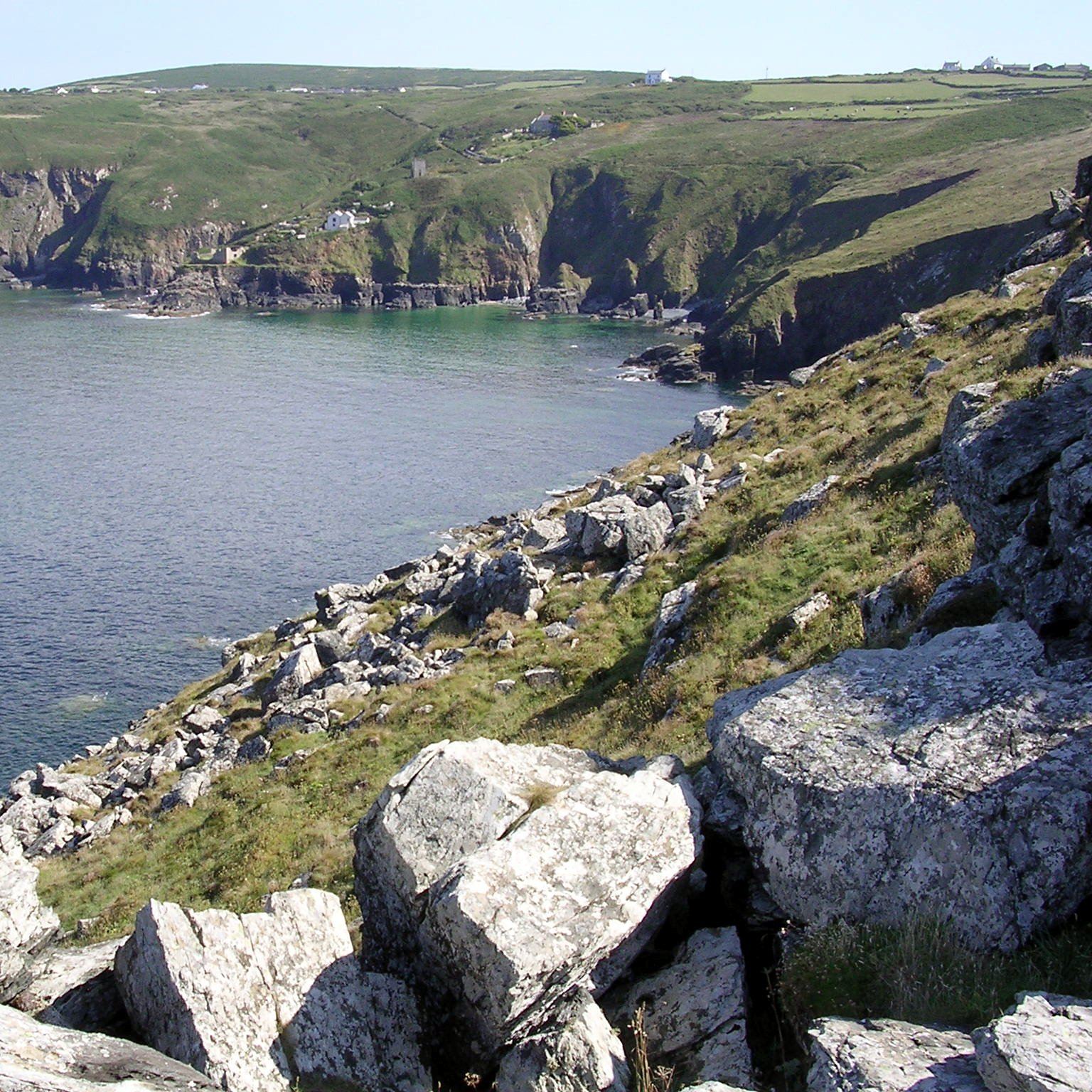
Treen Cove at high tide, from Gurnard's Head

Treen Cove (grid reference SW435383) is a tidal beach on the north coast of the Penwith peninsula, Cornwall, England, UK. It is about half a mile northwest of the hamlet of Treen, and nestles between Lean Point to the east and Gurnard's Head to the west. The name of this cove is from the Cornish 'tre' (farm, settlement) and 'din' (fort), referring to the adjacent Iron Age promontory fort at Gurnard's Head.

Francis Kilvert reported that on 29 July 1870 in Treen Cove ″Fishing boats lay up in this cove, sheltered from the stormy sea by a large guardian-rock.″
