= Rigrawst =

Queen consort of King Brychan Brycheiniog

Queen Rigrawst was one of the queens consort of King Brychan Brycheiniog, the legendary 5th-century king of Brycheiniog in South Wales.

== Family ==
Born 468 AD, she was the daughter of Gwrtheyrn ap Gwidol the High King of Britain and Sevira, daughter of the Roman Emperor Magnus Maximus who visited Wales in 383AD and according to legend his wife Saint Elen. She is reputed to have been the mother of at least twenty children who themselves became saints.
