= Treen =

Small household objects made from wood

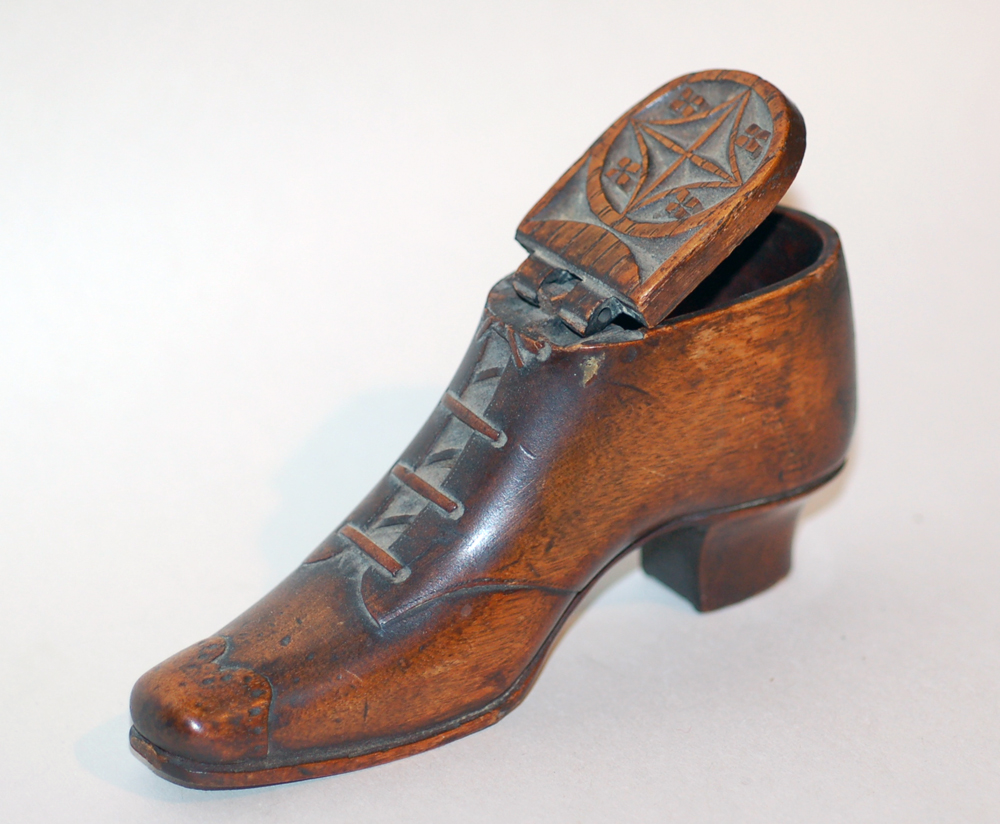
Nineteenth century carved walnut treen snuff box

Treen (literally "of a tree") is a generic name for small handmade functional household objects made of wood. Treen is distinct from furniture, such as chairs, and cabinetry, as well as clocks and cupboards. Before the late 17th century, when silver, pewter, and ceramics were introduced for tableware, most small household items, boxes and tableware were carved from wood. Today, treen is highly collectable for its patina and tactile appeal.

Anything from wooden plates and bowls, snuff boxes and needle cases, spoons and stay busks to shoehorns and chopping boards can be classed as treen. Domestic and agricultural wooden tools are also usually classed with treen.

Before the advent of cheap metal wares in industrialized societies, and later plastic, wood played a much greater part as the raw material for common objects. Turning and carving were the key manufacturing techniques. The selection of wood species was important, and close-grained hardwoods such as box, beech and sycamore were particularly favoured, with occasional use of exotics, such as lignum vitae for mallet heads.

Wooden objects have survived relatively less well than those of metal or stone, and their study by archaeologists and historians has been somewhat neglected until recently. Their functional and undecorated forms have, however, been highly regarded by designers and collectors.

== Burl treen ==
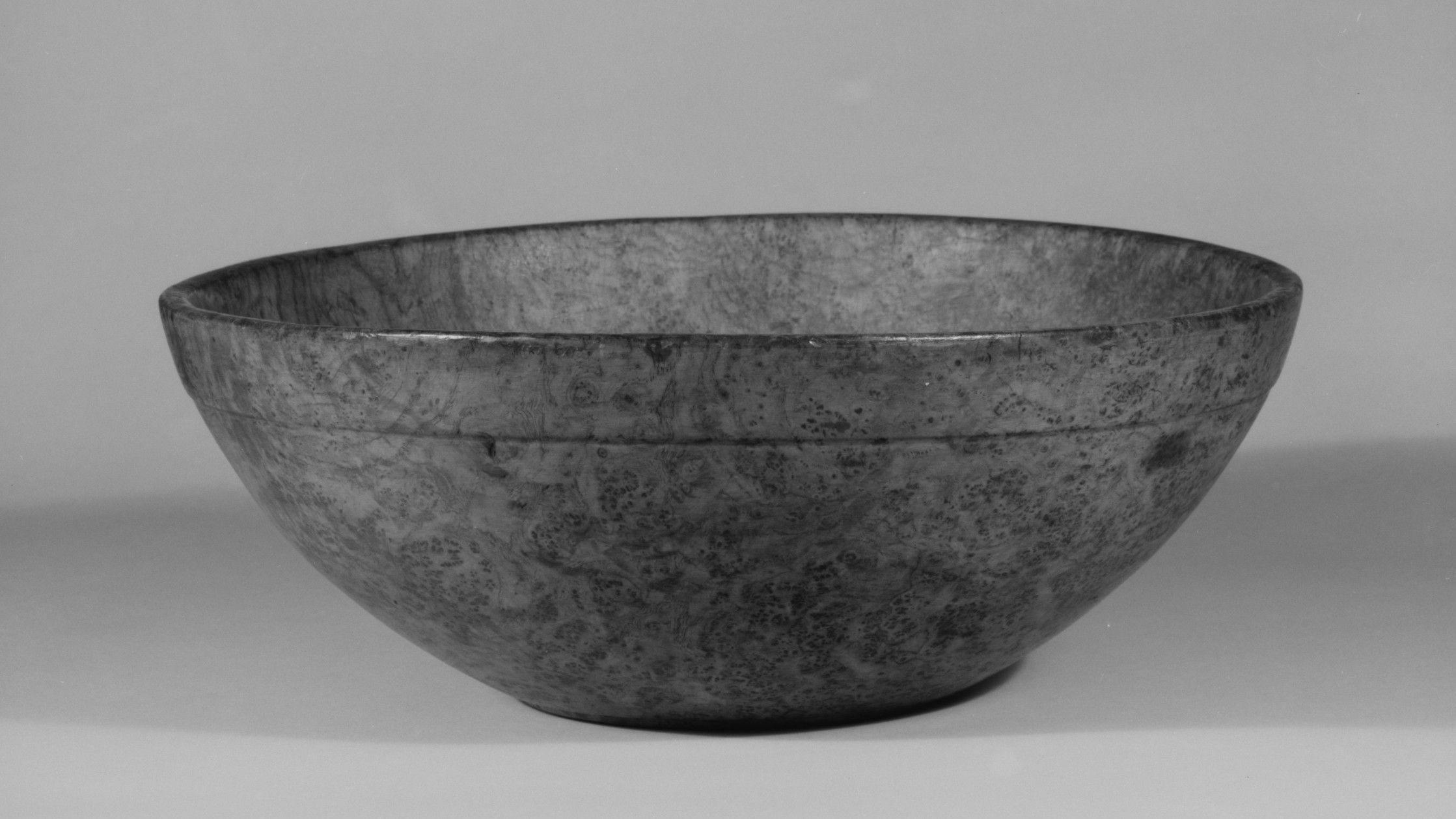
Burl bowl, probably USA, circa 1820

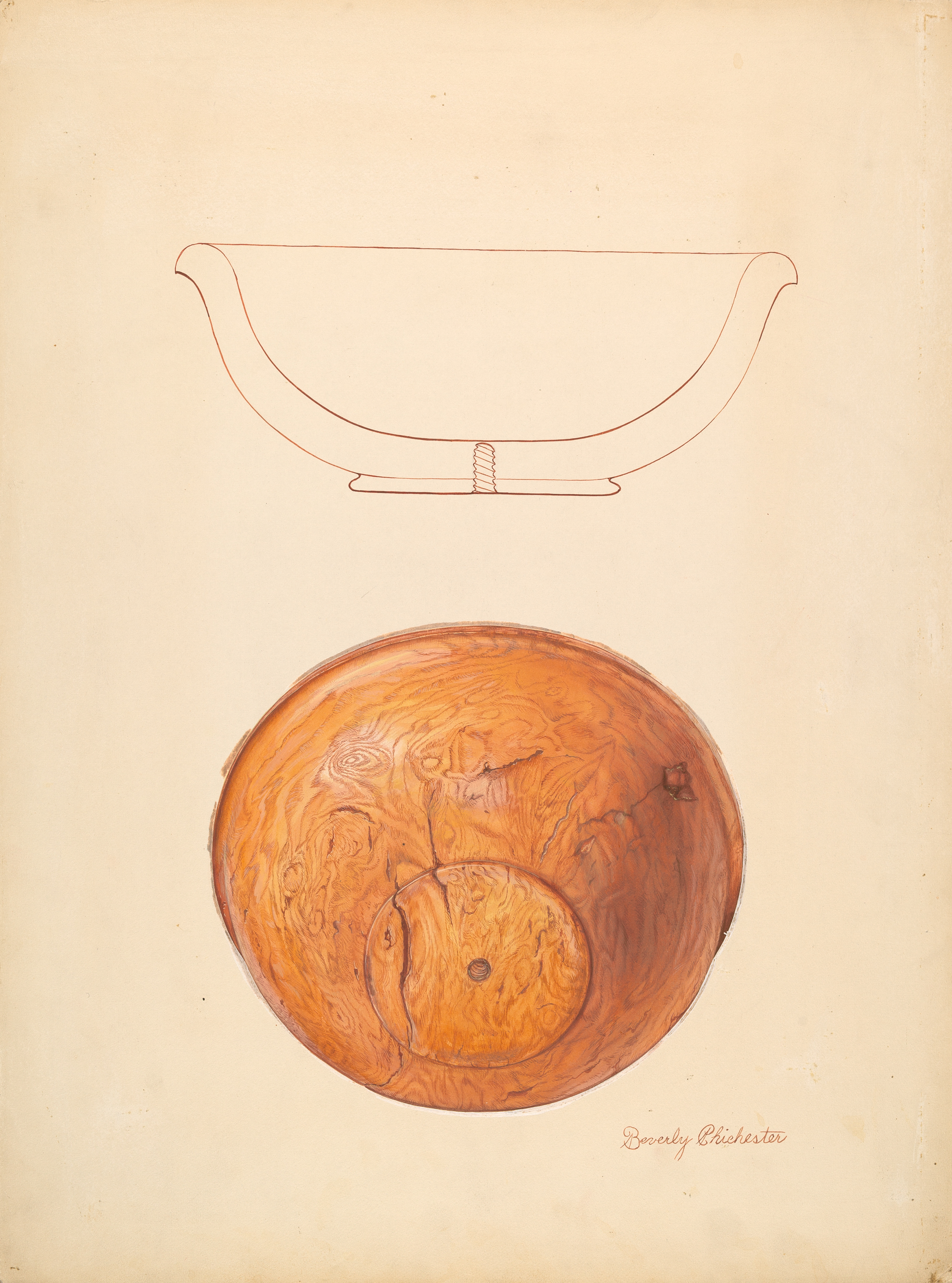
Lathe-turned Walnut Burl Bowl, painted c. 1936

In North America, Native Americans carved tree burls into durable wooden objects with uniquely marbled grain. Burls were rare in Europe because the old-growth forests where they are commonly found had largely been logged out of existence. Burl treen was found in Europe occasionally, particularly in objects intended for celebration or the upper class, but was not in wide-scale use.

In contrast, burls were widely available in the virgin forests of North America. Native Americans worked these burls into domestic objects like bowls and ladles with tools such as stone blades, hot coals, and beaver teeth. Native Americans traded these wooden items with European colonists, who later learned to harvest burls and carve them into treen in the style of their home countries. Burl treen is considered an indigenous North American craft, and examples are found in museums and private collections of Americana.

The snarled and interlaced grain of a burl makes the resulting objects stronger and less likely to split. They were strong enough to be passed down over generations. A variety of trees produce burls, but almost all North American burl treen (upwards of ninety percent) is made from black ash. Another five percent is made from maple, with other woods such as cherry wood, white cedar, oak, and birch making up the remainder. Woodworker Michael Combs has speculated that black ash burl was favored because it is easy to work on a lathe.

== See also ==
- Lovespoon
- Wooden spoon
