= Gurnard's Head =

Headland on the north coast of Cornwall, England

Coordinates: 50.19160°N 5.59922°W

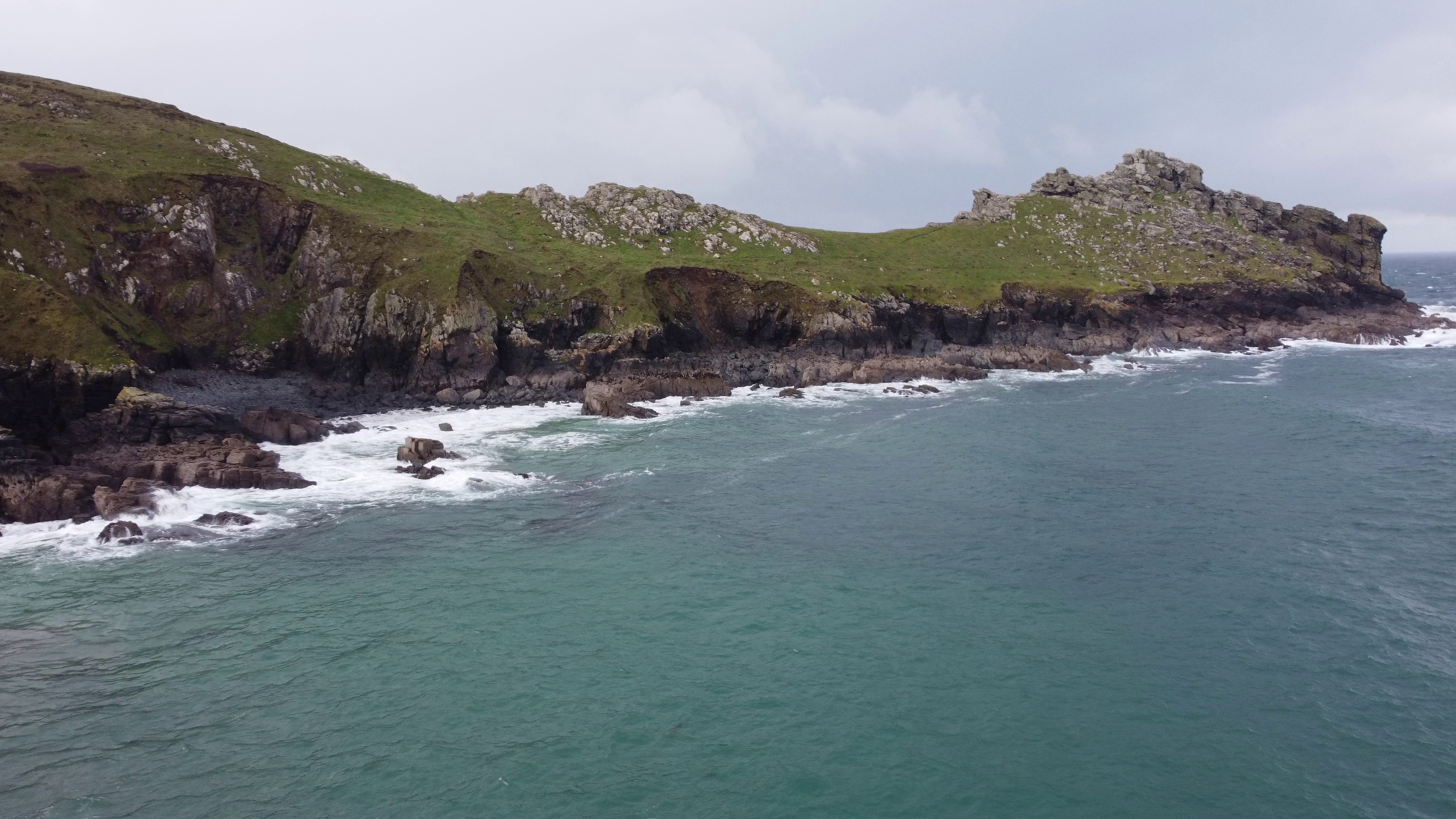
Gurnard's Head from a drone

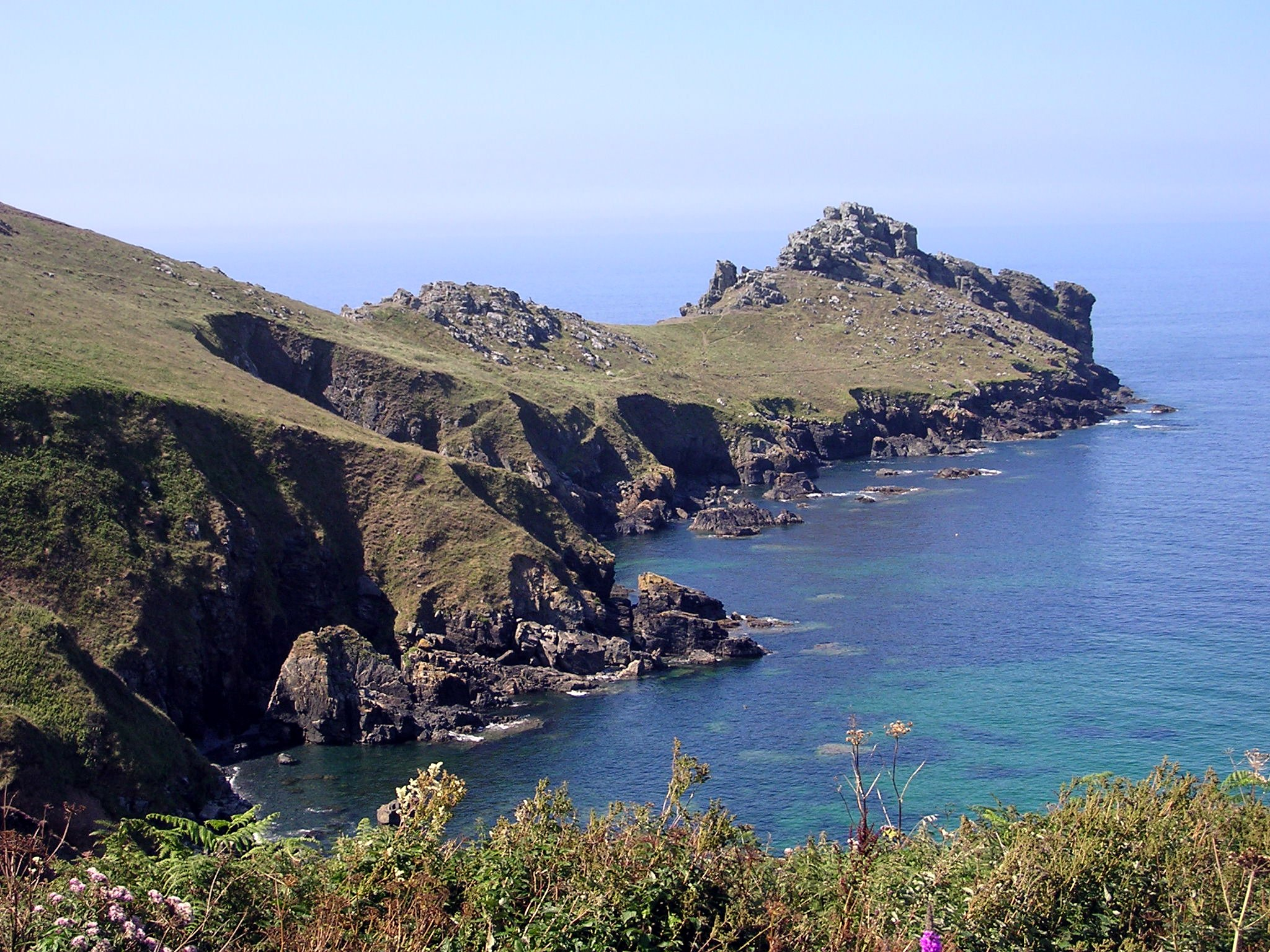
Gurnard's Head promontory from the southeast

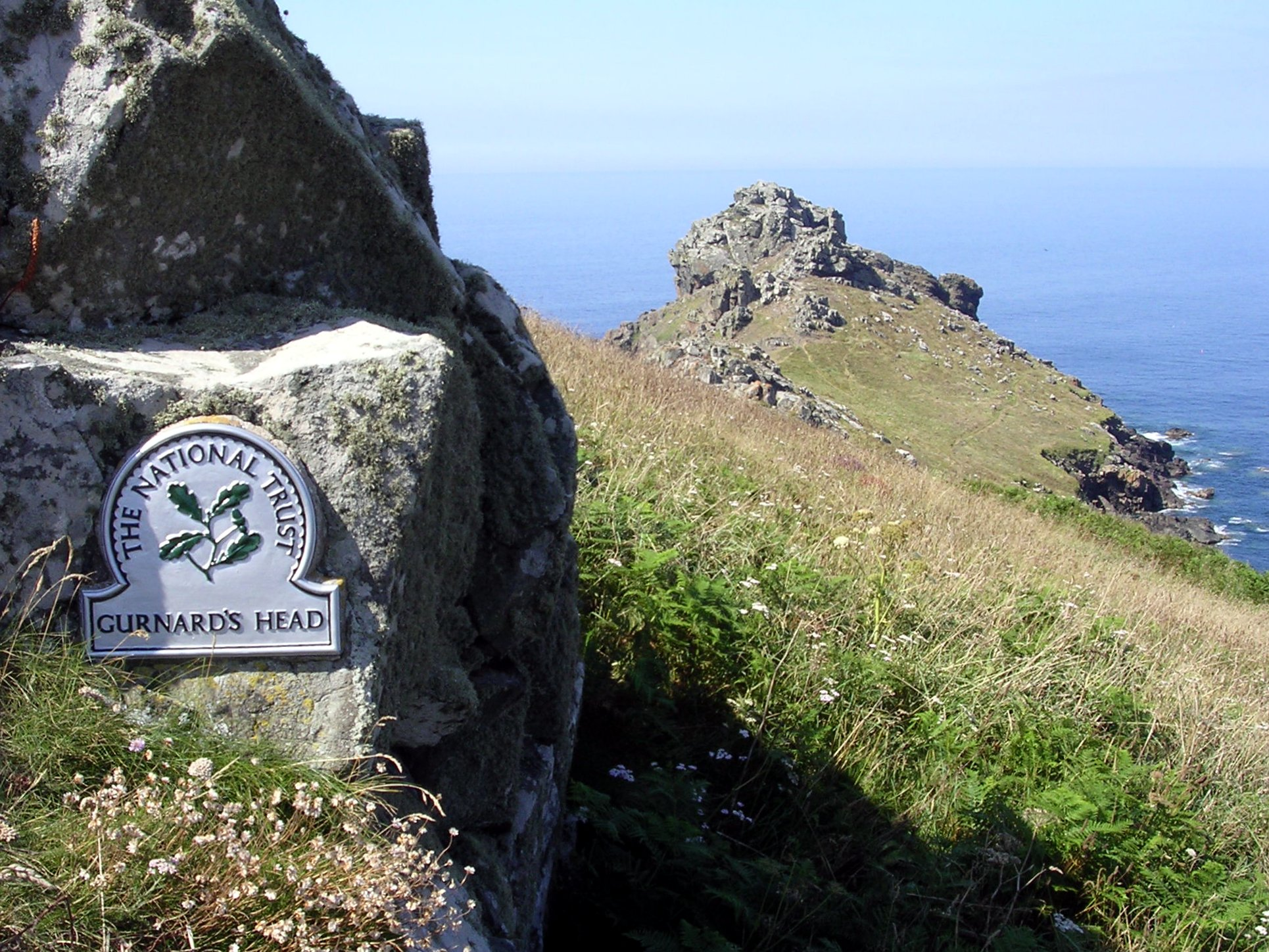
Gurnard's Head is in the care of the National Trust.

Gurnard's Head (Cornish: Ynnyal, meaning desolate; grid reference SW432386) is a prominent headland on the north coast of the Penwith peninsula in Cornwall, England. The name is supposed to reflect that the rocky peninsula resembles the head of the gurnard fish.

== Geography and geology ==
Gurnard's Head is the site of basaltic pillow lavas, formed by underwater volcanic eruptions up to 400 million years ago.

It is north of the hamlet of Treen in the parish of Zennor, 1 mile (1.6 km) to the west of Zennor Head. Almost entirely owned by the National Trust, the headland is within the Aire Point to Carrick Du SSSI, and the 630 mi (1,010 km) South West Coast Path crosses the southern part of the headland. The area is designated as part of the Penwith Heritage Coast and also designated as part of the Cornwall Area of Outstanding Natural Beauty. A pub and hotel on the B3306 coast road shares a name with the headland.

== History ==
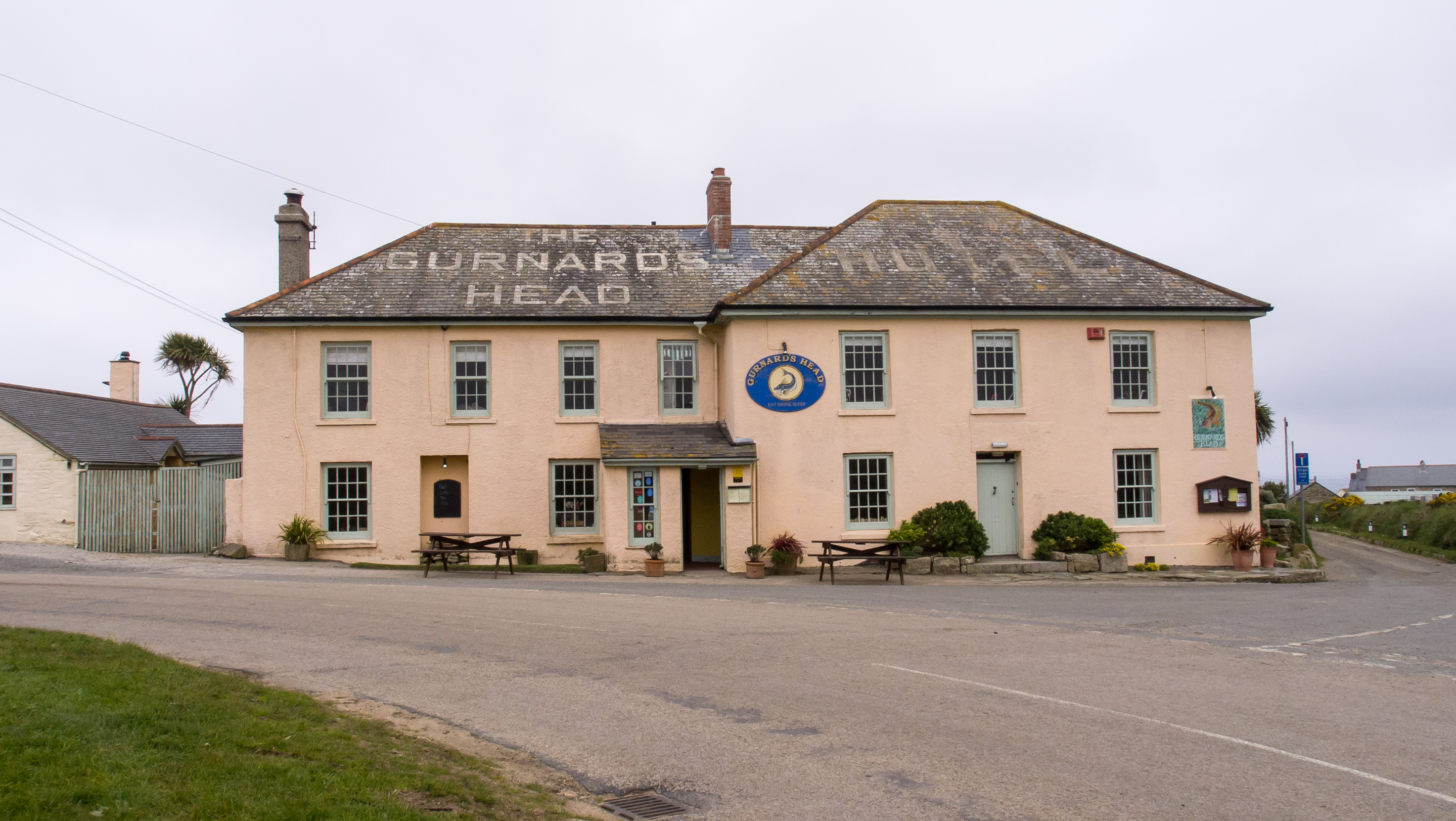
The Gurnard's Head Hotel, viewed from the road.

The headland is the site of an Iron Age promontory fort known as Trereen Dinas (not to be confused with Treryn Dinas). On the cliff-edge, above Treen Cove are the remains of Chapel Jane, which could have been a guild chapel of local fisherman. The earliest pottery dates from AD 1100 to 1150, but the original simple structure of the chapel is comparable with the tiny chapels of St Helen's and Teän, on the Isles of Scilly. An association with the adjoining stream which according to local, 19th-century, tradition was regarded as a holy well, could indicate an earlier, possibly 8th-century founding.

To the east of the headland is an engine house belonging to a copper mine, originally known as Treen Copper Mine (before 1821) and later renamed Gurnard's Head Mine.

There are two small coves to the east of, and sheltered by Gurnard's Head; Treen Cove and Rose-an-Hale Cove. In 1870, the Gurnard's Head seine fishery was worth an estimated £800 per year and employed 24 men with 10 boats and two seines. The pilchards (Sardina pilchardus) were sold locally as fresh pilchards rather than salted and sold as fumadoes for the Mediterranean market. The Western Fishing Company was dissolved and their assets were auctioned on 28 June 1880. Included were the Account-house furniture, cellars, lofts and buildings used in the pilchard fishery as well as a launching platform in the cove. There were 14 boats (senn boats, loaders and followers), a capstan, chain blocks and gear, large crane, stage and winch, two seans (seines nets), tuck net and stop net, and circa 50 tons of French salt.

The headland was popular with tourists during Queen Victoria's reign. The freehold of the Gurnard's Head Inn was put up for sale by auction on 27 May 1880, at the Western Hotel, Penzance. The Inn was part of the Nicholls' Tenement and there was also rights of common on Treen Cliff and 12 acres (4.9 ha) of "fertile arable lands and improvable enclosed Crofts and Moors". The reserve was £975 and the highest bid was £730 and the property was not sold.
