= Treen, Zennor =

Hamlet in Cornwall, England

Coordinates: 50.185°N 5.59°W

Treen: Cornish: Tredhin
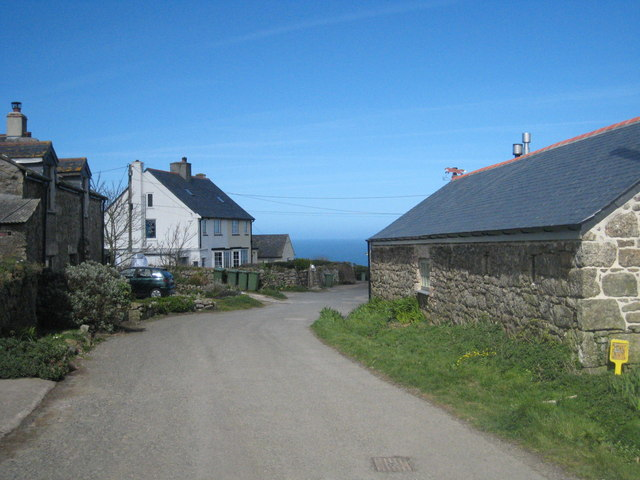

- Location within Cornwall
- OS grid reference: SW4337
- Civil parish: Zennor
- Unitary authority: Cornwall
- Ceremonial county: Cornwall
- Region: South West
- Country: England
- Sovereign state: United Kingdom
- Post town: ST IVES
- Postcode district: TR26
- Dialling code: 01736
- Police: Devon and Cornwall
- Fire: Cornwall
- Ambulance: South Western
- UK Parliament: St Ives

Treen (Cornish: Tredhin) is a hamlet in the parish of Zennor, on the north coast of the Penwith peninsula in Cornwall, England, United Kingdom. It lies along the B3306 road which connects St Ives to the A30 road. At Gurnard's Head nearby on the coast is one of the many cliff castles on the Cornish coast which was formerly a Coastguard Lookout. To the east of Gurnard's Head is Treen Cove. The area is owned by the National Trust.

The Gurnard's Head Hotel is situated on the B3306 and in the 1960s was noted for a totem pole at the front of the building.

It is not to be confused with the larger village of Treen on the south coast of the Penwith peninsula, less than 10 miles away.
