= Dafydd Trefor =

Welsh cleric and poet

Dafydd Trefor (d. 1528?) was a Welsh cleric and bard. He is known to have been born in the parish of Llanddeiniolen, Caernarfonshire. Bangor parish records for 1504 refer to him as rector of Llanygrad (i.e. Llaneugrad-cum-Llanallgo, Anglesey), and as a canon.

His poetic works are in cywydd form, and include four ‘eulogies’ (among them is one to ‘Deiniol Bangor’, i.e. bishop Daniel), eight ‘petitions’ (the one in which a request is made for a concubine and a harp possibly being the best known), three 'elegies' (one on the death of king Henry VII of England), and three religious or philosophical 'cywyddau'.

An elegy written on Dafydd Trefor by Ieuan ap Madoc suggests he died in 1527 or early in 1528.
