= Francis Oats =

Cornish miner and chairman of De Beers

- Francis Oats
- Born: 29 October 1848; Golant, Cornwall, England
- Died: 1 September 1918 (aged 69); Port Elizabeth, Eastern Cape, South Africa
- Occupation: Mine captain
- Known for: Chairman of De Beers diamond company

Francis Oats (29 October 1848 – 1 September 1918) was a Cornish miner who became chairman of De Beers diamond company. He made extensive investments in the Cornish tin mining industry, which collapsed after he had died. He is known for Porthledden, a mansion he built at the tip of Cornwall.

== Early years ==
Francis Oats was born on 29 October 1848, at South Torfrey Farm, Golant, near Fowey, Cornwall, England, in the parish of St Sampson. (Note: Other sources give his place of birth as St Just in Penwith, Cornwall. He grew up in St Just.) His parents were Francis Oats (1794–1871) and Maria Rundle (1810–97). His father was a farmer. His younger sister Maria was born in 1850. The family moved to St Just in Penwith, a mining district, about 1854. Like most young men in the district Oats became a miner when he left school, but every week he would walk to Penzance, seven miles away, to attend evening classes so he could become a mining engineer. At the age of 17, Oats placed second in the mineralogy examination for the British Isles, and obtained a high grade in mining, a subject in which he had not been instructed. He was offered free tuition at the London School of Mines but would have to pay his expenses, and no scholarship was available.

Francis Oats was first appointed Mine Agent in 1871. He was mining captain at Botallack Mine. For a while Oats also gave science classes in the Botallack district. He married Elizabeth Ann Olds on 17 August 1874, in St Just in Penwith, daughter of a butcher. Two of their children died in infancy. Their surviving children were Francis Freathey (b. 1879), Wilfred (b. 1883), Giles (b. 1885) and Marie Elise (b. 1887).

== South Africa ==
=== Government mines inspector ===
On 9 December 1874, Oats was appointed Cape Colony Government Mining Engineer at Kimberley, South Africa, at the age of 26. Oats left for South Africa on a 20-month mission in January 1875. The colony's government had recently passed ordinances in favour of small miners which prevented mine concession owners from imposing excessive rentals on the diggers and shopkeepers, and did not allow an individual or company to hold more than ten claims. The British government had overridden some of these measures. The proprietors continued to accumulate claims and raise rents, causing mounting unrest. Oats, as Provincial Engineer, gave the decisive opinion that "fostering a large number of individual holdings is most adverse to economy of working. Oats made it clear that the restriction on the number of claims would be an obstacle to obtaining foreign capital. He wrote of the 10 claim limit,

The local capitalist knows very well how to evade the law, and it is done over and over again, whilst the claimholder who disposes of his ground suffers an injustice through the ground not realizing as much as it would undoubtedly had the home or foreign capitalist legitimate means of competing for the ground, for no one will be found to invest money in a mine (away from the place) under such a paltry restriction.

Oats resumed his position at Botallack as soon as he returned.

=== Mining executive ===
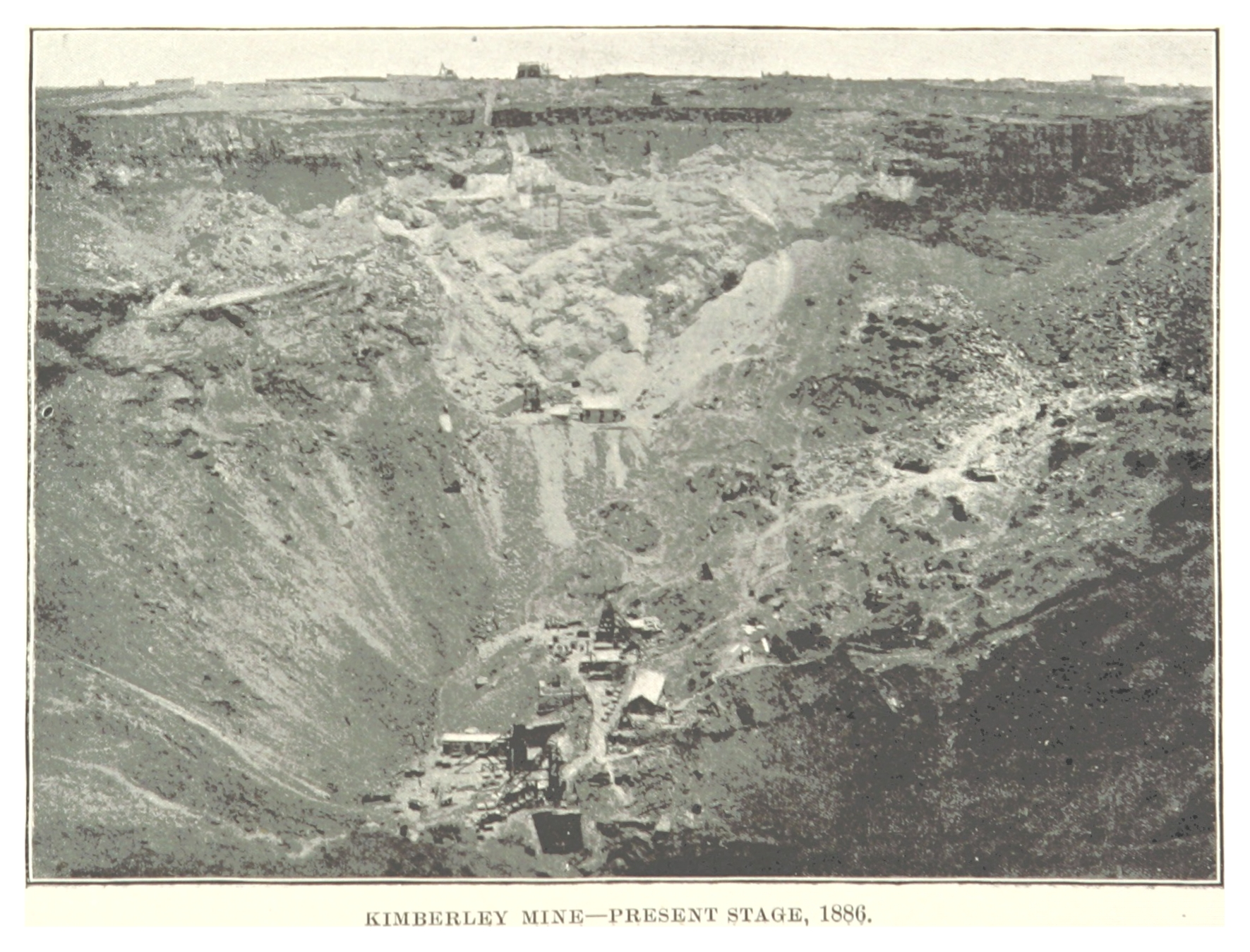
The Big Hole (Kimberley Mine) in 1886

In May 1877 Oats was asked to take a position in Kimberley, which he accepted. The job was to run the Kimberley mines for Baring-Gould and Atkins Co. In 1883, he joined the Victoria Mine company. De Beers Mining, headed by Cecil Rhodes, obtained control of Victoria company in 1887 using financing from Stow and Jules Porges & Co., who began quiet purchases of Victoria shares early in 1887, and obtained most of its share capital for £57,000. On learning this and that the Victoria claims were surrounded by De Beers mergers, Oats and R. Hinrichson, directors of Victoria, agreed to amalgamate in April 1887 in exchange for scrip and stock with nominal value of £445,000 plus other assets. Both Oats and Hinrichson became directors of De Beers.

By the start of 1890, De Beers had an effective monopoly on the South African diamond trade. The poorer mines had been closed and production reduced to push up the price of diamonds. The Wesselton Mine was discovered late in 1890. The De Beers directors were unwilling to buy the mine, but were reluctantly persuaded after Oats had investigated it and described the damage it could do to diamond prices.

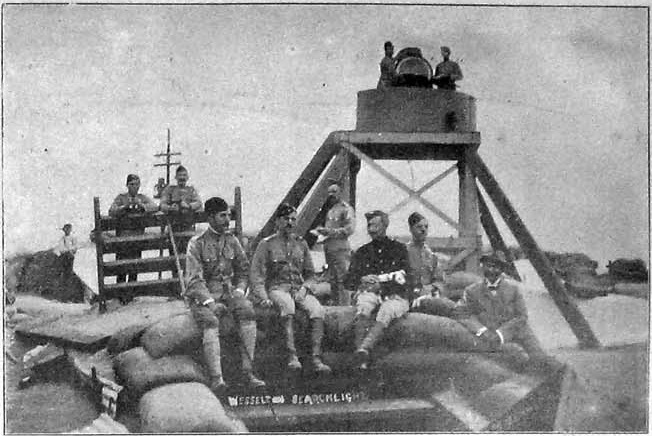
Searchlight at the Wesselton Mine during the Siege of Kimberley (1899)

There were many Cornish miners at Kimberley, particularly as the mines became deeper and their skills in mining hard rock became more important. Oats did his best for these miners. He insisted that De Beers give each miner a yearly paid holiday in Cornwall. He also forced adoption of water hydrants to lay the dust created by mining drills, the main cause of silicosis. He became president of the Cornish Association at Kimberley. Oats was elected to represent Namaqualand in the South African parliament, holding office until 1907. During the Second Boer War in 1899, Oats was a member of the Civilian Defence Force. In 1901, Francis Oats and his son Francis Freathy Oats visited South America.

Oats became known as an authority on diamonds. In December 1906 Oats visited Henri Lemoine in Paris with three others, and saw Lemoine (stark naked to show he had nothing hidden) mix substances in a crucible, heat it in a huge furnace, and produce tiny diamonds. Oats demanded repeats of the experiment, and remained sceptical of some trick, saying the diamonds were too close in colour and shape to those of the Jagersfontein Mine near Kimberley. Lemoine was arrested on charges of fraud on 11 December? 1907. In 1908, a Parisian jeweller said he had sold Lemoine some small, uncut diamonds from the Jagersfontein mine that matched the description of the diamonds Lemoine was supposed to have manufactured. Lemoine fled the country before receiving judgement.

=== Chairman of De Beers ===
In 1908, Oats was appointed chairman of De Beers. That year he told the company's annual general meeting, "Really, if one could believe all the stories which have been circulating about the discovery of new mines and methods for the artificial making of diamonds, it would be a marvel that people are willing to buy diamonds at all. ... There have been numerous discoveries of alleged mines in all parts of the world, but none of them have come to the serious production stage except German S.W. Africa where a discovery has been made of some superficial deposits of diamonds, but fortunately for our prices, these, singularly enough, are all small in size." Oats was making a serious error in discounting the German discovery, which had large and high quality diamonds, and dismissing Ernest Oppenheimer's Premier Mine, which was producing more than the total output of De Beers.

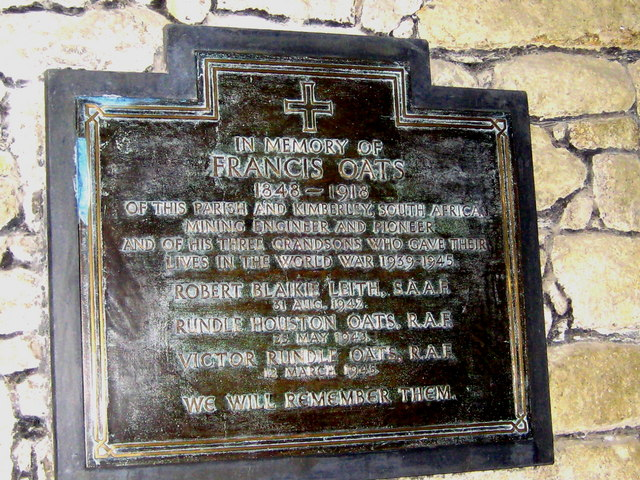
Memorial in St Just church to Francis Oats and to his three grandsons who died in World War II (1939–45)

The Kimberley diamond mines were shut down on 8 August 1914, soon after the start of World War I (1914–18). Francis Oats said the 1,000 men employed at the mines would be given half pay until the end of January 1915, when the company would decide what to do next. He said of the closure,

Today we are onlookers at the greatest crisis the world has ever known. As to how long that crisis may continue we can have no foreknowledge. I have to tell you, however, that since the declaration of war we have sold no diamonds at all. We have to recognise that we are a company producing a luxury, which naturally does not find a sale in circumstances like those that we face today. We are perforce compelled to mark time. We have faith that things will eventually right themselves, and that our product will again be in demand. But today we have to face the fact that no demand exists. We have therefore to ask ourselves, shall we go on working without selling diamonds? I need scarcely tell you that the position has been very anxiously discussed. There have been differences of opinion among the Directors but in the end we came to the conclusion that while this state of things lasted we must as far as possible confine ourselves to marking time, and not further increase the stock of unsold diamonds already on hand.

In May 1916, the Wesselton Mine and Bultfontein Mine were reopened, but the Big Hole had closed for good. Francis Oats died on 1 September 1918, in Port Elizabeth, Eastern Cape, South Africa. He was survived by his widow, daughter and three sons. The Francis Oats House, a hostel for pupils at the Kimberley Boys' High School, was built in 1920 and was still in use in 2016.

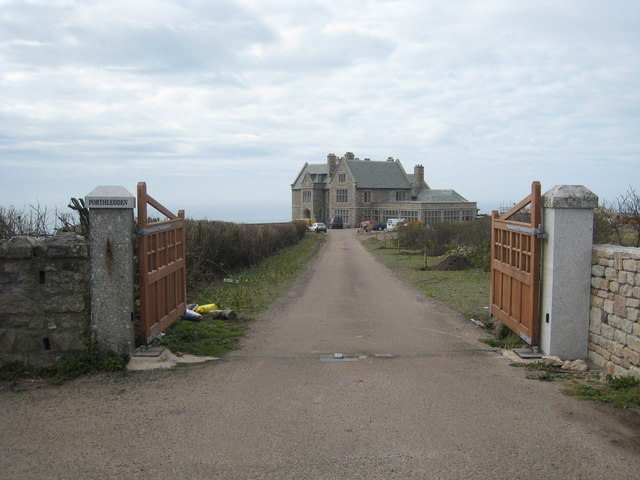
Porthledden House, which Oats built in Cape Cornwall

== Cornish investments ==
On a visit back to Cornwall, Oats bought shares in the Levant Mine. He also took shareholdings in the Cape Cornwall and Kenidjack mines. At the time of his death he was chairman of Basset Mines of Redruth. He tried to modernise the tin mine at St Just by sinking a new vertical shaft so that ore could be raised direct from the lower levels to the surface, a project that seemed even then to be uneconomical. His large investments in mining in Cornwall were misguided, since the industry would collapse after his death.

Oats arranged for construction of Porthledden, a 21-bedroom mansion in Cape Cornwall designed as a gentleman's residence that was completed in 1909. He does not seem to have spent much time there, perhaps due to the length of the journey from South Africa. The terraces of the garden are above the north side of Priest's Cove at Cape Cornwall. On the south side of the cove there are adits cut into the cliff for the St Just Mine. His son made Porthledden into a hotel, but it did not succeed. It was sold in the 1950s to pay off family debts, and later fell into disrepair.

== Sources ==
- Bolitho, Bob (11 September 1918), "Death of Mr. F. Oats of St Just", The Cornishman, archived from the original on 13 July 2014
- Brooke, Justin (September 2004). "The Oxford Dictionary of National Biography". Oats, Francis (1848–1918), mining engineer and authority on diamonds. Oxford Dictionary of National Biography (online ed.). Oxford University Press. pp. ref:odnb/47736. doi:10.1093/ref:odnb/47736. (Subscription, Wikipedia Library access or UK public library membership required.)
- Christie, Phillip John (23 February 2015), "Francis Oats", geni.com
- Davenport-Hines, R.P.T. (28 June 2005), Speculators and Patriots: Essays in Business Biography, Routledge, ISBN 978-1-135-77933-7
- Epstein, Edward Jay (10 May 2011), "15: Infringements", The Rise and Fall of Diamonds
- Farrell-Robert, Janine (1 April 2007), Glitter & Greed: The Secret World of the Diamond Cartel, Red Wheel Weiser, ISBN 978-1-60925-880-1
- Francis Oats House, Kimberley Boys' High School, archived from the original on 20 September 2016
- Howes, Oliver (2014), "Priest's Cove at Cape Cornwall – A Feature", Oliver's Cornwall
- Keane, Patrick (October 1974), "Adult Education and the Cornish Miner: A Study in Victorian Initiative", British Journal of Educational Studies, 22 (3), Taylor & Francis, Ltd. on behalf of the Society for Educational Studies: 261–291, doi:10.2307/3120060, JSTOR 3120060
- Kiewiet, Cornelius William De (1937), The Imperial Factor in South Africa: A Study in Politics and Economics, CUP Archive, GGKEY:5TL8CHER2JK
- Lunderstedt, Steve (8 August 2016), "8 August 1914, The De Beers mines close down", Today in Kimberley's History, City of Kimberley
- Newbury, Colin (Spring 1987), "Technology, Capital, and Consolidation: The Performance of De Beers Mining Company Limited, 1880–1889", The Business History Review, 61 (1), The President and Fellows of Harvard College: 1–42, doi:10.2307/3115773, JSTOR 3115773, S2CID 154919072
- Payton, Philip (2005), The Cornish Overseas: A History of Cornwall's 'great Emigration', Dundurn, ISBN 978-1-904880-04-2
- "Porthledden", Inside Out, BBC
- "Porthledden: Built by Captain Francis Oats; Chairman of De Beers", Portledden
- Symes, Bob, Francis Oats, Mark Hattam
- Trevelyan, Raleigh (13 March 2012), Grand Dukes and Diamonds: The Wernhers of Luton Hoo, Faber & Faber, ISBN 978-0-571-29030-7
- Turrell, Rob (April 1981), "The 1875 Black Flag Revolt on the Kimberley Diamond Fields", Journal of Southern African Studies, 7 (2), Taylor & Francis, Ltd.: 194–235, doi:10.1080/03057078108708026, JSTOR 2636378
- "Unsung mining hero's life celebrated in book", West Briton, 10 June 2009
