= Cape Cornwall Mine =

Tin mine in Cornwall, England

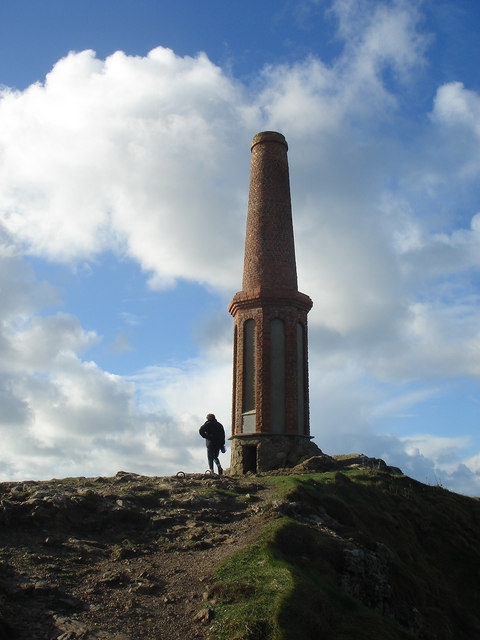
- The 1864 chimney of Cape Cornwall Mine

- Cape Cornwall Mine within Cornwall

Location
- Location: St Just in Penwith, United Kingdom; 50°07′37″N 5°42′33″W

Production
- Products: Tin

History
- Active: 1838–1849, 1864–1875, 1879–1883

Owner

UNESCO World Heritage Site
- Type: Cultural
- Criteria: ii, iii, iv
- Designated: 2006 (30th session)
- Reference no.: 1512
- Region: Europe and North America

Cape Cornwall Mine was a tin mine on Cape Cornwall, a cape at the western tip of Cornwall, England, United Kingdom. It operated intermittently between 1838 and 1883, after which time it closed permanently and the engine house was demolished. The mine's 1864 chimney near the peak of the cape was retained as an aid to navigation, and in the early 20th century the former ore dressing floors were for a time converted into greenhouses and wineries. In 1987 the site was donated to the nation by the H. J. Heinz Company. The remains of Cape Cornwall Mine now form part of the Cornwall and West Devon Mining Landscape, a UNESCO World Heritage Site.

== History ==
Cape Cornwall Mine opened in 1838 during the Cornish mining boom. The mine was sited on Cape Cornwall itself at the western extremity of Great Britain, 1.2 miles (1.9 km) west of the town of St Just. The small and relatively unremarkable mine closed in 1849.

In 1864 the mine was reopened under the ownership of St Just Consolidated Mines, and an engine house with an elaborate chimney was built near the peak of the cape to serve the boiler of the mine's whim (a machine for raising ore to the surface). The engine house and its associated boiler house were built near the foot of the hill and connected to the chimney stack by a long stone flue. With surrounding steep cliffs limiting the space for ore dressing, "spalling braces" (platforms attached to the shaft) were fitted to house spalling (breaking the ore into chunks for sorting) operations. In 1869 St Just Consolidated Mines abandoned the Cape Cornwall Mine, although it continued to operate independently until 1875.

In 1879 the mine was once more reopened, this time under the ownership of St Just United. The chimney draught of the 1864 chimney was causing problems, and in 1880 the chimney was abandoned and replaced with a new chimney stack further downhill. The 1864 chimney stack was considered a valuable navigational aid, and was not demolished.

By this time the Cornish mining industry was in sharp decline, as the Metalliferous Mines Regulation Act 1872 (35 & 36 Vict. c. 77) and the Factory and Workshop Act 1878 drastically limited the use of the cheap female and child labour on which the industry depended. (Note: Unlike the better-known coal mines of Wales and northern England, in the metal mines of Cornwall and Devon women and children worked only at surface level. Consequently, they had not been affected by the Mines and Collieries Act 1842, which banned women and children from working underground.) In 1883 the mine was permanently abandoned, and shortly afterwards the engine house was demolished.

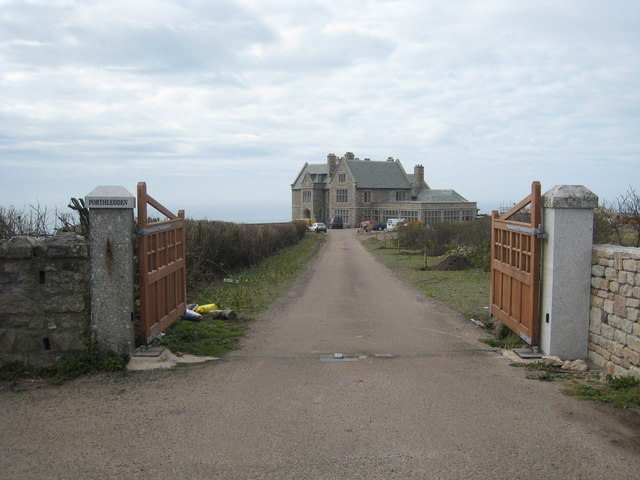
Porthledden House

In 1907 De Beers chairman Francis Oats built Porthledden House, a 11,660 square feet (1,083 m^{2}) country house modelled on Groote Schuur, at Cape Cornwall. The ore sorting floors were converted into greenhouses and wineries, while the surrounding cliffs were planted with mesembryanthemum beds.

== Public ownership and World Heritage status ==
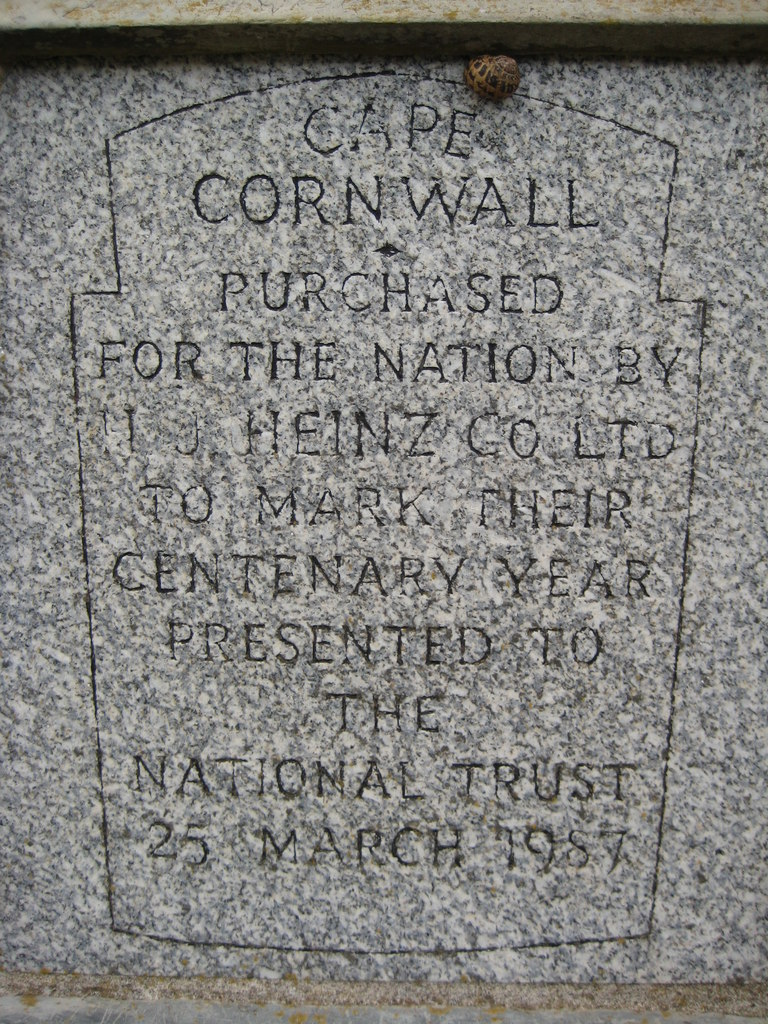
Inscription on the 1864 chimney

In 1987 Cape Cornwall was purchased for the nation by the H. J. Heinz Company, to commemorate a century of the company's operations in the United Kingdom. Other than Porthledden House, which remains in private ownership, the mine site is now owned and maintained by the National Trust. Heinz's donation is commemorated by a Heinz Baked Beanz label-shaped plaque set into the base of the 1864 chimney. The remains of the mine are included within the Cornwall and West Devon Mining Landscape, a World Heritage Site since 2006.

== See also ==
- Mining in Cornwall and Devon

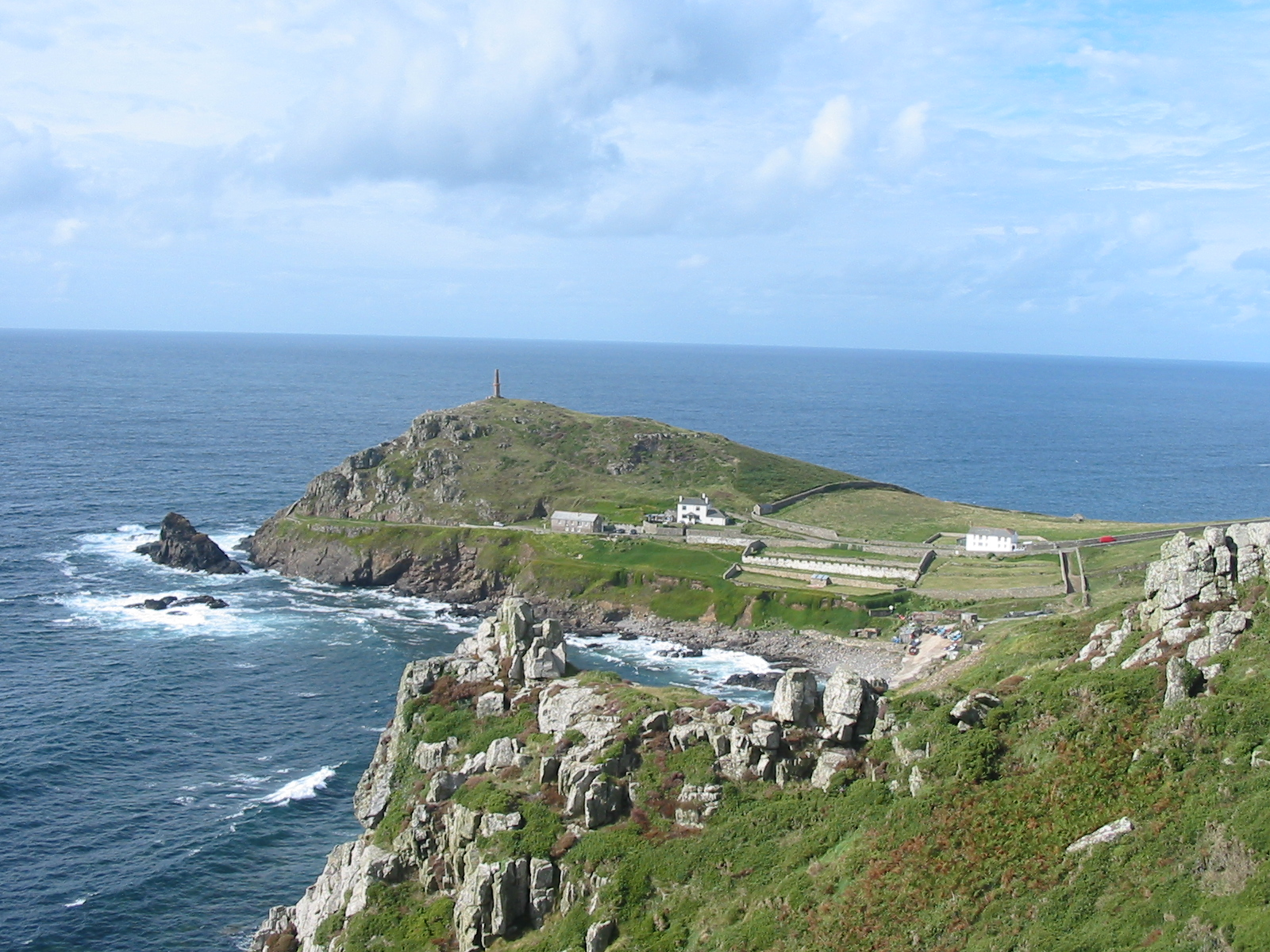
The remaining structures of Cape Cornwall Mine, on and around the steep hill of Cape Cornwall. The white building near the centre of the photograph was formerly the mine's counting house, and the long low building beside it is the former boiler house. The extensive walled structures to the east (right) of the mine buildings are the former ore sorting floors, which housed wineries and greenhouses in the early 20th century.

== Notes, references and external links ==
=== Bibliography ===
- Cornish, Joe; Noton, David; Wakefield, Paul (2006). Coast. London: National Trust. ISBN 978-1-905400-38-6. OCLC 65470150.
- Gamble, Barry (2011). Cornish Mines: St Just to Redruth. Penzance: Alison Hodge. ISBN 978-0-906720-81-3. OCLC 710018381.
- Joseph, Peter (2006), British Mining No 79 – Cape Cornwall Mine, Northern Mine Research Society. ISBN 978-0-901450-60-9
- Kent, Michael; Kent, Merryn (2008). Cornwall and the Coast Path. Penzance: Alison Hodge. ISBN 978-0-906720-68-4. OCLC 226975230.
- Mayers, Lynne (2008a). A Dangerous Place to Work! Women & Children of the Devon & Cornwall Mining Industries 1300 to 1970. Cinderford: Blaize Bailey Books. ISBN 978-0-9556896-0-4. OCLC 688362135.
- Mayers, Lynne (2008b). Bal Maidens: Women and Girls of the Cornwall and Devon Mines (2nd ed.). Cinderford: Blaize Bailey Books. ISBN 978-0-9556896-1-1. OCLC 663435621. (1st edition published 2004 by The Hypatia Trust, Penzance as Balmaidens)
- Smelt, Maurice (2006). 101 Cornish Lives. Penzance: Alison Hodge. ISBN 978-0-906720-50-9. OCLC 85020110.
