= Joe Cornish (disambiguation) =

Jo(e) or Joseph Cornish may refer to:

- Joe Cornish (born 1968), English comedian, broadcaster and film director
- Joe Cornish (photographer) (born 1958), English landscape photographer
- Jo Cornish, Australian newsreader
- Joseph Cornish, American politician
