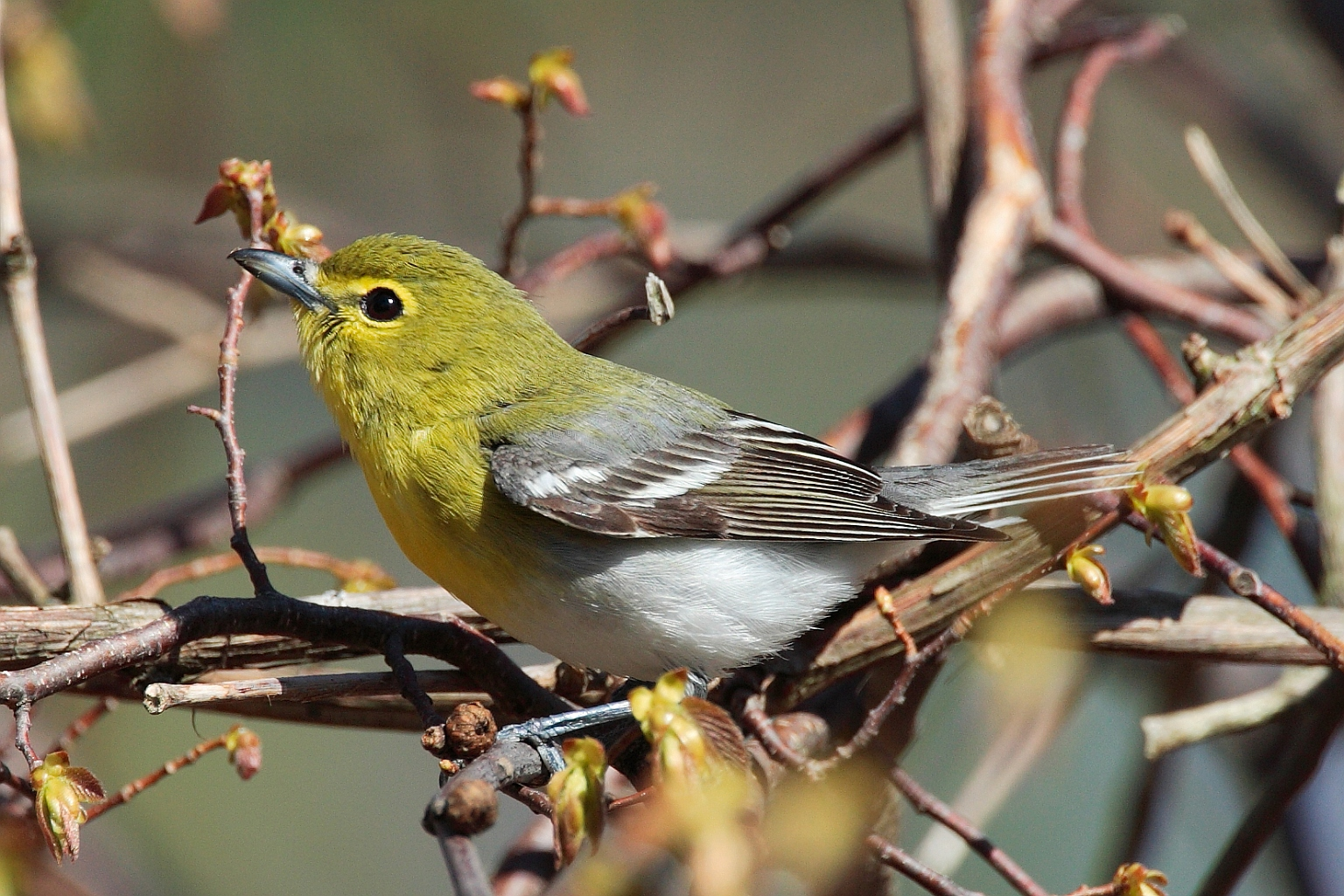
- Adult

Conservation status
- Least Concern (IUCN 3.1)

Scientific classification
- Kingdom: Animalia
- Phylum: Chordata
- Class: Aves
- Order: Passeriformes
- Family: Vireonidae
- Genus: Vireo
- Species: V. flavifrons

Binomial name
- Vireo flavifrons Vieillot, 1808
- Range

Audio
- Song

= Yellow-throated vireo =

Species of bird

The yellow-throated vireo (Vireo flavifrons) is a small American songbird.

== Etymology ==
The generic name Vireo is a Latin word referring to a green migratory bird, perhaps the female golden oriole, or possibly the European greenfinch. The specific name flavifrons is from the Latin words flavus, "yellow", and frons, "forehead".

== Description ==
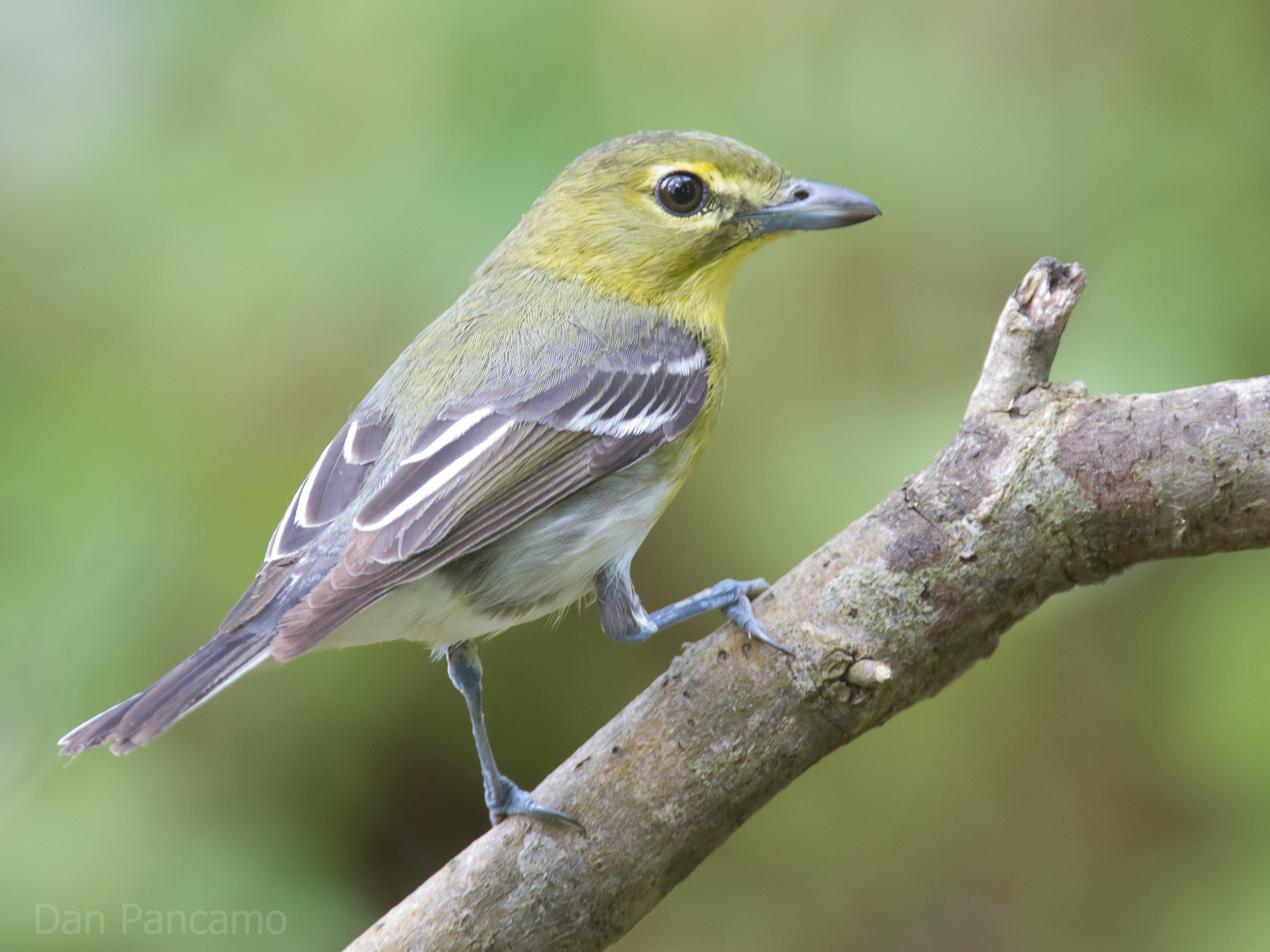
Yellow-throated vireo, Galveston, Texas

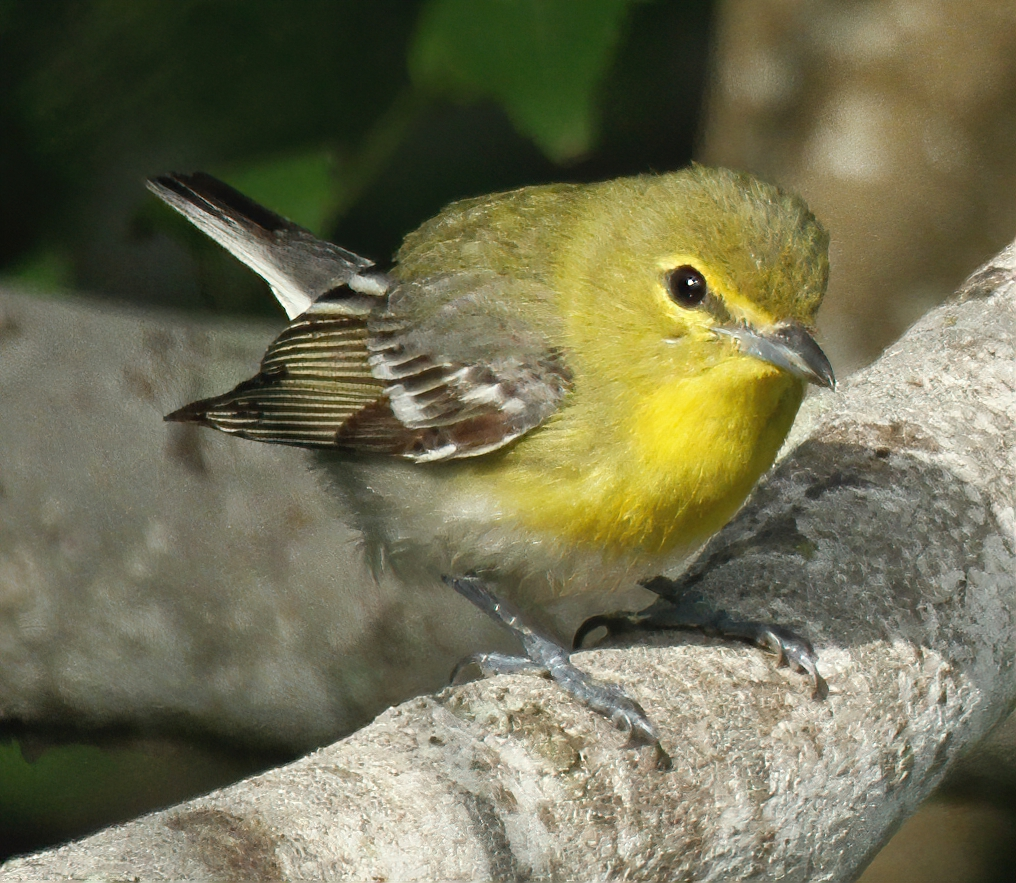
South Padre Island, Texas

Adults are mainly olive on the head and upperparts with a yellow throat and white belly; they have dark eyes with yellow "spectacles". The tail and wings are dark with white wing bars. They have thick blue-grey legs and a stout bill.

Measurements:

- Length: 5.1–5.9 in (13–15 cm)
- Weight: 0.5–0.7 oz (15–21 g)
- Wingspan: 9.1 in (23 cm)

== Habitat and distribution ==
Their breeding habitat is open deciduous woods in southern Canada and the eastern United States.

These birds migrate to the deep southern United States, Mexico, the Caribbean, and Central America. They are very rare vagrants to western Europe; a September 1990 sighting from Kenidjack Valley in Cornwall, Great Britain, and September 1998 from Heligoland, a small German archipelago in the German Bight have been reported. The most recent occurrence in Europe was in October 2026, near the Írafoss Hydroelectric power plant in Iceland.

== Diet and behaviour ==
They forage for insects high in trees. They also eat berries, especially before migration and in winter, when they are occasionally seen feeding on gumbo-limbo (Bursera simaruba) fruit. They make a thick, cup-like nest attached to a fork in a tree branch.
