= Boswedden Mine =

Remains of a mine in St Just, Cornwall, England

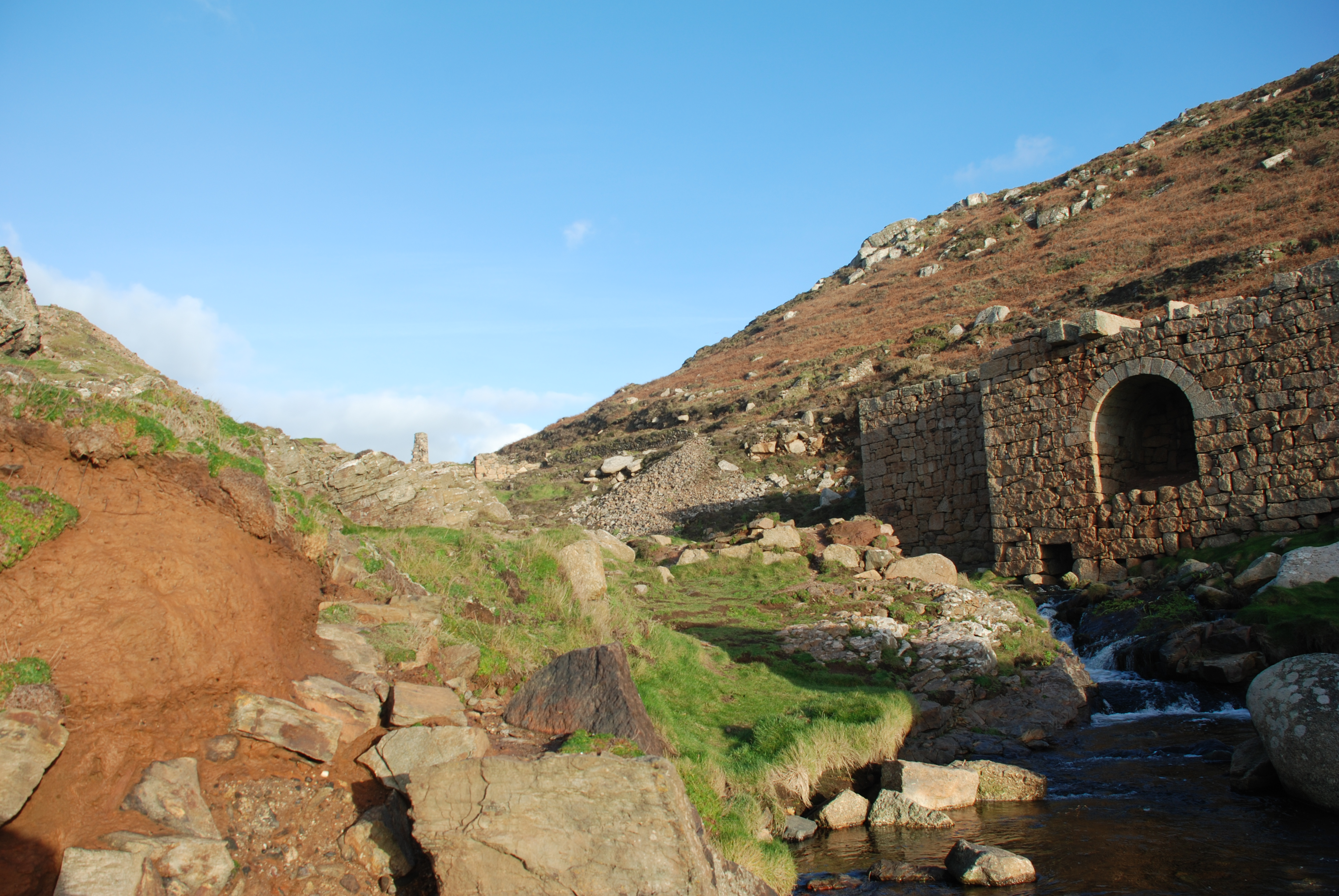
Wheel house at Boswedden mine

The remains of Boswedden Mine ("Wheal Call" meaning work or mine) are located at the bottom of Kenidjack Valley near the town of St Just in West Penwith, Cornwall.

The wheel house originally had the largest wheel in Cornwall measuring 65 feet in diameter.
