= Priest Cove =

Cove in Cornwall, England

Coordinates: 50.125°N 5.706°W

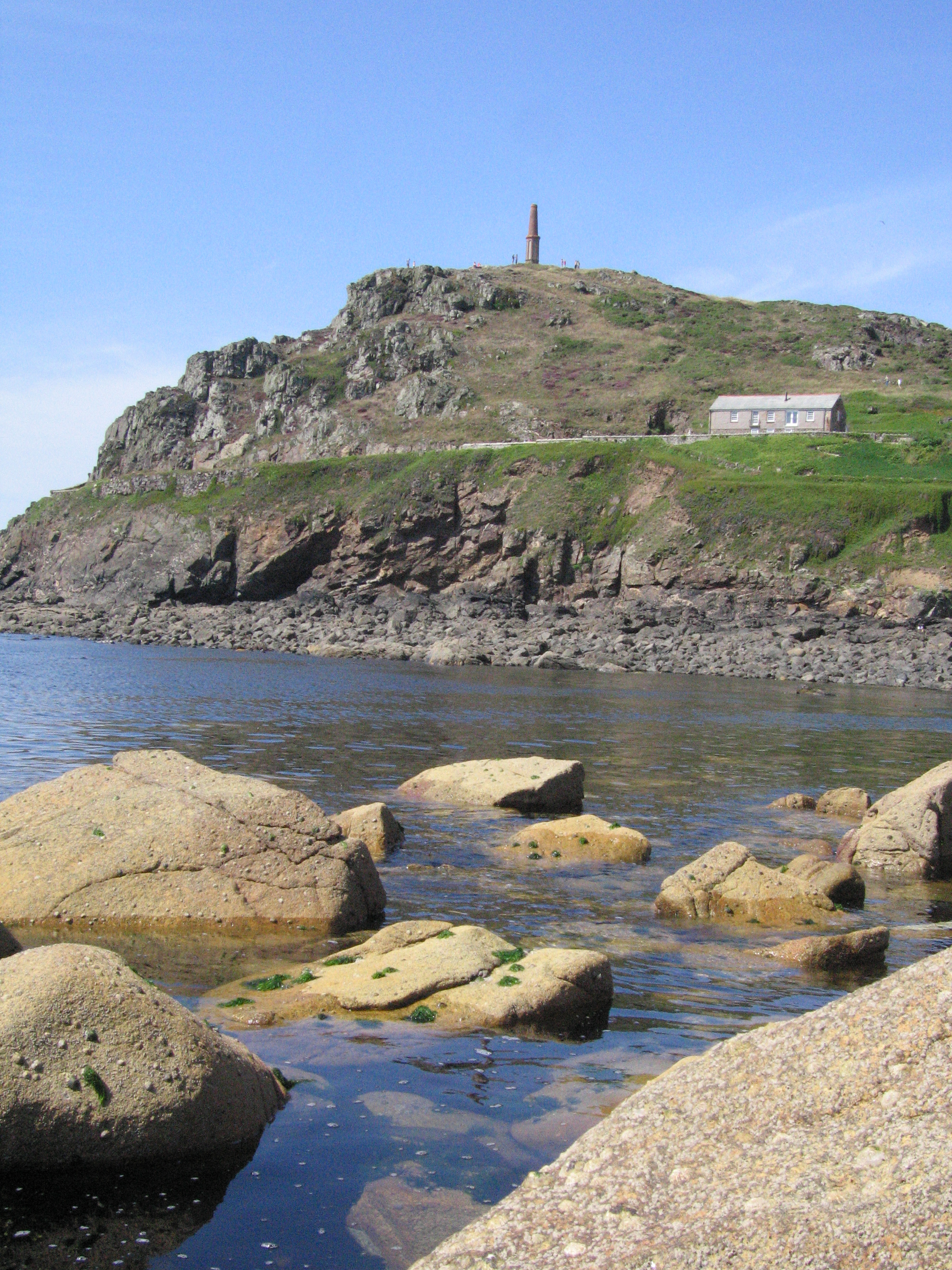
Priest's Cove, Penwith with Cape Cornwall in the background

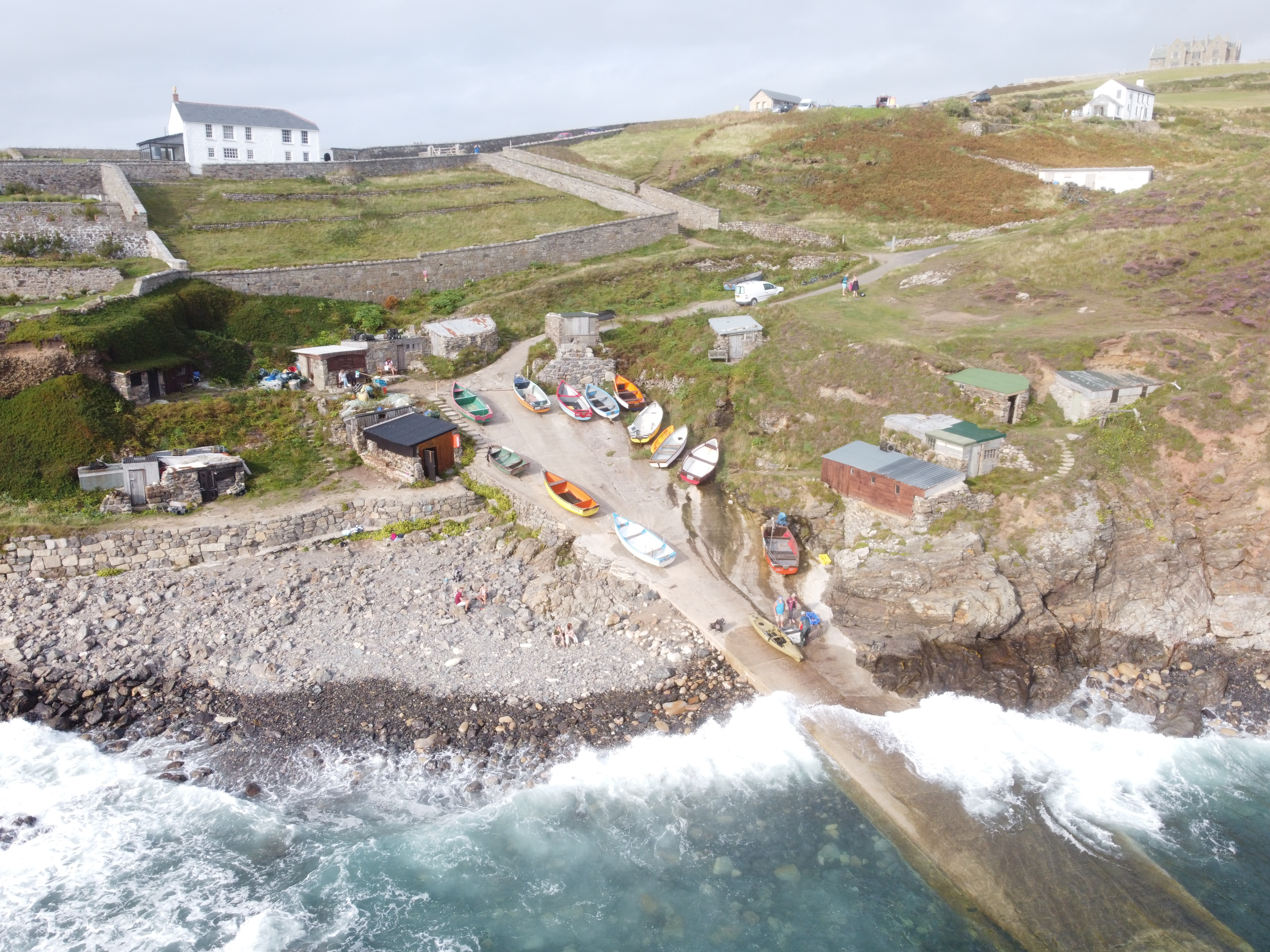
Priest's Cove from the air

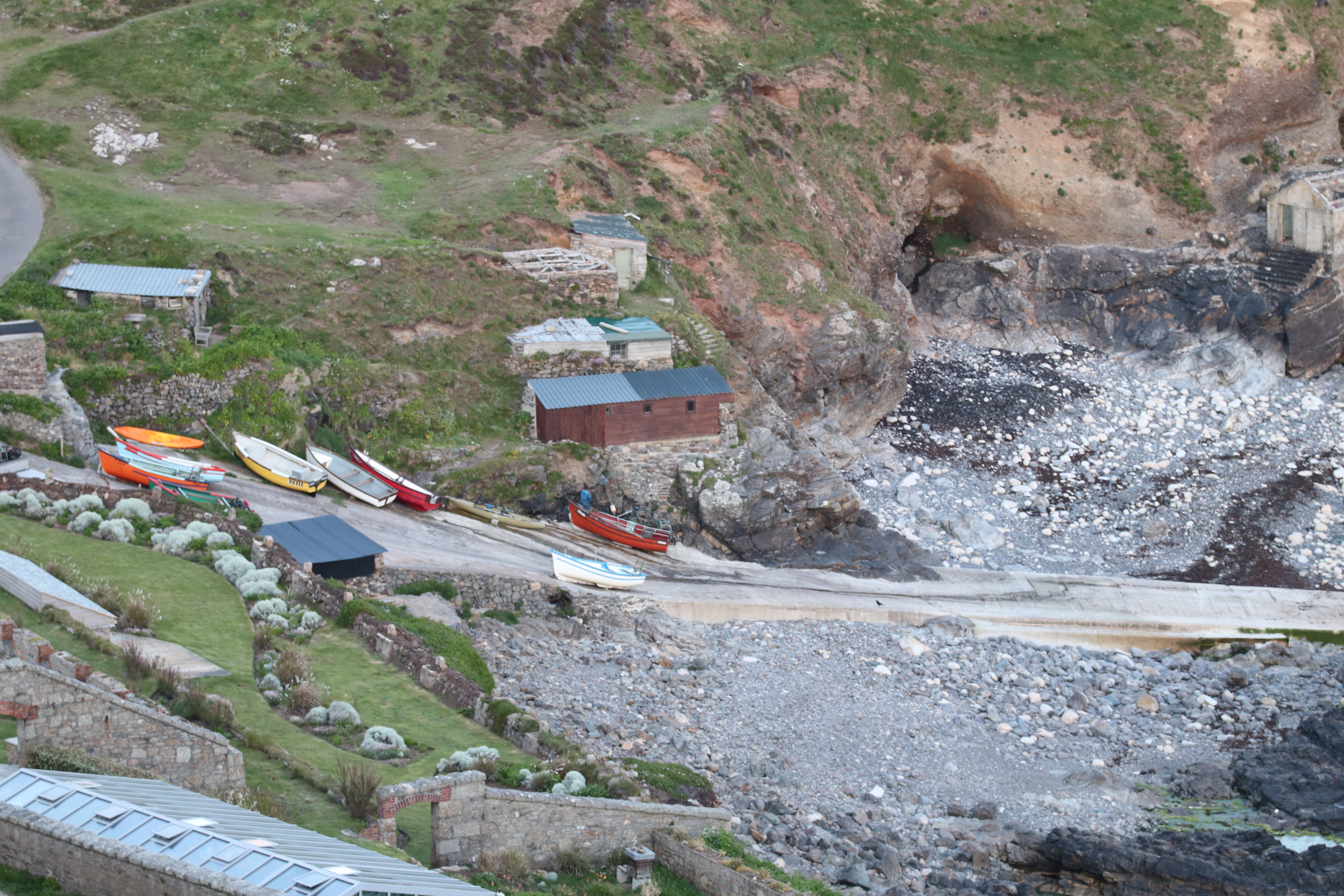
Priests Cove, Cornwall

Priest Cove (Cornish: Porth Ust, meaning St Just's Cove) or Priest's Cove is a small cove one mile (1.6 km) west of St Just, Cornwall, UK. The name is from the Cornish Porth Ust, the port or cove of St Just, which was shortened to Por’ Ust. The apostrophised name "Priest’s" is a spelling mistake and the site has no connection with the clergy.

== Geography ==
The cove lies next to Cape Cornwall which was also linked to St Just, being called Kilgoodh Ust, meaning goose-back of St Just, in the Cornish language. The cove and surrounding area are designated as part of the Aire Point To Carrick Du Site of Special Scientific Interest (SSSI). The South West Coast Path, which follows the coast of south west England from Somerset to Dorset passes by on the cliffs above the cove.

== Fishery ==
In around 1830, cellars were erected for the purpose of establishing a pilchard fishery. The speculation was abandoned owing to the exposed coast. A small fishing fleet is based at Priests Cove, and for example, pollack (Pollachius pollachius) were landed in December 1879.

== Recreation ==
Approximately 1 mile (1.6 km) out to sea are the Brisons, a pair of small islands to which an annual swim is held. In 1881 the Cape Cornwall Regatta was held in the cove. There were five races; 15 feet (4.6 m) and 24 feet (7.3 m) boats had to race the course over two rounds and 13 feet (4.0 m) just the once. The cliffs were lined with a large crowd of spectators.
