= David Noton =

English landscape and travel photographer (born 1957)

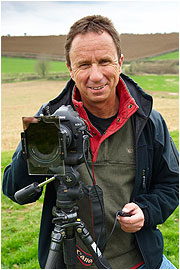
David Noton, April 2009

David Noton is a landscape and travel photographer with over 24 years experience as a professional. During his photographic career, Noton has travelled to just about every corner of the globe, with the exception of Antarctica.

== Biography ==
Born in Bedfordshire in 1957, David started exploring the world at a young age, moving to the USA while his father worked on the American space programme.

After setting up his photography business in Bristol in 1985, Noton undertook work for local design groups, PR consultancies and advertising agencies in the region.

He has won awards in Wildlife Photographer of the Year in 1985, 1989 and 1990.

== Books, DVDs and exhibitions ==
In 2007–08 he wrote his first book Waiting for the Light and his DVD Chasing the Light. The book launched at a four-week exhibition at London’s OXO Gallery, which attracted over 27,000 visitors. In 2012 David launched an iPad app, "Photography in the Raw" on iTunes

=== Bibliography ===
  - 1998 Countryside with Joe Cornish and Paul Wakefield (National Trust Books)

== Contributions to publications ==
David’s pictures are published all over the world and he writes for media including photographic magazines and websites. After a seven-year run with Practical Photography magazine, David is a contributor to Outdoor Photography, Digital Photo Pro and www.photographyblog.com where he has a monthly online column.

== Workshops ==
He has run talks, workshops and shows.
