= Kenidjack Valley =

Valley in Cornwall, United Kingdom

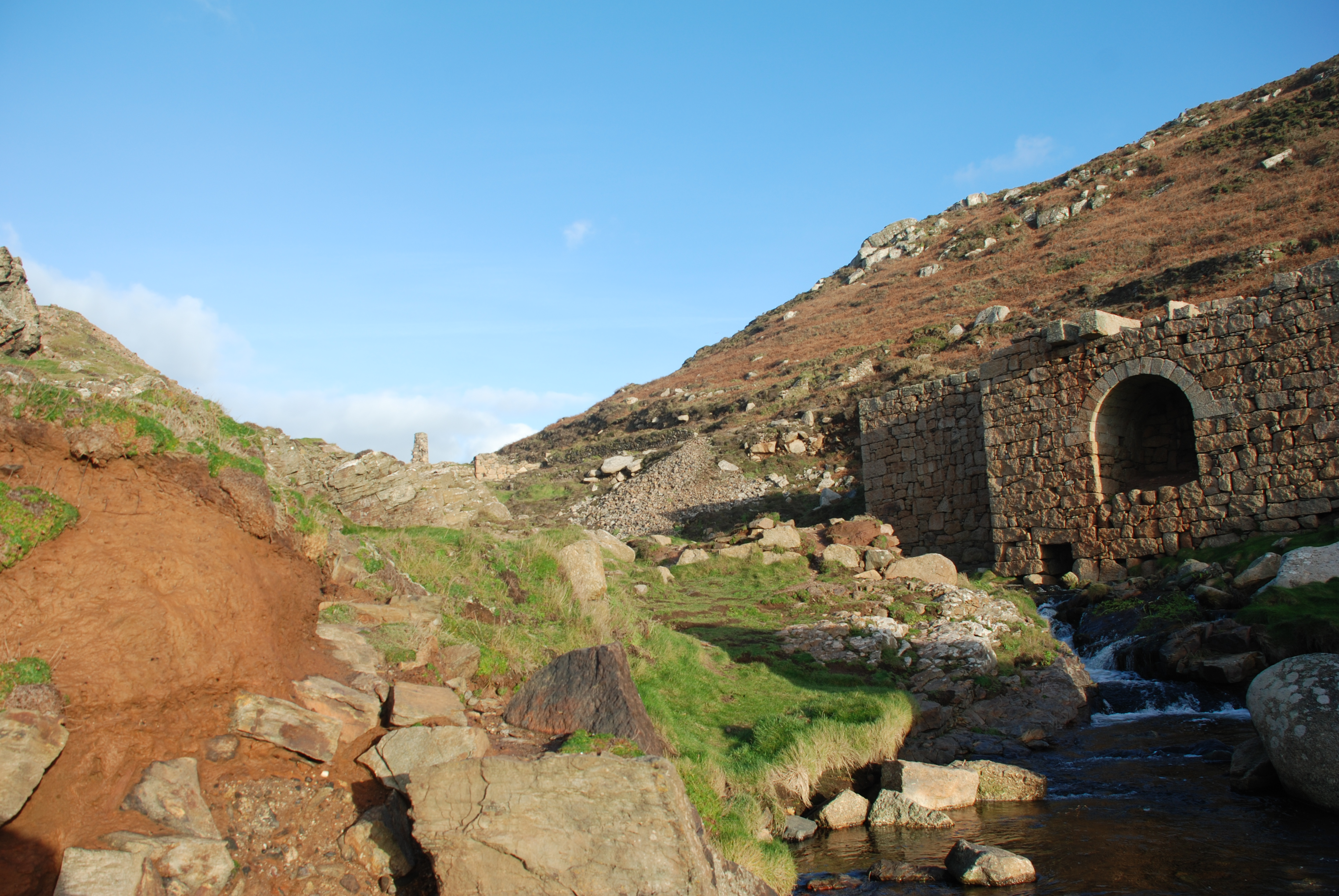
Wheel house at Boswedden mine

Kenidjack Valley (Cornish: Keunyjek, meaning place abounding in firewood), sometimes referred to as Nancherrow Valley (Cornish: Nanj Erow, meaning acre valley), is a steep-sided valley in Cornwall, United Kingdom.

The Tregeseal River flows down the valley and discharges into the Atlantic a few hundred yards north of Cape Cornwall 50.130°N 5.703°W, half-a-mile north-east of the village of St Just.

The valley was an important area of tin mining and the remains of Wheal Owles, Wheal Castle, Boswedden Mine and the Kenidjack arsenic works are still visible. The shallow adit from the Wheal Boys lode to the valley probably dates before 1670. Gunpowder, for blasting mines in Cornwall, was introduced to Cornwall shortly after 1670, and the shallow adit does not show any evidence of blasting.

Today, the valley is popular for hiking and birdwatching.
