= Brisons =

Islet off Cornwall, UK

The Brisons Enys Tonndarth (Cornish)
- Islet
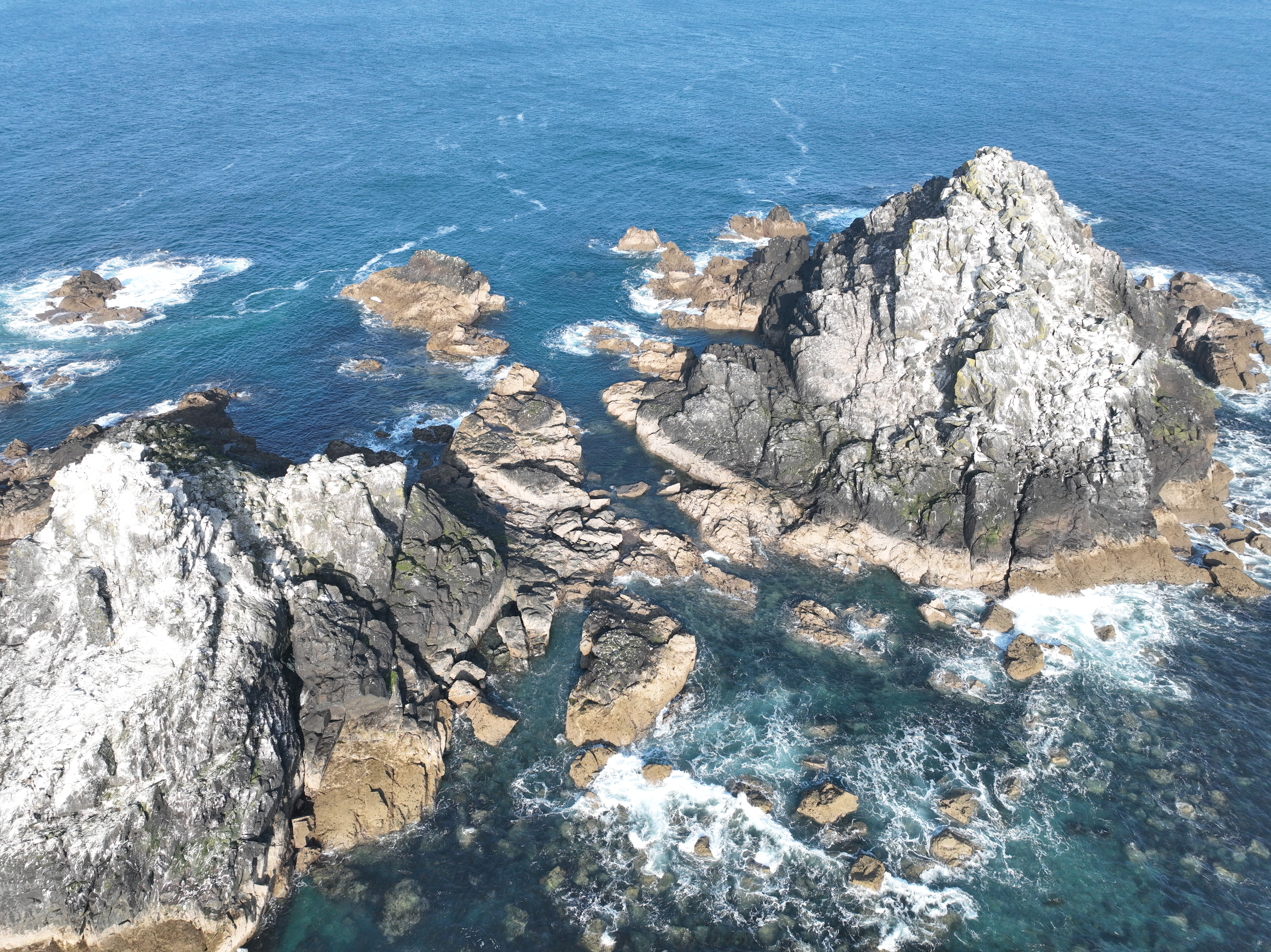
- The Brisons from above

- Location within Cornwall
- Coordinates: 50.12039°N 5.72229°W
- Location: Cornwall, UK

The Brisons (Cornish: Enys Tonndarth meaning island of exploding waves, French: Brisant, the present participle of briser meaning 'shoal of rocks' or literally 'breaker') is a twin-peaked islet in the Celtic Sea situated 1 mile (1.6 km) offshore from Cape Cornwall in Cornwall, on the south-western coast of Great Britain.

== Geography ==
The Brisons (the name is French: brisant, 'reef, breaker') are 22 m (72 ft) and 27 m (89 ft) high and are said to resemble General Charles de Gaulle lying on his back ("General de Gaulle in his bath"). The rocks are connected to Gribba Point (Cornish: Pen an Gribow, meaning head of the reefs) by the Guthen Gwidden reef (Cornish: Kudhen Gwydn, meaning white hidden one). The gap in the reef is called the Adgiwar Gap (Cornish: Aja Wer, meaning green gap). In 1878, an article in the Cornishman newspaper names the reef between the ″Brissons″ and the land as Bridges, and the reef had three gaps; the nearest known as Rose-an-pons.

== Wildlife and ecology ==
In 2016 the rocks were visited by the West Cornwall Ringing Group where they heard at least two European storm petrel (Hydrobates pelagicus) calling; an indication of breeding on the only known site in Cornwall. Sixty-six birds were ringed:

- European shag (Phalacrocorax aristotelis) – 42 including two adults
- razorbill (Alca torda) – 13 including seven adults
- guillemot (Uria aalge) – 11 including eight adults.

== History ==
In 1851, the 250 ton brig New Commercial was wrecked, striking the ledge between the Great and Little Brisons. A dramatic rescue of the surviving crew was attempted, resulting in the death of all but two of the members. As a result, the National Institution for the Preservation of Life from Shipwreck (later the RNLI) established a lifeboat in Sennen Cove in 1853, where one is still based today.

== Recreation ==
During "Cape sports" an annual water sports event based on the beach at Cape Cornwall, swimming races are conducted from the Brisons back to the beach.

== Gallery ==
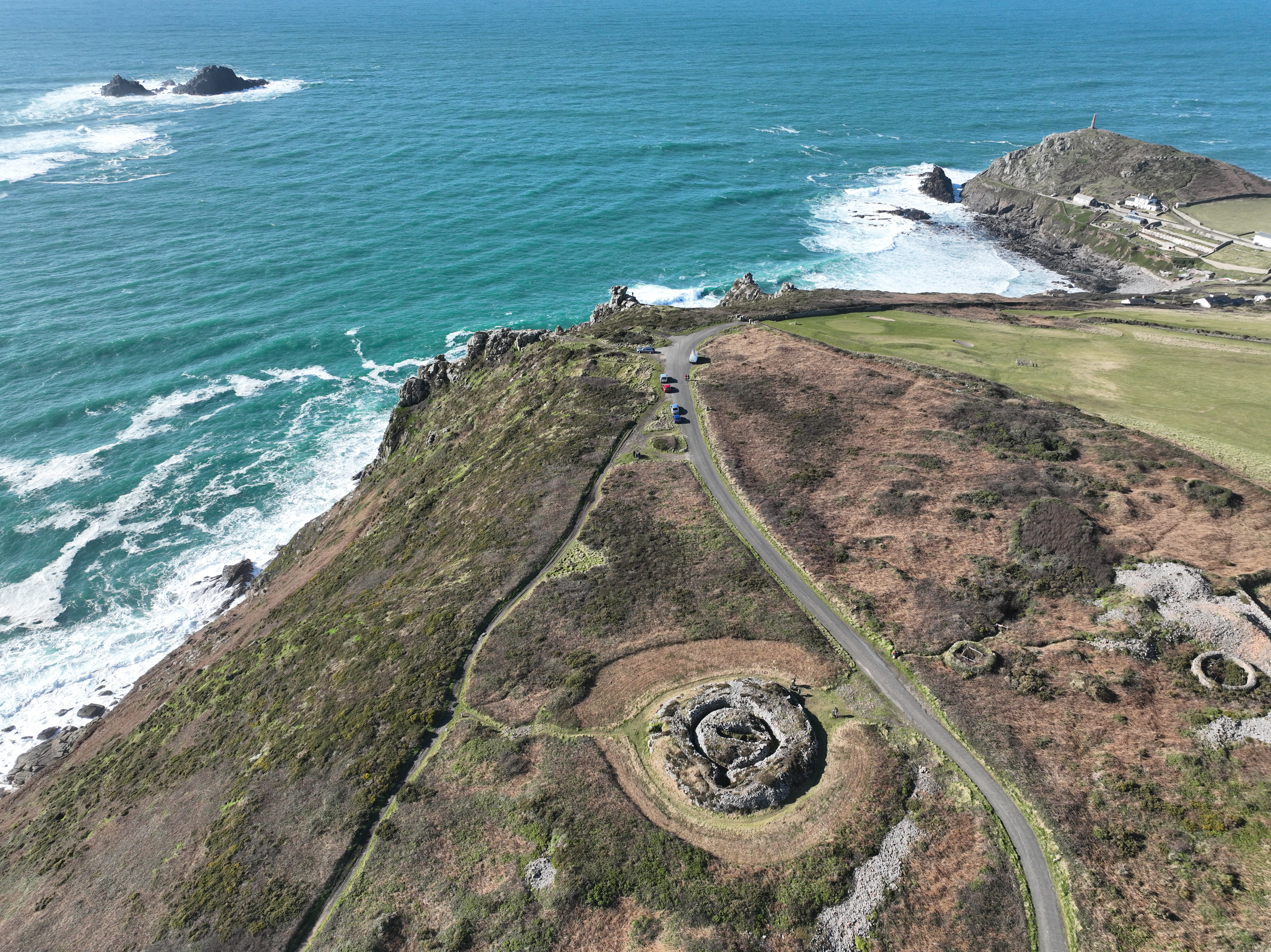
Bollowal Barrow, Cape Cornwall and the Brisons

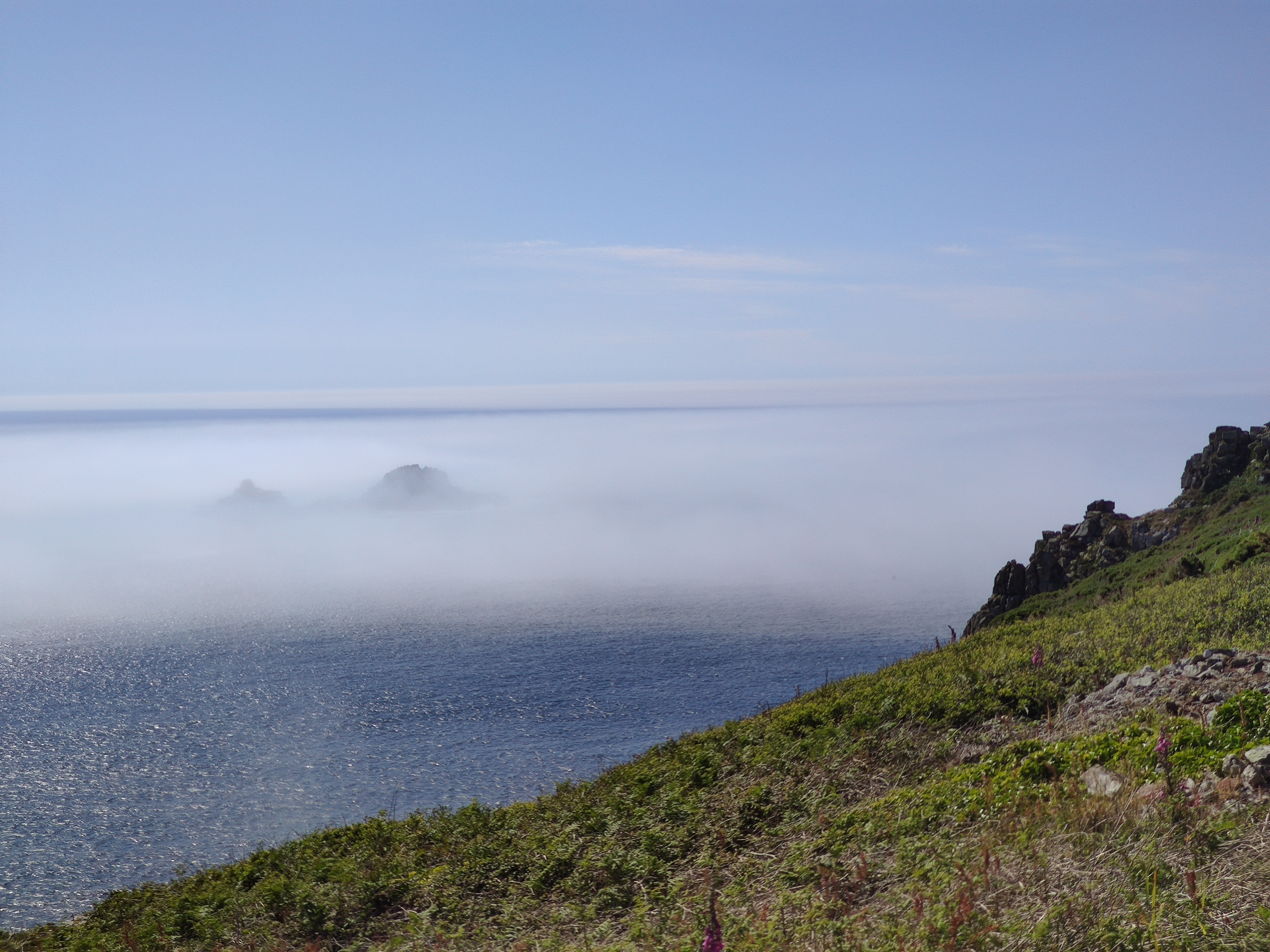
The Brisons in the mist Cornwall

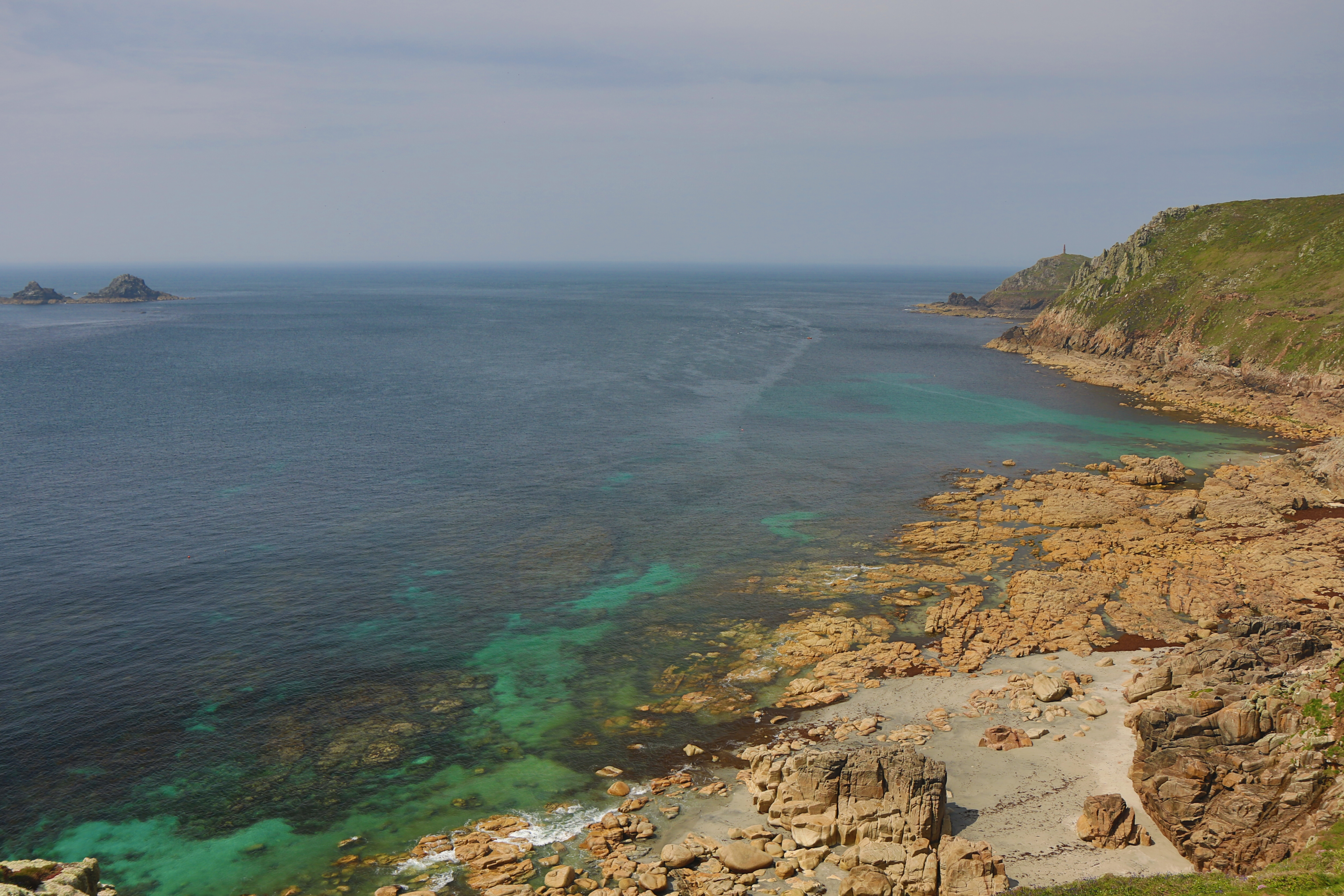
The Brisons and Cape Cornwall

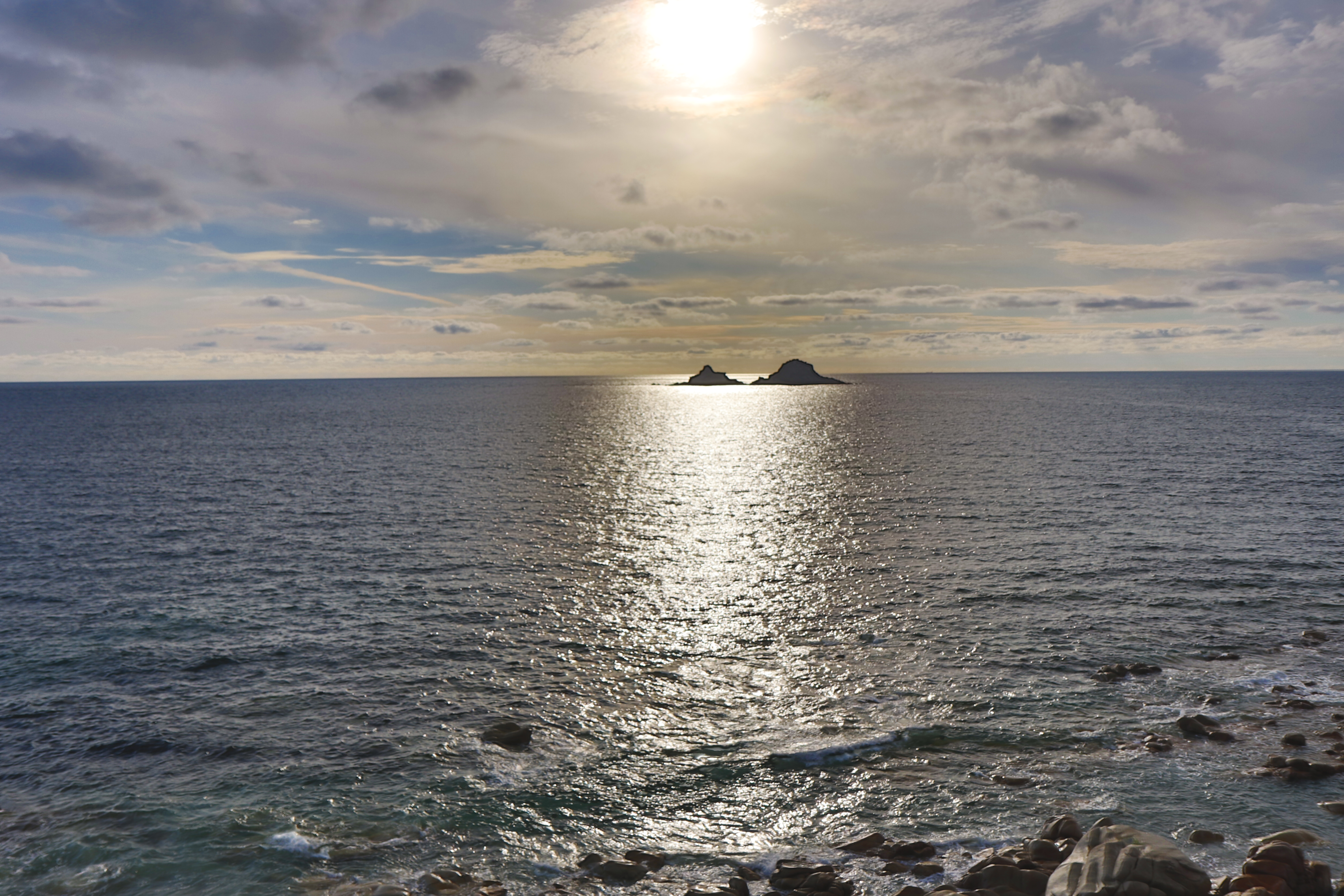
Sparkling Sun at The Brisons

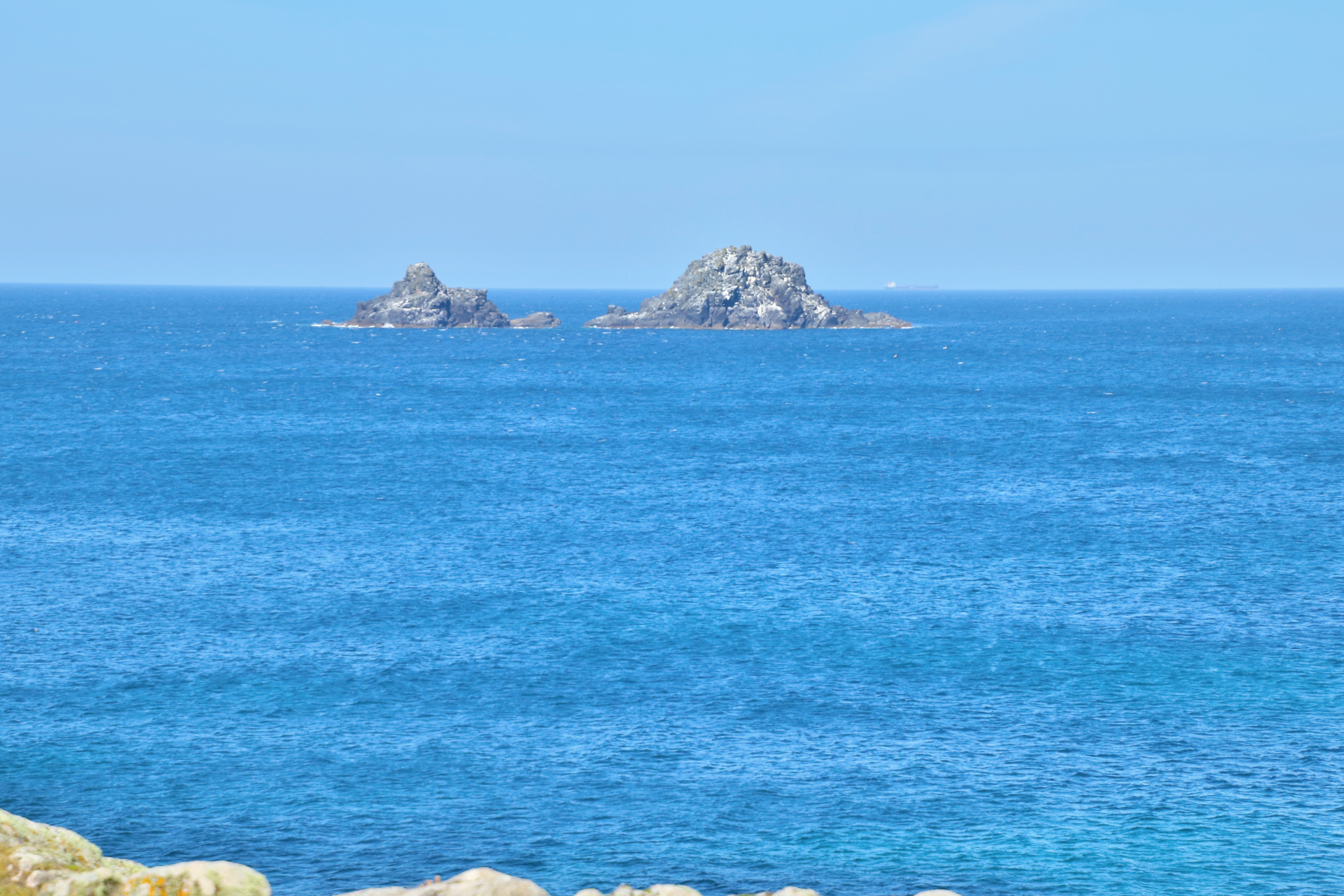
The Brisons

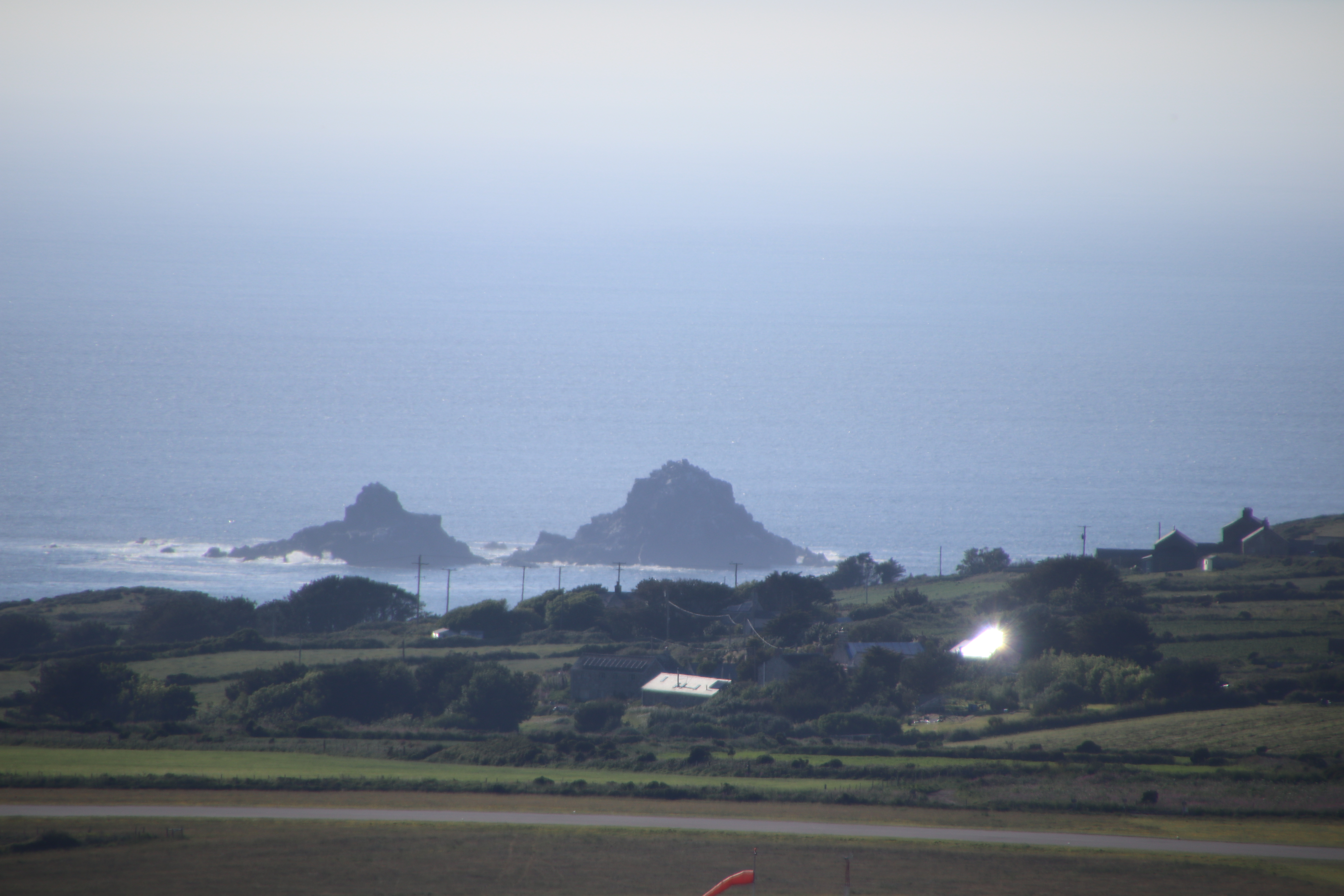
The Brisons seen from Carn Brea

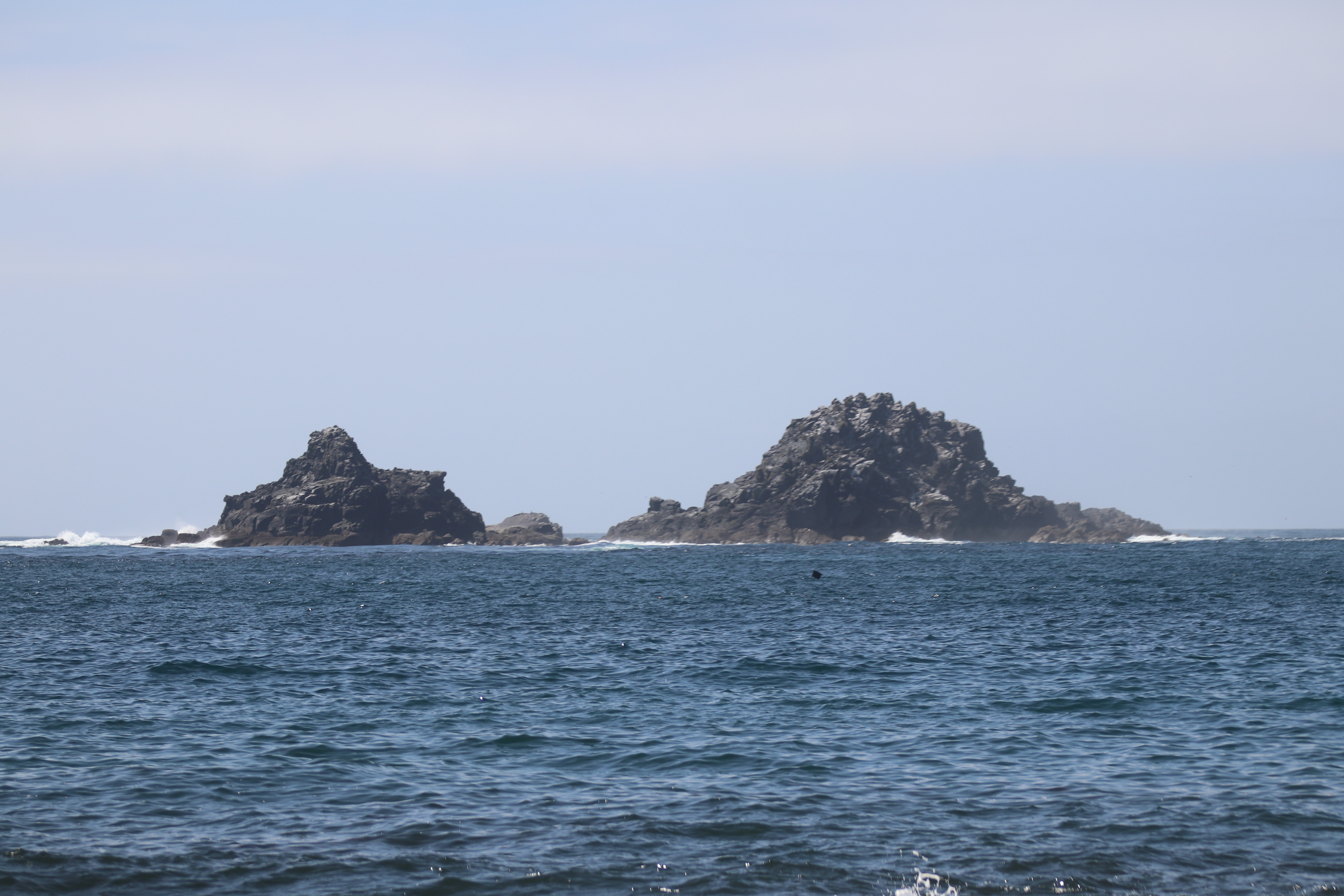
The Brisons

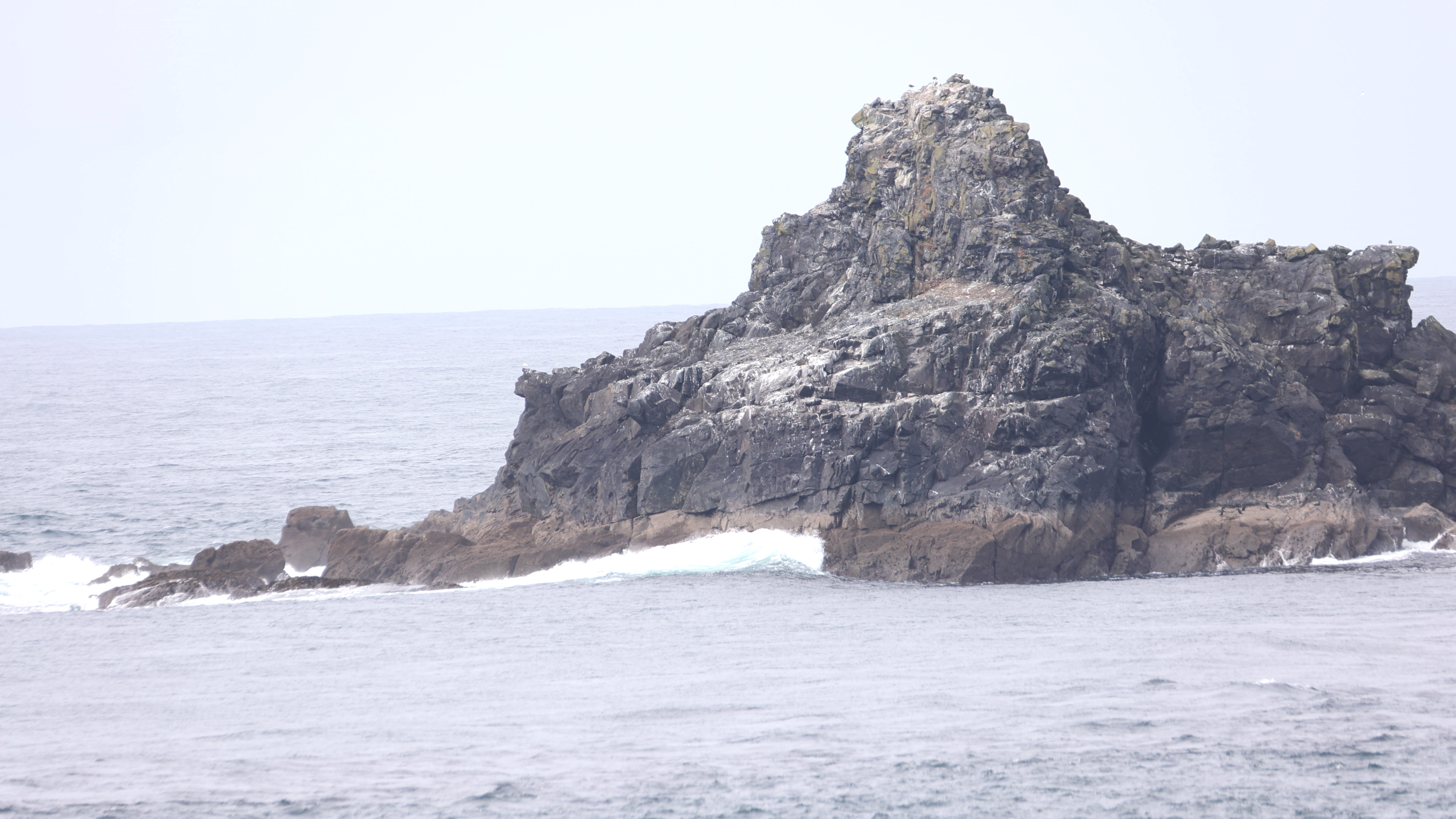
Closer image of the Southerly (left) islet
