= Joe Cornish (photographer) =

British photographer (born 1958)

Joe Cornish FRPS
- Born: 4 March 1958; United Kingdom
- Known for: Photography
- Website: https://joecornish.co.uk/

Joe Cornish (born 4 March 1958) is a British photographer noted for his large format landscapes.

Born in Exeter, Devon, England in 1958, he graduated with a degree in Fine Art from University of Reading in 1980 and then went to America to train as a photographer's assistant. From 1982 he moved to London working first as a freelance assistant before starting out as a general purpose commercial photographer.

In 1986 his early travel and landscape photography was accepted into Charlie Waite's photolibrary, Landscape Only. From 1986 to 1995 Cornish was responsible for either all or the majority of the photography in more than thirty travel books.

His first job for the National Trust was the 1990 book In Search of Neptune and he has worked freelance on assignments for them ever since. Since 1993 Cornish has lived and worked close to the North York Moors and has photographed the North Yorkshire landscape for over 20 years, while still continuing to photograph around the British Isles and overseas.

Until its closure in December 2023 he co-owned the Joe Cornish Gallery in Northallerton North Yorkshire where he displayed a collection of his prints and hosted photographic and printing workshops.

In 2006 Amateur Photographer honoured him with their annual Power of Photography award, and in 2008 he was made an honorary Fellow of the Royal Photographic Society.

Cornish has been involved in the Distinction panels of the RPS, the judging team of Wildlife Photographer of the Year, and as host of the Natural History Museum's annual Understanding Photography events. He frequently lectures throughout the UK and abroad and his written work often appears in the online photography magazine On Landscape (of which he is a co-founder).

== Bibliography ==
- 2022 "Still Time To Wonder" (Johnsons Of Nantwich)
- 2022 "Woodland Sanctuary" (Johnsons Of Nantwich)
- 2015 "This Land" with Roly Smith (Frances Lincoln Publishers)
- 2010 "Ten Years at the Joe Cornish Gallery" Joe Cornish Gallery
- 2009 Scotland's Mountains: A Landscape Photographer's View (Aurum Press Ltd)
- 2008 The Northumberland Coast (Frances Lincoln Publishers)
- 2005 Scotland's Coast: A Photographer's Journey (Aurum Press Ltd)
- 2005 Working The Light: Landscape Photography Masterclass2 with Charlie Waite, David Ward and Eddie Ephraums (Argentum)
- 2002 First Light: A Landscape Photographer's Art (Argentum)
- 1998 Countryside with David Noton and Paul Wakefield (National Trust Books)
- 1998 Coast with David Noton and Paul Wakefield (National Trust Books)
