= Paul Wakefield =

English-born French cricketer

Personal information
- Full name: Paul George Wakefield
- Born: 6 March 1957 (age 69); Crewe, Cheshire, England
- Batting: Left-handed
- Bowling: Leg spin

Domestic team information
- Years: Team
- 1983: Cheshire
- LA debut: 29 June 1983 Cheshire v Kent
- Last LA: 29 June 1983 Cheshire v Kent

Career statistics
Competition	List A	ICC Trophy
Matches	1	2
Runs scored	13	24
Batting average	13.00	12.00
100s/50s	0/0	0/0
Top score	13	19
Catches/stumpings	0/0	0/0
- Source: CricketArchive, 17 October 2007

Paul George Wakefield (born 6 March 1957) is a French former cricketer. A left-handed batsman and leg spin bowler, he represented the France national cricket team at the 2001 ICC Trophy, having previously played minor counties cricket for Cheshire County Cricket Club.

== Career ==
Wakefield played for Cheshire in the Minor Counties Championship from 1975 until 1990, also playing one List A match for them against Kent in the 1983 Nat-West Trophy. He also played for Northamptonshire second XI in 1976 and for Worcestershire second XI in 1979.

He moved to France in 1994, and began playing for their national cricket team two years later. Amongst his matches for France include the 2000 European Championship in Glasgow and two matches in the 2001 ICC Trophy in Canada against Malaysia and Uganda.
