= Cape Cornwall =

Headland in Cornwall, England

Coordinates: 50.127°N 5.706°W

Cape Cornwall: Cornish: Kilgoodh
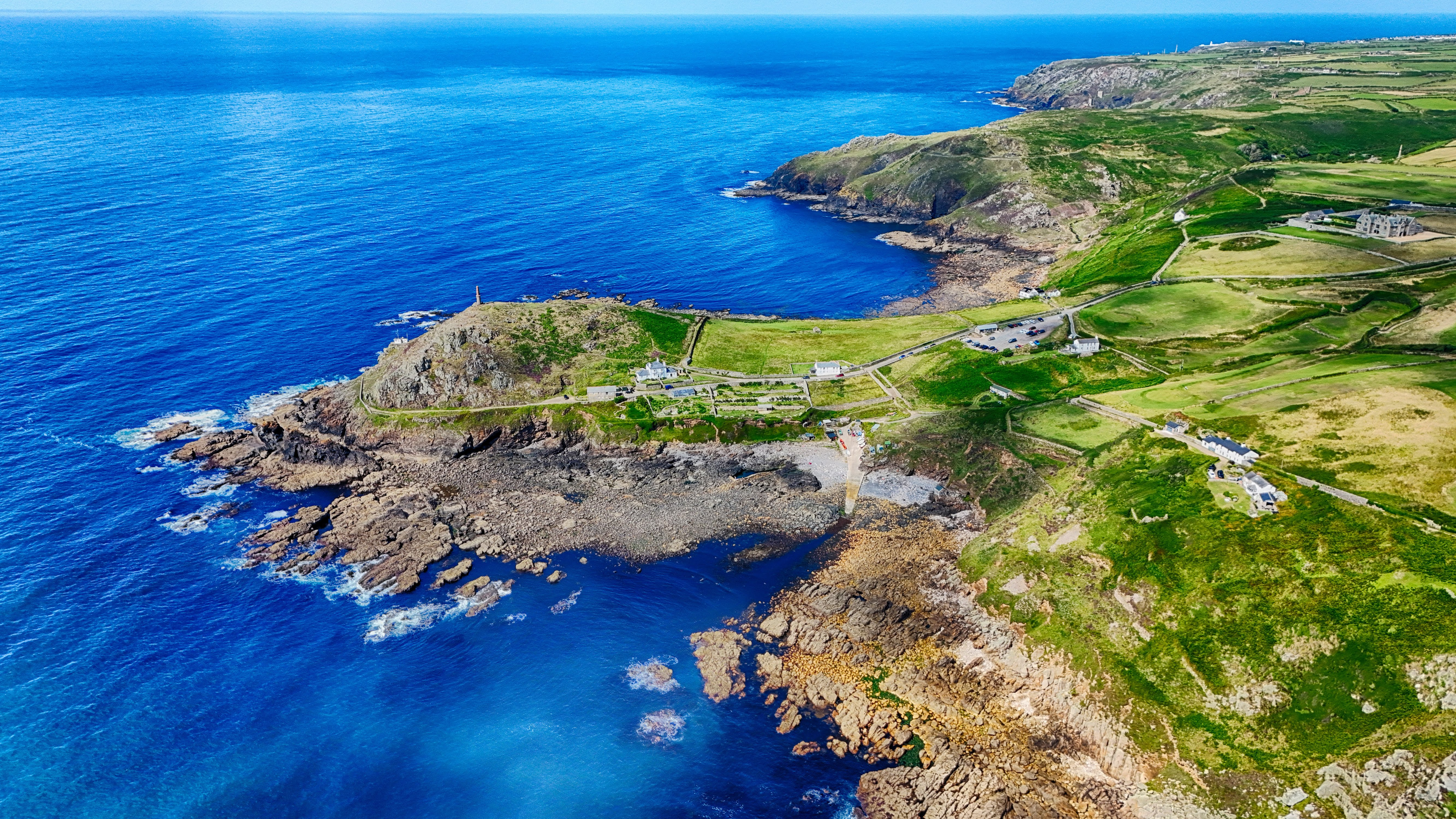
- Headland of Cape Cornwall looking towards Porth Ledden

- Location within Cornwall
- OS grid reference: SW371315
- Unitary authority: Cornwall
- Ceremonial county: Cornwall
- Region: South West
- Country: England
- Sovereign state: United Kingdom
- Post town: PENZANCE
- Postcode district: TR19 7
- Dialling code: 01736
- Police: Devon and Cornwall
- Fire: Cornwall
- Ambulance: South Western
- UK Parliament: St Ives

Cape Cornwall (Cornish: Kilgoodh, meaning "goose back") is a small headland in West Cornwall, England. It is 4 miles (6.4 km) north of Land's End near the town of St Just. Until the first Ordnance Survey in the early 19th-century, Cape Cornwall was believed to be the most westerly point in Cornwall.

Most of the headland is owned by the National Trust. National Coastwatch has a look-out on the seaward side. The only tourist infrastructure at present is a car park (owned by the National Trust), public toilets, and a refreshments counter during the summer.

The Brisons, two offshore rocks, are located approximately 1 mile (1.6 km) southwest of Cape Cornwall. They mark the starting line of the annual swimming race ending at Priest Cove.

== Etymology ==
The name Cape Cornwall appeared first on a maritime chart around the year 1600. The original Cornish name, Kilgoodh Ust, dates back to 1580. In English it translates to "goose-back at St Just", a reference to the shape of the cape. Later versions of the name dropped the 'Ust'. An alternative name, Penn Kernow, is a recent translation back to Cornish of the English.

== Early history ==
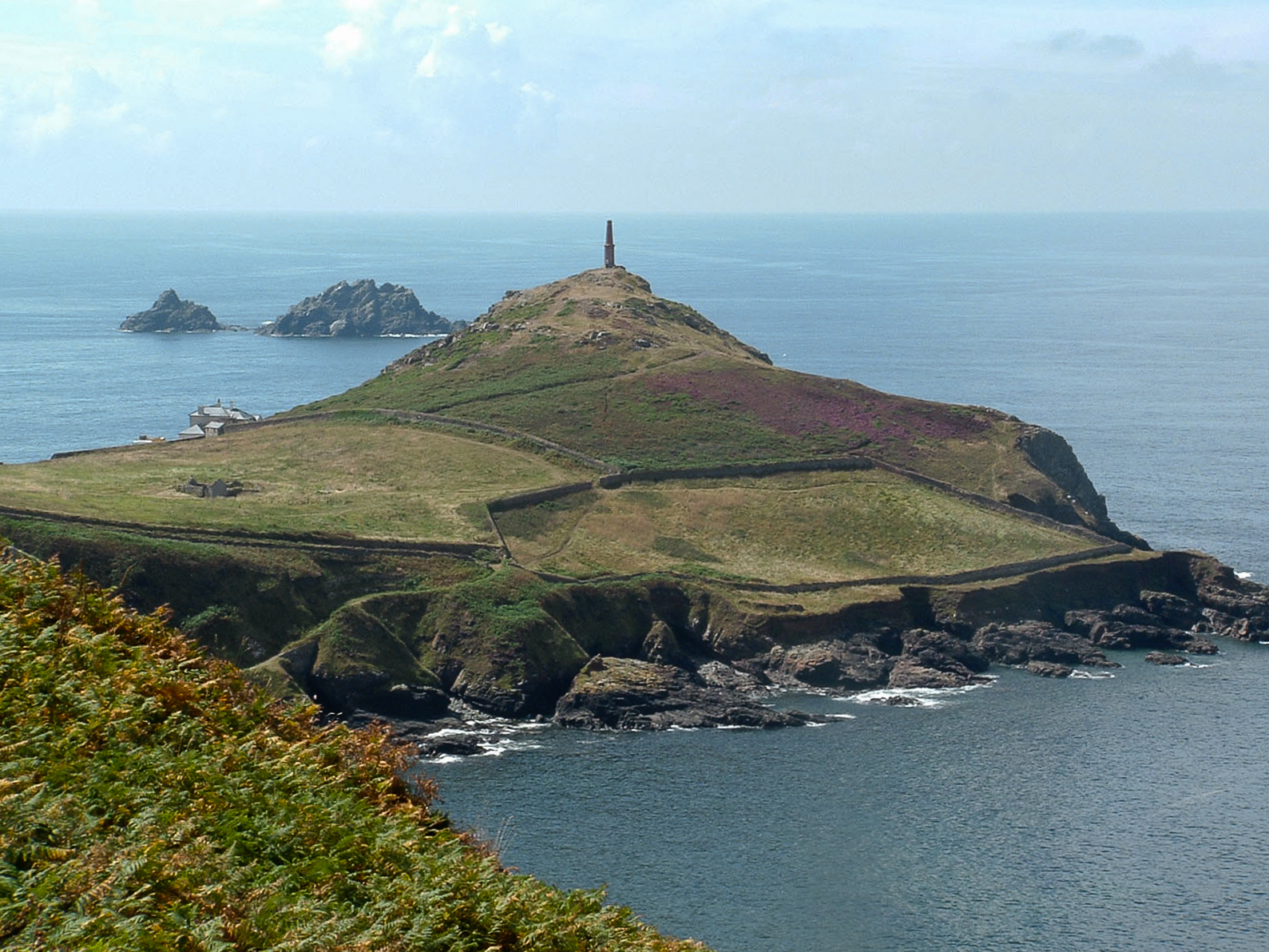
Heinz Monument (the 1864 chimney of the former Cape Cornwall Mine visible in the centre) commemorates the purchase of Cape Cornwall for the nation by H. J. Heinz Company. The ruins of St. Helen's Oratory can be seen on the left, with the two offshore rocks called The Brisons in the distance.

Pottery found in cists on the Cape have been dated to the Late Bronze Age. The presence of another cliff castle nearby (Kenidjack) may indicate that the area was important in the Iron Age. On the landward side of the Cape is the remains of the medieval St Helen's Oratory, which replaced a 6th-century church. A font now installed in the porch of St Just church may be from this building.

== 19th-century to present ==
Cape Cornwall Mine, a tin mine on the cape, was operated intermittently between 1838 and 1883. The mine's 1864 chimney near the peak of the cape was retained as an aid to navigation. In the early 20th century, the former ore dressing floors were for a time converted for use as greenhouses and wineries.

In 1987, the mine site was purchased by the H. J. Heinz Company of the United States (and British plants) and donated to the nation. The remains of Cape Cornwall Mine are designated as part of the Cornwall and West Devon Mining Landscape, a UNESCO World Heritage Site.

== Gallery ==
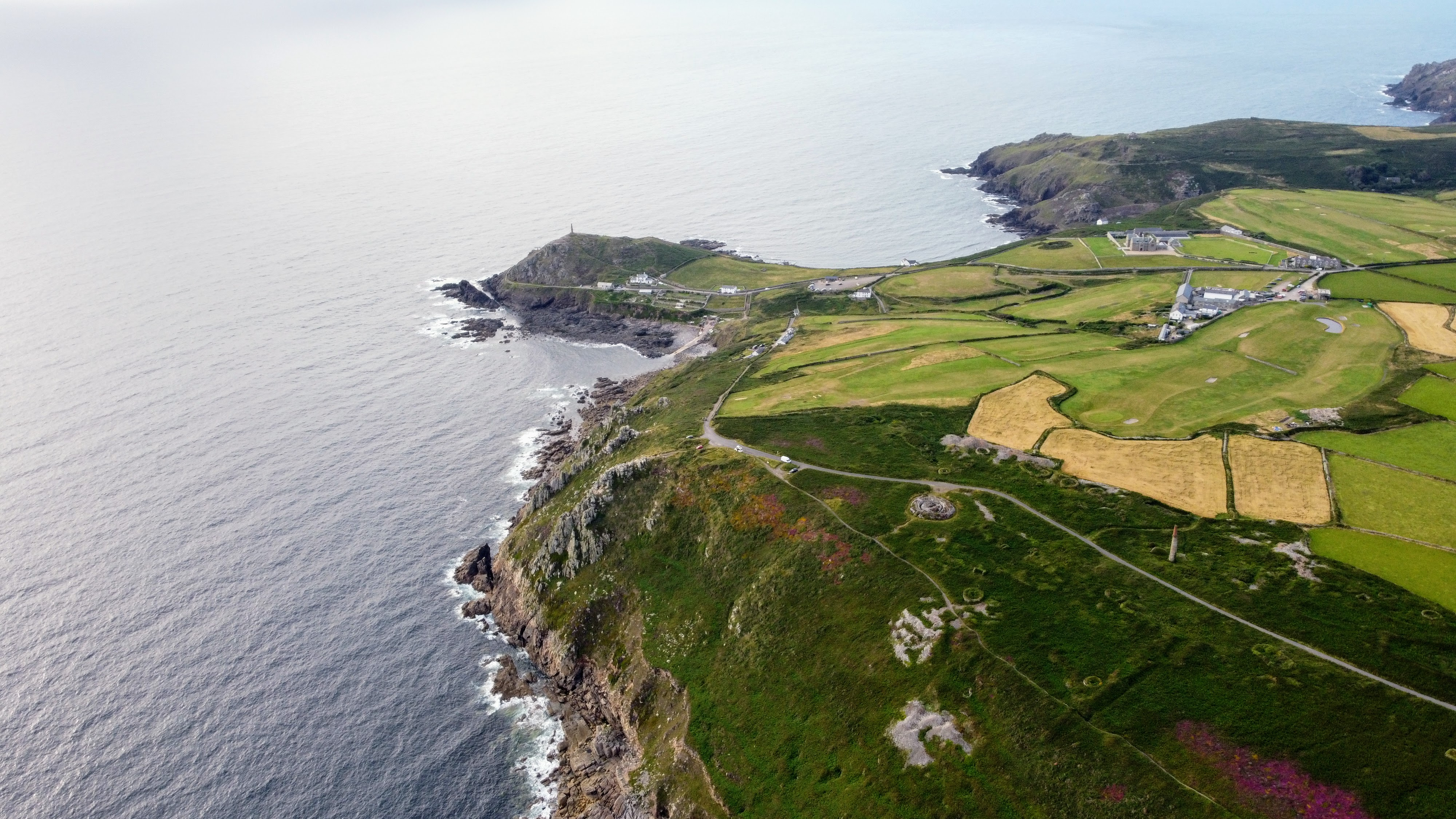

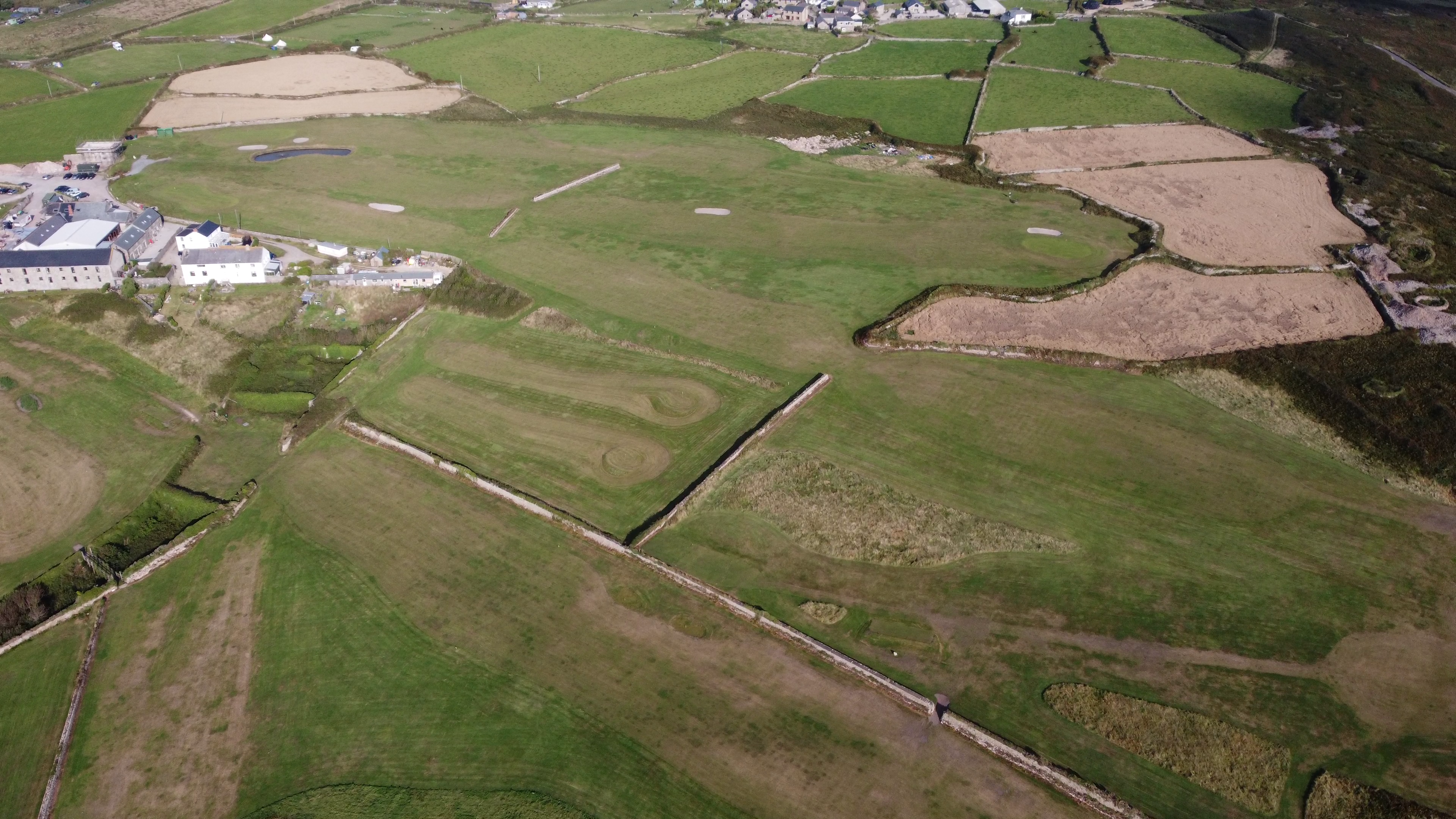
Cape Cornwall Golf Club

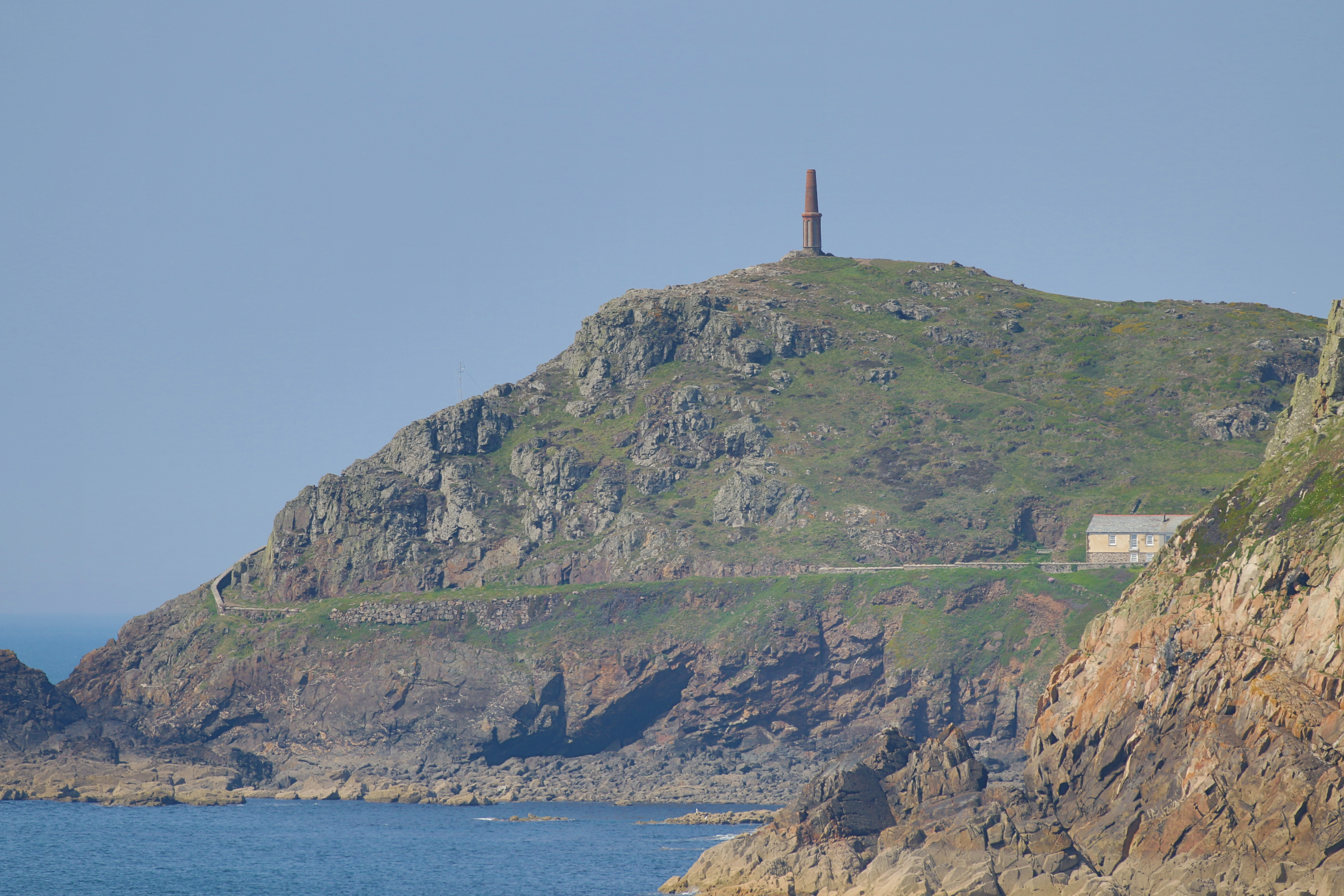
