= Perranporth (electoral division) =

Electoral division of Cornwall in the UK

Perranporth (Cornish: Porth Peran) is an electoral division of Cornwall in the United Kingdom that returns one member to sit on Cornwall Council. The current Councillor is Steve Arthur, a Conservative.

A ward of the same name returned one member to Cornwall County Council between 1973 and 2009, when the council was abolished.

== Cornwall Council division ==
Perranporth
- ward Cornwall Council
- Boundary of Perranporth in Cornwall from 2021.
- County: Cornwall

Current ward
- Created: 2021
- Councillor: Steve Arthur (Conservative)
- Number of councillors: One
- Created from: Perranporth; Mount Hawke and Portreath

2013–2021
- Number of councillors: One
- Replaced by: Perranporth
- Created from: Perranporth

2009–2013
- Number of councillors: One
- Replaced by: Perranporth
- Created from: Council created

=== Councillors ===
==== 2009-2021 ====
Election	Member	Party
2009	Michael Callan	Independent
2013	Michael Callan	Independent
2017	Michael Callan	Independent
2021	Seat abolished	

==== 2021-present ====
Election	Member	Party
2021	Steve Arthur	Conservative

=== Extent ===
==== 2013-2021 ====
The former Perranporth division covered the town of Perranporth, the village of Bolingey, and the hamlets of Callestick, Perranzabuloe, Penwartha, Perrancoombe, Cocks, Rose and Mount. The division covers 3,691 hectares in total.

==== 2021-present ====
The current division covers the town of Perranporth, the villages of Blackwater, Trevellas, Mithian and Bolingey, and the hamlets of Callestick, Perranzabuloe, Penwartha, Perrancoombe, Cocks. The village of Wheal Rose is shared with the Redruth North division.

=== Election results ===
==== 2021 election ====
2021 election: Perranporth
Party	Candidate	Votes	%	±%
Conservative	Steve Arthur	626	33.4	
Independent	Michael Callan	361	19.2	
Labour	Lin Scoffin	324	17.3	
Liberal Democrats	Guy Mitchell	251	13.4	
Green	Joel Ashton	165	8.8	
Independent	Rob Norrington	137	7.3	
Majority		265	14.1	
Rejected ballots		13	0.7	
Turnout		1877	38.4	
Registered electors		4890		
Conservative win (new seat)				

==== 2017 election ====
2017 election: Perranporth
Party	Candidate	Votes	%	±%
Independent	Michael Callan	778	50.1	
Conservative	William Rogers	599	38.5	
Liberal Democrats	David Neale	172	11.1	
Majority		179	11.5	
Rejected ballots		5	0.3	
Turnout		1554	41.7	
Independent hold		Swing		

==== 2013 election ====
2013 election: Perranporth
Party	Candidate	Votes	%	±%
Independent	Michael Callan	832	63.8	
Mebyon Kernow	Paul Dunbar	171	13.1	
Conservative	Lisa Marshall	143	11.0	
Independent	Mark Langdon	75	5.8	
Labour	Simon Coley	61	4.7	
Majority		661	50.7	
Rejected ballots		22	1.7	
Turnout		1304	34.4	
Independent hold		Swing		

==== 2009 election ====
2009 election: Perranporth
Party	Candidate	Votes	%	±%
Independent	Michael Callan	743	47.0	
Conservative	Rob Thomas	351	22.2	
Independent	David Hancock	285	18.0	
Liberal Democrats	Joseph Swain	150	9.5	
Labour	David Breacker	44	2.8	
Majority		392	24.8	
Rejected ballots		9	0.6	
Turnout		1582	43.3	
Independent win (new seat)				

== Cornwall County Council division ==
Perranporth
- Former ward Cornwall County Council
- County: Cornwall

1973–2009
- Number of councillors: One
- Replaced by: Council abolished
- Created from: Council established

=== Councillors ===
Election	Member	Party
1973	W. Rowse	Independent
1977	W. Rowse	Independent
1981	W. Rowse	Independent
1985	W. Rowse	Independent
1989	A. Tonkin	Independent
1993	K. Yeo	Liberal Democrats
1997	K. Yeo	Liberal Democrats
2001	K. Yeo	Liberal Democrats
2005	K. Yeo	Liberal Democrats
2009	Council abolished	

=== Election results ===
==== 2005 election ====
2005 election: Perranporth
Party	Candidate	Votes	%	±%
Liberal Democrats	K. Yeo	1,631	50.3	
Independent	J. Grant	792	24.4	
Labour	A. Basnett	430	13.3	
Mebyon Kernow	C. Mann	388	12.0	
Majority		839	25.9	
Turnout		3241	61.9	
Liberal Democrats hold		Swing		

==== 2001 election ====
2001 election: Perranporth
Party	Candidate	Votes	%	±%
Liberal Democrats	K. Yeo	1,566	40.2	
Conservative	A. Herd	1282	32.9	
Mebyon Kernow	E. Carter	594	15.2	
Labour	D. Hughes	455	11.7	
Majority		284	7.3	
Turnout		3897	61.4	
Liberal Democrats hold		Swing		

==== 1997 election ====
1997 election: Perranporth
Party	Candidate	Votes	%	±%
Liberal Democrats	K. Yeo	1,849	42.1	
Independent	D. Hancock	1313	29.9	
Conservative	A. Herd	1228	28.0	
Majority		536	12.2	
Turnout		4390	70.7	
Liberal Democrats hold		Swing		

==== 1993 election ====
1993 election: Perranporth
Party	Candidate	Votes	%	±%
Liberal Democrats	K. Yeo	1,444	61.9	
Conservative	S. Money	889	38.1	
Majority		555	23.8	
Turnout		2333	38.8	
Liberal Democrats gain from Independent		Swing		

==== 1989 election ====
1989 election: Perranporth
Party	Candidate	Votes	%	±%
Independent	A. Tonkin	1,393	51.9	
Conservative	J. Sweet	1289	48.1	
Majority		104	3.9	
Turnout		2682	43.3	
Independent gain from Independent		Swing		

==== 1985 election ====
1985 election: Perranporth
Party	Candidate	Votes	%	±%
Independent	W. Rowse	Unopposed		
Independent hold				

==== 1981 election ====
1981 election: Perranporth
Party	Candidate	Votes	%	±%
Independent	W. Rowse	Unopposed		
Independent hold				

==== 1977 election ====
1977 election: Perranporth
Party	Candidate	Votes	%	±%
Independent	W. Rowse	Unopposed		
Independent hold				

==== 1973 election ====
1973 election: Perranporth
Party	Candidate	Votes	%	±%
Independent	W. Rowse	933		
Independent	J. Tredinnick	708		
Independent	J. Williams	295		
Independent	E. Bebbington	236		
Majority		225		
Turnout		2172	45.5	
Independent win (new seat)				
