= St Agnes (electoral division) =

Electoral division of Cornwall in the UK

- ward Cornwall Council
- Boundary of St Agnes in Cornwall from 2021.
- County: Cornwall

Current ward
- Created: 2021
- Councillor: Pete Mitchell (Liberal Democrats)
- Created from: St Agnes; Mount Hawke and Portreath

2013–2021
- Number of councillors: One
- Replaced by: St Agnes
- Created from: St Agnes

2009–2013
- Number of councillors: One
- Replaced by: St Agnes
- Created from: Council established

St Agnes (Cornish: Breanek) is an electoral division of Cornwall in the United Kingdom and returns one member to sit on Cornwall Council. The current Councillor is Pete Mitchell, a Liberal Democrat.

== Councillors ==
=== 2013-2021 ===
Election	Member	Party
2009	Les Donnithorne	Liberal Democrat
2013	Pete Mitchell	Liberal Democrat
2017	Pete Mitchell	Liberal Democrat
2021	Seat abolished	

=== 2021-present ===
Election	Member	Party
2021	Pete Mitchell	Liberal Democrat

== Extent ==
2013-2021 division boundaries shown within Cornwall

=== 2009-2021 ===
Under its former boundaries, St Agnes represented the villages of St Agnes, Mithian and Trevellas, and the hamlets of Goonvrea and Goonbell. The village of Blackwater was also mostly covered, with the rest being covered by the Chacewater, Kenwyn and Baldhu division. The division was affected by boundary changes in 2013. From 2009 to 2013, it covered 2335 hectares; from 2013 to 2021, it covered 2,331 hectares.

=== 2021-present ===
With its current boundaries, the division represents the villages of St Agnes, Porthtowan and Mount Hawke, and the hamlets of Goonvrea, Goonbell, Banns and Menagissey. Most of the small village of Mawla is also covered; part of it is covered by the Redruth North division.

== Election results ==
=== 2021 election ===
2021 election: St Agnes
Party	Candidate	Votes	%	±%
Liberal Democrats	Pete Mitchell	1,204	56.5	
Conservative	Prasanth Panicker	380	17.8	
Green	Paul Clark	329	15.4	
Mebyon Kernow	Alan Sanders	204	9.6	
Majority		824	38.6	
Rejected ballots		15	0.7	
Turnout		2132	41.2	
Registered electors		5178		
Liberal Democrats win (new seat)				

=== 2017 election ===
2017 election: St Agnes
Party	Candidate	Votes	%	±%
Liberal Democrats	Pete Mitchell	908	63.9	
Conservative	Alan Dovey	406	28.6	
Labour	Damian Heholt	103	7.2	
Majority		502	35.3	
Rejected ballots		5	0.4	
Turnout		1422	38.1	
Liberal Democrats hold		Swing		

=== 2013 election ===
2013 election: St Agnes
Party	Candidate	Votes	%	±%
Liberal Democrats	Pete Mitchell	631	53.4	
Conservative	Dawn Brown	398	33.7	
Labour	Robert Harrison	147	12.4	
Majority		215	18.2	
Rejected ballots		23	1.9	
Turnout		1181	32.0	
Liberal Democrats hold		Swing		

=== 2009 election ===
2009 election: St Agnes
Party	Candidate	Votes	%	±%
Liberal Democrats	Les Donnithorne	874	57.2	
Conservative	Dawn Brown	548	35.8	
Labour	Susan Webber	75	4.9	
Majority		326	21.3	
Rejected ballots		32	2.1	
Turnout		1529	42.7	
Liberal Democrats win (new seat)				
