= Perran Round =

Amphitheater in Rose, Cornwall, England

- Plen an Gwari Lannberan (Cornish)
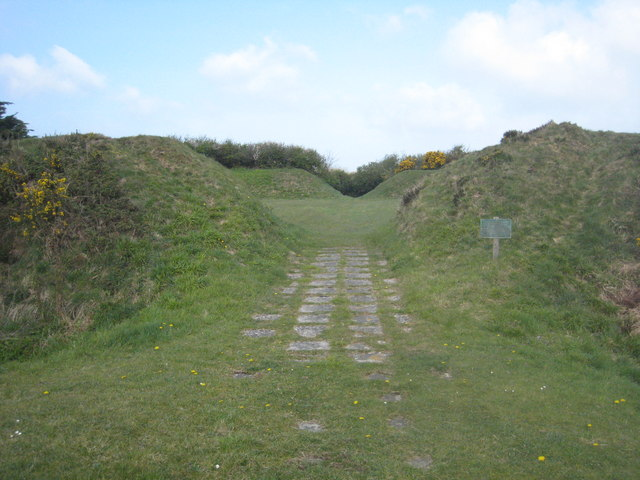
- Entrance to Perran Round
- Interactive map of Perran Round
- 50.3482°N 5.1234°W
- Location: Perranzabuloe, Cornwall
- OS grid reference: SW7788954476

Site notes
- Height: 3 metres (9.8 ft)

Scheduled monument
- Official name: St Piran's Round
- Designated: 30 May 1933
- Reference no.: 1016168

Perran Round (also known as St Piran's Round) (Cornish: Plen an Gwari Lannberan) is an amphitheatre in the hamlet of Rose, midway between the villages of Goonhavern and Perranporth, Cornwall, UK. It is described as the best surviving example of a plen-an-gwary, a medieval amphitheatre used for performing the Ordinalia, or Cornish miracle plays, and Cornish wrestling tournaments.

== Geography ==
Perran Round (grid reference SW778545) is on B3285 road between the mid-Cornwall villages of Goonhavern and Perranporth, in the parish of Perranzabuloe. The hamlets of Rose and Lower Rose are to the north-east and the round is surrounded by agricultural land. Between the round and the coast, 2.5 kilometres (1.6 mi) to the north is the Penhale Sands, sand dune system with the buried remains of the 6th-century St Piran's Oratory (grid reference SW768563) and a later church (now known as St Piran's Old Church, grid reference SW772564). Both were abandoned by encroaching sand.

== History ==
The origins of Perran Round are uncertain. It has been described as an Iron Age circular enclosure, or round and the citation under the Ancient Monuments and Archaeological Areas Act 1979 does describe Perran Round as a small enclosure of later Iron Age and early post-Roman period. A round consists of an embanked enclosure and is considered to be the Iron Age equivalent of a farming hamlet.

Henry Jenner compiled the scheduling paperwork which states that it is ″more probable″ that it was constructed as a plain-an-gwary, an open-air theatre for the performance of miracle plays although earlier structures were commonly repurposed as later 'playing places'. There are three medieval mystery plays, the Ordinalia, written primarily in Middle Cornish and dating to the late fourteenth century. Richard Carew in his Survey of Cornwall (1602) mentions ″Gwary miracles, kind of interlude, compiled in Cornish out of some scripture history.″ The round still contains a small trench, known as the ′Devil's Spoon′ for use in the performances. The earliest known plan, in William Borlase's Natural History of Cornwall shows two opposite entrances and the ″Devil's Spoon″, a hollow and trench on the eastern side of the arena. The plan also shows stepped terraces, presumably for seating which are no longer apparent.

The present B3205 road is shown on the 1813 Ordnance Survey map along with a track which goes through the round. The 1840 tithe map shows that the road through the round was discontinued and a new roadway constructed more or less parallel with the B3205.

From 1852, the Newlyn (east) Amphitheatre was enclosed and used by the Methodists. The pit could hold 1500 people and in 1880 was described as ″... kept exceeding neat and clean, having a small house inside its boundary, fitted up with every requisite for the preparation of those tea-meetings that have given it a name″. Anyone wishing to visit the round had to obtain the key from the minister or the chapel wardens. An 1880 edition of The Cornishman newspaper reported that before 1852 the round was said to be a quarry. (Note: Possibly quarry was a misprint for gwary.)

Before the First World War the round was used by both the Liberal Party and the Tory Party for political rallies. Between the wars the round was neglected and used as a rubbish dump, and in the 1930s was cleared by the Perranzabuloe branch of the Council for the Preservation of Rural England (CPRE).

By the Second World War it became a training ground for the Rose Platoon of the Home Guard with the tea room as the headquarters. After the war the Gorsedh Kernow (Cornish Gorseth) held its ceremony in the round on five occasions; 1946, 1958, 1970, 1985 and 1993 and it was once more used as a theatre.

As part of the Festival of Britain in 1951 the miracle play Bewnans Meryasek (The Life of St Meriasek) was performed by Gwaroryon Gernewek. Later performances of other plays included Cornish Ordinalia, in 1969, by the Bristol University Players, Gwyrans an Bys (Creation of the World) in 1973 and in July 1996 an extract from the Ordinalia. Miracle Theatre, the Cornish-based theatre group first ever performance was in the round.

== Condition of the monument ==
The diameter of the interior is about 45 metres (148 ft) and the circular earth rampart is around 3 metres (9.8 ft) high. The top of the rampart is flat and about 2.5 metres (8 ft 2 in) wide. The 2.5 metres (8 ft 2 in) ditch is continuous around the outside except for a causeway 4.5 metres (15 ft) wide at the southern entrance.

In the 1960s the round was once again neglected with the southern entrance waterlogged and the round covered in scrub. In 1967 Cornwall County Council raised the level of the forecourt and paved the entrance to improve drainage as well as some scrub clearing and reseeding. Following the management work, Perranzabuloe Parish Council leased the site and in 1884–85 there was further scrub clearance and the fence replaced. Rose Community Association and later Rose Men's Institute took over the management until 1995. The following year Cornwall Wildlife Trust undertook an ecological assessment and the British Trust for Conservation Volunteers cleared scrub from the outer face of the banks and the ditch. The Cornwall Heritage Trust now had the lease but did not maintain the site and in 2002, English Heritage handed the site to the current leaseholders, St Piran's Trust.

== Cornish wrestling ==
Cornish wrestling tournaments have not only been held at the round in ancient times, but also more recently, for example in the 1970s.

== Bibliography ==
- Cole, Richard (2005). Perran Round, Perranzabuloe, Cornwall (Report). Truro: Cornwall County Council.
