= Rose, Cornwall =

Hamlet in Cornwall, England

Coordinates: 50.351°N 5.127°W

Rose: Cornish: Ros
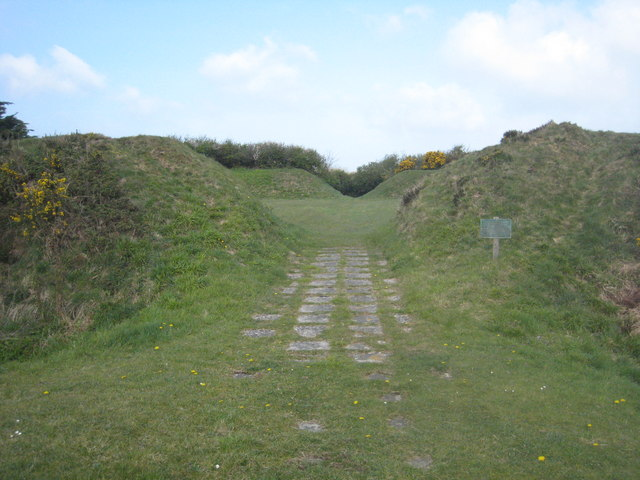
- St Piran's Round

- Location within Cornwall
- OS grid reference: SW776548
- Unitary authority: Cornwall
- Ceremonial county: Cornwall
- Region: South West
- Country: England
- Sovereign state: United Kingdom

Rose (Cornish: Ros) is a hamlet in mid-Cornwall, UK. Rose is to the north-west of Goonhavern and east of Perranporth.

Between Rose and Lower Rose is St Piran's Round (also known as Perran Round) (grid reference SW778545), a circular earthwork which could have originally been an Iron Age circular enclosure. It is considered to be the finest remaining example of a playing place or Plen-an-gwary – a medieval amphitheatre used for performing the Ordinalia, or Cornish miracle plays and hosting Cornish wrestling tournaments.

An article in an 1880 edition of The Cornishman newspaper reports that the present use of the Newlyn Amphitheatre (or pit) dates from 1852. Before this it was, said to be a quarry (Note: Could ″quarry″ be a misprint for gwary?) and it now has a small house inside the boundary, for use by the Methodists for tea-meetings.
