= Mount Hawke and Portreath (electoral division) =

Former electoral division of Cornwall in the UK

- Former ward Cornwall Council
- Boundary of Mount Hawke and Portreath in Cornwall from 2013-2021.
- County: Cornwall

2013–2021
- Number of councillors: One
- Replaced by: St Agnes; Illogan and Portreath; Perranporth; Redruth North
- Created from: Mount Hawke and Portreath

2009–2013
- Number of councillors: One
- Replaced by: Mount Hawke and Portreath
- Created from: Council created

Mount Hawke and Portreath (Cornish: Mont Hawk ha Porthtreth) was an electoral division of Cornwall in the United Kingdom which returned one member to sit on Cornwall Council between 2009 and 2021. It was abolished at the 2021 local elections, and was split between the divisions of St Agnes, Illogan and Portreath, Perranporth, and Redruth North.

== Councillors ==
Election	Member	Party
2009	Joyce Duffin	Liberal Democrats
2013	Joyce Duffin	Liberal Democrats
2017	Joyce Duffin	Liberal Democrats
2021	Seat abolished	

== Extent ==
The division covered the villages of Portreath, Porthtowan and Mount Hawke as well as the hamlets of Menagissey, Cambrose and Banns. Parts of Mawla and Wheal Rose were also included, with both being split between the divisions of Mount Hawke & Portreath and Redruth North. The division was minorly affected by boundary changes at the 2013 election. From 2009 to 2013, the division covered 2134.7 hectares; from 2013 to 2021, it covered 2135.2 hectares.

== Election results ==
=== 2017 election ===
2017 election: Mount Hawke and Portreath
Party	Candidate	Votes	%	±%
Liberal Democrats	Joyce Duffin	896	58.0	
Conservative	John Morgan	469	30.4	
Labour	Linda Moore	173	11.2	
Majority		427	27.7	
Rejected ballots		6	0.4	
Turnout		1544	41.6	
Liberal Democrats hold		Swing		

=== 2013 election ===
2013 election: Mount Hawke and Portreath
Party	Candidate	Votes	%	±%
Liberal Democrats	Joyce Duffin	808	66.3	
UKIP	Eileen Lewis	281	23.1	
Labour	Phillip Knight	123	10.1	
Majority		527	43.2	
Rejected ballots		7	0.6	
Turnout		1219	33.6	
Liberal Democrats hold		Swing		

=== 2009 election ===
2009 election: Mount Hawke and Portreath
Party	Candidate	Votes	%	±%
Liberal Democrats	Joyce Duffin	518	36.2	
Conservative	Eugene Hope	417	29.2	
Independent	Rose Woodward	130	9.1	
Mebyon Kernow	Ray Chubb	123	8.6	
Liberal	Lindsay Richards	78	5.5	
Labour	David Acton	57	4.0	
Independent	Ian Newby	56	3.9	
Independent	Dennis Howland	35	2.4	
Majority		101	7.1	
Rejected ballots		16	1.1	
Turnout		1430	41.2	
Liberal Democrats win (new seat)				
