= Bolingey =

Village in Cornwall, England

Coordinates: 50.33644°N 5.14353°W

Bolingey: Cornish: Melinji
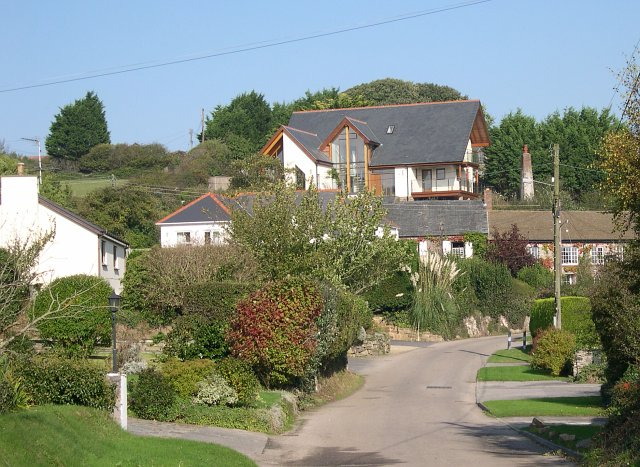
- Bolingey

- Location within Cornwall
- OS grid reference: SW762532
- Unitary authority: Cornwall
- Ceremonial county: Cornwall
- Region: South West
- Country: England
- Sovereign state: United Kingdom
- Post town: Perranporth
- Postcode district: TR6
- Dialling code: 01872
- Police: Devon and Cornwall
- Fire: Cornwall
- Ambulance: South Western
- UK Parliament: Truro & Falmouth

Bolingey (Cornish: Melinji) is a village on the north coast of Cornwall, England, United Kingdom. It is half-a-mile south of the small seaside resort of Perranporth and is in the civil parish of Perranzabuloe.

There is also a place called Bolingey in the civil parish of St Mawgan.

== Sports teams ==
The village is famous for its Bolingey Barbarians rugby team who play annual fixtures against Perranporth RFC on Boxing Day and against other invitation teams. Bolingey Barbarians were formed in 1990 with three specific objectives - to raise money for deserving organisations who look after children in Cornwall, to return to and enjoy the time when rugby was played solely for enjoyment both during the match and, more importantly, after the match and to only select and play against players who were over 35 years of age.

Each season all three objectives are met by playing no more than six matches and after each match they return to the Bolingey Inn to host the opposition in true old fashioned tradition. Perranporth RFC loan use of the ground and changing rooms for home matches. At the end of the season a tournament is held for invited veteran teams which is hosted at different clubs each year. As of 2007 Bolingey Barbarians have raised over £27,000 for charity.

== Cornish wrestling ==
Cornish wrestling tournaments, for prizes were held in Bolingey in the 1800s.
