= Penwartha =

Coordinates: 50.3271°N 5.1527°W

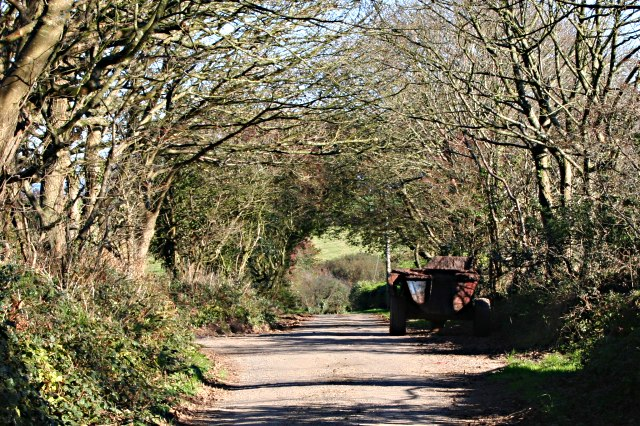
- The road by Higher Penwartha

- Location within Cornwall
- OS grid reference: SW7552
- Unitary authority: Cornwall
- Ceremonial county: Cornwall
- Region: South West
- Country: England
- Sovereign state: United Kingdom
- Police: Devon and Cornwall
- Fire: Cornwall
- Ambulance: South Western

Penwartha is a hamlet between Perranzabuloe and Perrancoombe in Cornwall, England.
