= Cocks, Cornwall =

Coordinates: 50.3300°N 5.1388°W

Cocks
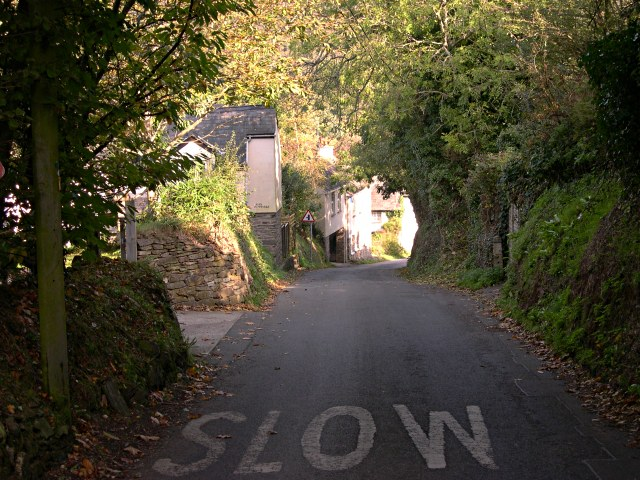
- Looking down the steep hill at Cocks

- Location within Cornwall
- OS grid reference: SW767525
- Civil parish: Perranzabuloe
- Unitary authority: Cornwall
- Ceremonial county: Cornwall
- Region: South West
- Country: England
- Sovereign state: United Kingdom
- Police: Devon and Cornwall
- Fire: Cornwall
- Ambulance: South Western

Cocks is a hamlet in the parish of Perranzabuloe in Cornwall, England. Cocks is southeast of Perranporth.
