= Mellangoose =

Coordinates: 50.095°N 5.241°W

Mellangoose: Cornish: Melingoos
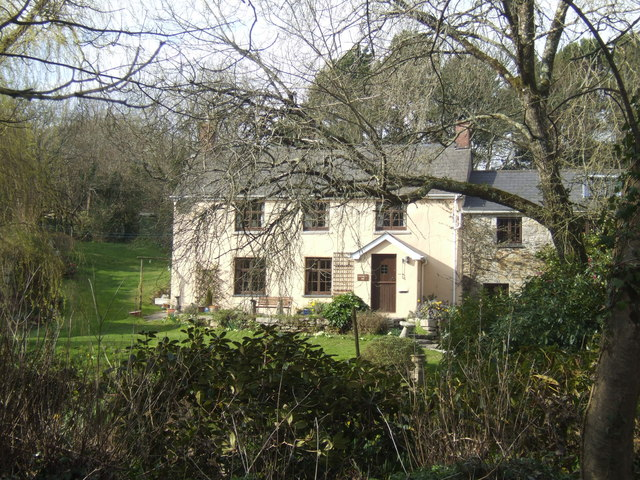
- A house at Mellangoose

- Location within Cornwall
- OS grid reference: SW683267
- Civil parish: Mawgan-in-Meneage
- Unitary authority: Cornwall
- Ceremonial county: Cornwall
- Region: South West
- Country: England
- Sovereign state: United Kingdom

Mellangoose (Cornish: Melingoos) is a hamlet in the parish of Mawgan-in-Meneage, Cornwall, England.

A site in Mellangoose is described as a Plen-an-gwary where the famous Cornish wrestler Captain Thomas Gundry regularly fought.
