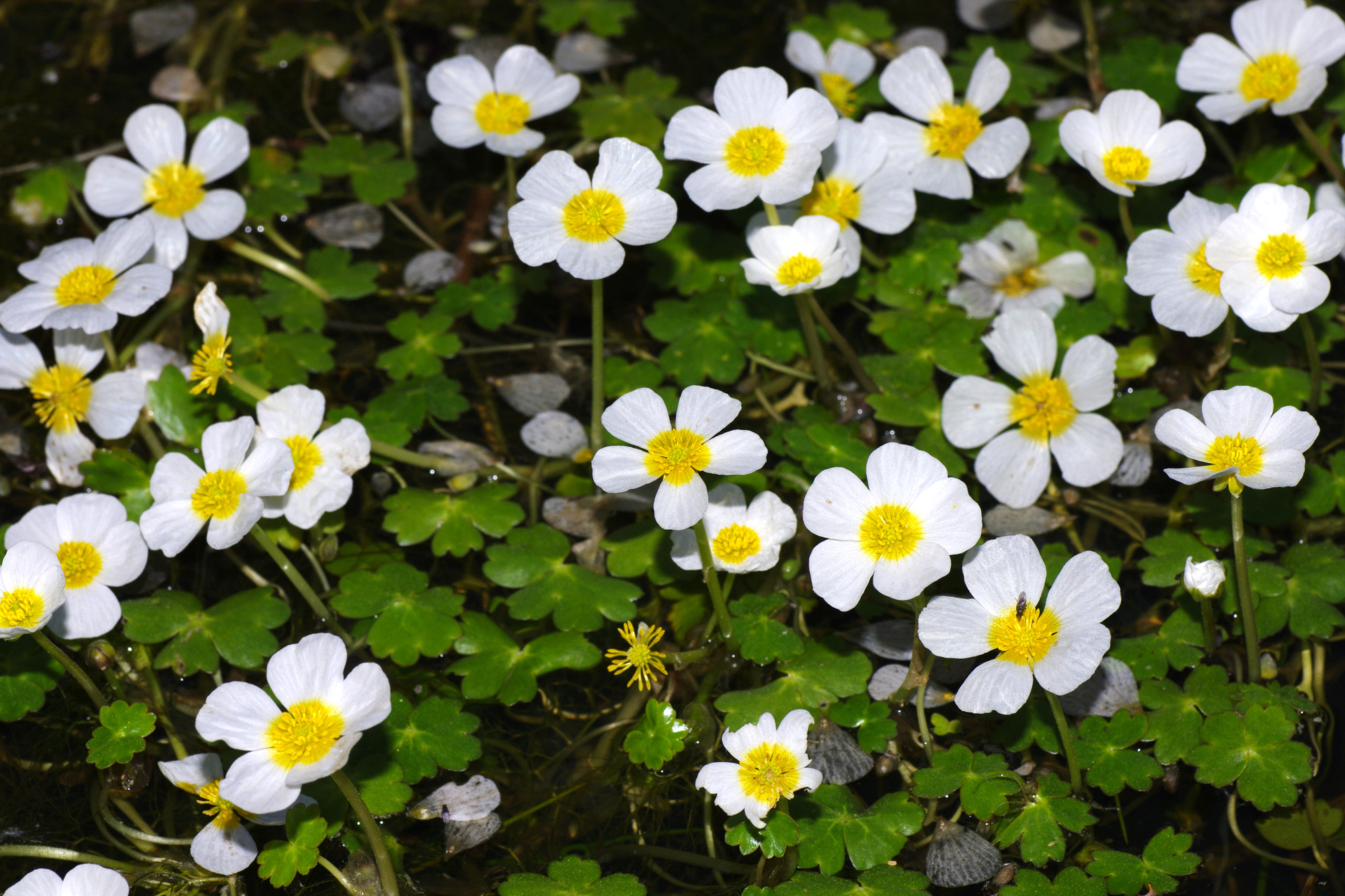

Conservation status
- Least Concern (IUCN 3.1)

Scientific classification
- Kingdom: Plantae
- Clade: Tracheophytes
- Clade: Angiosperms
- Clade: Eudicots
- Order: Ranunculales
- Family: Ranunculaceae
- Genus: Ranunculus
- Species: R. peltatus

Binomial name
- Ranunculus peltatus Schrank

Synonyms
- Batrachium floribundum Dumort.

= Ranunculus peltatus =

Species of flowering plant

Ranunculus peltatus, the pond water-crowfoot, is a plant species in the genus Ranunculus, native to Europe, southwestern Asia and northern Africa.

It is a herbaceous annual or perennial plant generally found in slow streams, ponds, or lakes. It has two different leaf types, broad rounded floating leaves 3–5 cm in diameter with three to seven shallow lobes, and finely divided thread-like submerged leaves. The flowers are white with a yellow centre, 15–20 mm in diameter, with five petals.

Some authorities consider there to be two sub-species; subsp. peltatus, which favours freshwater, and subsp. baudoti (Brackish Water-crowfoot) which is found in brackish coastal habitats. The latter now considered a entirely separate species, Ranunculus baudotii.
