= Mount Hawke =

Village in Cornwall, England

Coordinates: 50.2815°N 5.2085°W

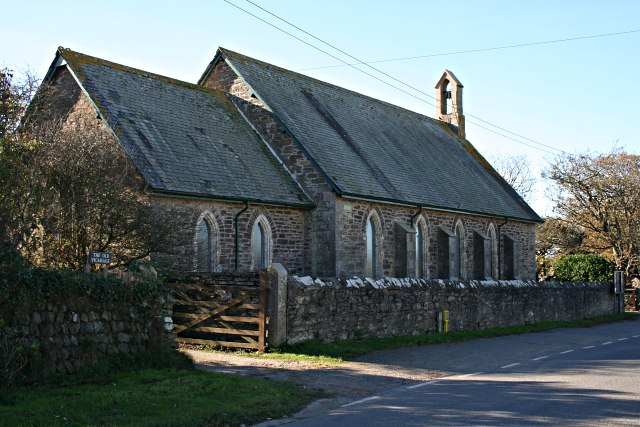
Mount Hawke parish church.

Mount Hawke is a village in Cornwall, United Kingdom. It is situated approximately eight miles (13 km) west-northwest of Truro, five miles (8.0 km) north-northeast of Redruth, and two and a half miles (4.0 km) south of St Agnes.

The village is in a former mining area in the administrative civil parish of St Agnes. It has a school, Mount Hawke Community Primary School, a post office and various shops. The settlements bordering Mount Hawke are Banns (northwest) and Menagissey (south); Porthtowan is further away westward.

The village is represented on Cornwall Council by the electoral division of Mount Hawke and Portreath. The population as of the 2011 census was 4,401.

== Churches ==
Mount Hawke ecclesiastical parish was created in 1847 from part of the parish of Perranzabuloe and a smaller part of the parish of Illogan. Before this date, Mount Hawke was enumerated under St Agnes. The parish has been in the Hundred of Powder and the Truro Registration District since its creation. It is in the rural deanery of Powder and the archdeaconry of Cornwall. The parish church is on the south edge of the village and is dedicated to St John the Baptist. It is built of local stone with Bath stone dressings in the Perpendicular style and was consecrated on 5 August 1878 by the Bishop of Truro, Edward Benson.

Mount Hawke also has an active Methodist chapel.

== Recreation ==
Mount Hawke is the location of Cornwall's largest indoor skatepark. There is also a cricket club which plays in the Cornwall League. The village has a park called the 'Millennium Green' with a jungle gym, a slide and swings. 'The Mount Hawke Boys' is a private club for young people. Mount Hawke also has its own Women's Institute building and a playschool held in the Methodist church.

== Cornish wrestling ==
Cornish wrestling tournaments, for prizes, were held in Mount Hawke in the 1900s.

== Railway ==
When the first section of the Truro and Newquay Railway was opened in 1903, it passed east of the village. In 1905, extra stations were provided along the line as halts. Mount Hawke Halt railway station was the first such halt for eastbound trains 1 5/8 miles from the junction with the main line west of Chacewater. The halt was nearly a mile from the village on the road to Chiverton Cross. The line closed in February 1963, the first Cornish railway to close under the Beeching axe.

== Notable residents ==
British singer-songwriter Alex Parks, winner of the television show Fame Academy in 2003, was brought up in Mount Hawke.
