= Redruth North (electoral division) =

Former electoral division of Cornwall in the UK

- ward Cornwall Council
- Boundary of Redruth North in Cornwall from 2021–present.
- County: Cornwall
- Electorate: 4744 (2025)

Current ward
- Created: 2021
- Councillor: Roger Tarrant (Restore Britain)
- Number of councillors: One
- Created from: Redruth North

2009–2021
- Number of councillors: One
- Replaced by: Redruth North
- Created from: Council established

Redruth North is an electoral division of Cornwall in the United Kingdom and returns one member to sit on Cornwall Council. The current councillor is Roger Tarrant, who was elected as a Reform UK candidate but defected to Restore Britain in April 2026.

== Councillors ==
Election	Member	Party
2009	Lisa Dolley	Independent
2013	Lisa Dolley	Independent
2017	Stephen Barnes	Labour
Boundaries altered
2021	Stephen Barnes	Labour
2025	Roger Tarrant	Reform UK
2026	Roger Tarrant	Restore Britain

== Extent ==
=== 2009–2021 ===
The division's boundaries remained relatively stable during boundary changes before the 2013 elections. Between 2013 and 2021, the division covered the north of Redruth as well as the villages of Tolgus Mount and North Country and the hamlets of Plain-an-Gwarry, Gilbert's Coombe and Sparnon Gate. Parts of Mawla and Wheal Rose are also included, with both being split between the divisions of Redruth North and Mount Hawke & Portreath. The division was separated from Redruth Central and Redruth South by the railway line and was separated from Four Lanes and Illogan by the stream through the Tolgus valley.

During the 2010s, the population of Redruth North grew at a significantly higher rate than other divisions in the area.

=== 2021–present ===
There are few changes to the boundaries after 2021; the division still largely covers the north of Redruth as well as Tolgus Mount, Gilbert's Coombe, Sparnon Gate and North County. The area between the railway line and Blowinghouse Hill and West End is now part of the Redruth South division, making the current division slightly smaller than under the previous boundaries.

== Election results ==
=== 2021–present ===
==== 2025 election ====
2025 election: Redruth North
Party	Candidate	Votes	%	±%
Reform	Roger Tarrant	659	47.9	
Labour	Stephen Barnes	315	22.9	
Green	Kim Elizabeth Cunningham	172	12.5	
Conservative	Alan Dovey	127	9.2	
Liberal Democrats	Philippe Marc Hadley	100	7.3	
Majority		344	25.0	
Rejected ballots		4	0.3	
Turnout		1377	29.0	
Registered electors		4,744		
Reform gain from Labour				

Tarrant was elected as a Reform UK candidate and was made Reform's deputy leader on the council in October 2025. In April 2026, Tarrant left Reform and joined Rupert Lowe's Restore Britain. Tarrant said he had become "disillusioned" by Reform becoming "too aligned with the Conservative Party manifesto" and had left "in response to feedback from my constituents". A Reform UK spokesperson said Tarrant was "a disgruntled individual who betrayed his colleagues and his residents" after he was not selected to lead the Reform group on Cornwall Council. Lowe welcomed him to the party, calling him "a businessman and a patriot".

==== 2021 election ====
2021 election: Redruth North
Party	Candidate	Votes	%	±%
Labour	Stephen Barnes	402	33.6	
Conservative	Bruce Craze	396	33.1	
Independent	Lisa Dolley	218	18.2	
Green	Zanliza Kramer	104	8.7	
Liberal Democrats	Linda Amoss	53	4.4	
Majority		6	0.5	
Rejected ballots		24	2.0	
Turnout		1197	27.2	
Registered electors		4406		
Labour win (new seat)				

=== 2009–2017 ===
==== 2017 election ====
2017 election: Redruth North
Party	Candidate	Votes	%	±%
Labour	Stephen Barnes	439	33.9	
Independent	Lisa Dolley	435	33.6	
Conservative	Ian Jones	345	26.6	
Liberal Democrats	Moyra Nolan	71	5.5	
Majority		4	0.3	
Rejected ballots		5	0.4	
Turnout		1295	27.2	
Labour gain from Independent		Swing		

==== 2013 election ====
2013 election: Redruth North
Party	Candidate	Votes	%	±%
Independent	Lisa Dolley	443	41.0	
Labour	Stephen Barnes	365	33.8	
UKIP	Ann Wood	266	24.6	
Majority		78	7.2	
Rejected ballots		6	0.6	
Turnout		1080	23.1	
Independent hold		Swing		

==== 2009 election ====
2009 election: Redruth North
Party	Candidate	Votes	%	±%
Independent	Lisa Dolley	366	37.3	
Labour	Stephen Barnes	278	28.3	
Conservative	Roger Pattinson	206	21.0	
Liberal Democrats	Sam Horwood	123	12.5	
Majority		88	9.0	
Rejected ballots		9	0.9	
Turnout		982	32.4	
Independent win (new seat)				
