= Callestick =

Hamlet in Cornwall, England

Coordinates: 50.310°N 5.125°W

Callestick: Cornish: Kellestek
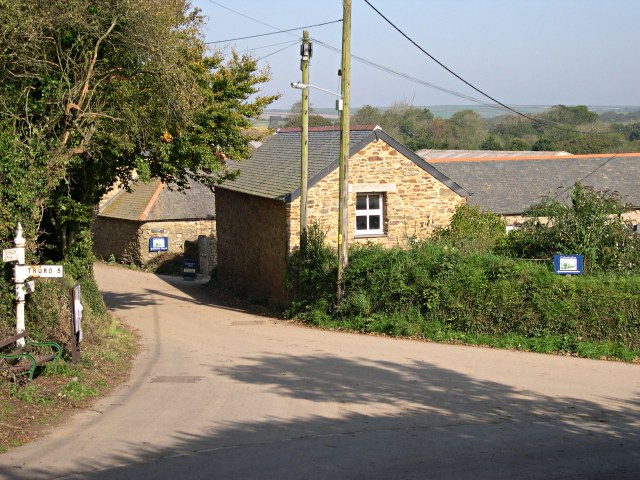
- Callestick

- Location within Cornwall
- OS grid reference: SW775502
- Civil parish: Perranzabuloe
- Unitary authority: Cornwall
- Ceremonial county: Cornwall
- Region: South West
- Country: England
- Sovereign state: United Kingdom
- Post town: TRURO
- Postcode district: TR4
- Dialling code: 01872
- Police: Devon and Cornwall
- Fire: Cornwall
- Ambulance: South Western
- UK Parliament: Truro & Falmouth

Callestick (/kəˈlɛstɪk/ kə-LESS-tik, Cornish: Kellestek, meaning Estek's cell) is a hamlet in Cornwall, England, UK. It is 5 miles (8.0 km) north-west from Truro and about 1 mile (1.6 km) south of Perranzabuloe. Little Callestick lies to the northeast, near Chyverton House. The name Callestick comes from the Cornish language roots kell "cell" and Estek, a personal name.

The manor of Callestick was recorded in the Domesday Book (1086) when it was held by Robert, Count of Mortain from Bodmin Monastery; before 1066 it had been held by a thane from the monastery. There was 1 hide of land and land for 4 ploughs. There were 12 serfs, 10 acres of woodland, 2 cattle and 30 sheep. The value of the manor was 3 shillings though it had formerly been worth £1 sterling.

Callestick lies between 155 feet (47 m) and 350 feet (110 m) above sea level.

== Landmarks ==
About 250 yards (230 m) to the north-west of the settlement is an English Heritage scheduled monument. It is the remains of a small round enclosure (called a round) of a type that dates back to sometime between the latter part of the Iron Age and post-Roman Britain. The round at Callestock Veor appears to be of a circular hut and is in a reasonable condition compared to other examples of these sites. It was probably the dwelling of a pre-historic farmer and other examples of such sites nearby have dated back to the Bronze Age with the earliest such examples at around 1,700BC. Just to the north of the A30 road and at around 0.7 miles (1.1 km) south-west of Callestick is a bowl barrow which is a scheduled ancient monument. A bowl barrow is a funerary monument that was built sometime in the Late Neolithic period to the Late Bronze Age (generally to the period 2400-1500 BC). The bowl barrow at Callestick Vean is a low mound, approximately 0.5 yards (0.46 m) high and with a diameter of around 22 yards (20 m). This bowl barrow is unusual in that it is on relatively low-lying ground; normally bowl barrows are constructed in a more prominent position, such as a hill top. A little further to the west, a further pair of bowl barrows lie close together and are also listed monument.

About 0.5 miles (0.80 km) to the south-east of Callestick is the West Weal Chiverton mine. It was mainly a lead mine producing over 45,000 tons of high grade lead and over one million ounces of silver between 1859 and 1886.
