= Penhale Sands =

Sand dunes in Cornwall, England

Penhale Dunes Treth Peran (Cornish)
- Site of Special Scientific Interest
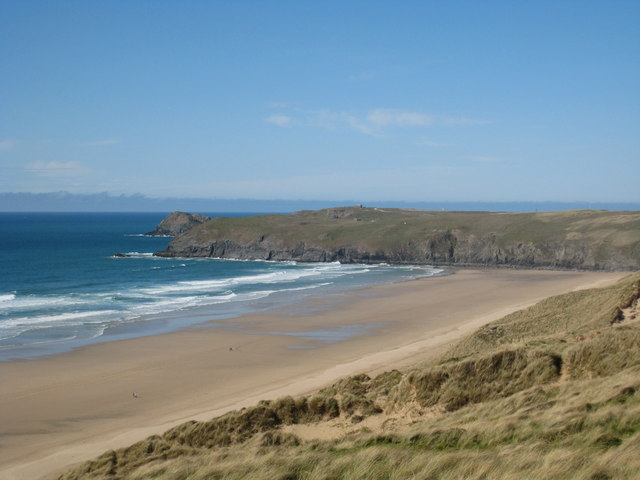
- Dunes at Penhale Sands and Perran Beach

- Location within Cornwall Location within England
- Location of Penhale Dunes Treth Peran (Cornish).
- Area of search: Cornwall
- Grid reference: SW771572
- Coordinates: 50.3728°N 5.1353°W
- Interest: Biological
- Area: 1,070.4 hectares (2,650 acres)
- Notification date: 1953

Penhale Sands (Cornish: Treth Peran, meaning St Piran's sands), or Penhale Dunes, is a complex of sand dunes and a protected area for its wildlife, on the north Cornwall coast in England, UK. It is the most extensive system of sand dunes in Cornwall and is believed to be the landing site of Saint Piran. Dating from the 6th century, St Piran's Oratory is thought to be one of the oldest Christian sites in Britain. The remains were discovered in the late 18th century, and in 2014 the covering sand was removed to reveal a building more than a thousand years old, in a reasonable state of preservation. A restricted military area dating from 1939, Penhale Camp, is found on the northern part of the dunes.

The area has been designated as a Site of Special Scientific Interest (SSSI) since 1953 and became a Special Area of Conservation (SAC) in 2004. The South West Coast Path runs through the dunes.

== Geography ==
The sands are located 5 miles (8.0 km) south-west of the town of Newquay, in the civil parish of Perranzabuloe, stretching for over 2.5 miles (4.0 km) between Perranporth in the south and Holywell to the north, with the Atlantic Ocean and Perran Beach to the west. The Cornish sand dunes are thought to have formed over 5,000 years ago as sea levels rose to approximately their present levels. Penhale Sands are the largest dune system within Cornwall and has a maximum depth of 48 metres (157 ft) of sand. The system, of over 650 hectares (1,600 acres), extends for more than 1 mile (1.6 km) inland and includes Reen Sands, Gear Sands and Perransands.

The South West Coast Path runs through the dunes.

== History ==
=== St Piran ===
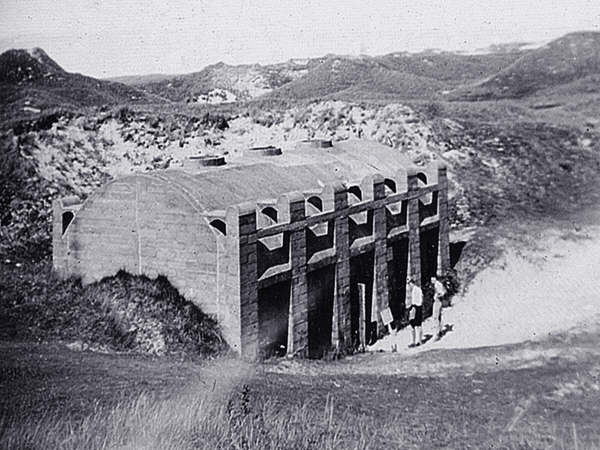
Building covering the partly excavated St Piran's Oratory in 1952

Penhale Sands and Perran Beach are believed to be the 6th century landing site of Saint Piran from Ireland, regarded the bringer of Christianity to, and the patron saint of Cornwall. On this site, situated in a hollow, St Piran's Oratory was built around this time. It is thought to be the oldest Christian site in Cornwall and one of the oldest in Britain. The church was abandoned in the tenth century due to the encroachment of sand. A replacement church was built further inland and abandoned in 1795. The oratory site was excavated in 1835 and 1843 before the remains were encased in a large concrete structure in 1910. The concrete structure was removed in 1980 and the delicate site buried in sand for its protection. In 2014 the sand was removed to reveal the remains of the church.

=== Penhale Camp ===
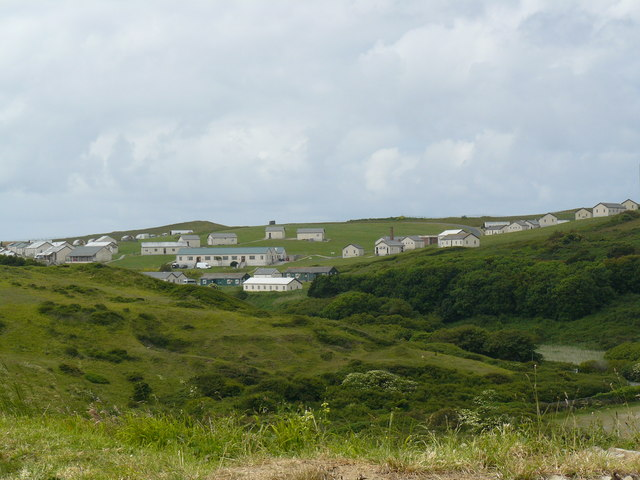
Penhale Camp in 2009

Penhale Camp was established in 1939, to the north of the dunes, as a World War II emergency measure to train anti-aircraft gunners. There still remains evidence of the gun sites, searchlight batteries and defensive positions such as pillboxes and trenches. On 7 June 1940 the camp was bombed by a single German bomber, probably looking for the nearby St Eval airfield; twenty-two British soldiers were killed in the raid, most were subsequently buried in nearby St Piran Church Perranzabuloe. In 1943 the camp was occupied by the United States Army Corps of Engineers as part of the buildup to Operation Overlord, the D-Day landings. The engineers built the fourteen Nissen huts on the Camp; still used today as accommodation for training units. In 1955, three Royal Artillery men drowned while swimming in the sea at Perran Corner. These dangerous waters, with treacherous rip tides, have also claimed the lives of at least two civilians.

The sand dunes have for many years been used by naturists, as an unofficial naturist beach. Over the years, the Ministry of Defence have complained about nude sunbathers, but a compromise was reached with the land owner in 2007

In April 2010, the camp was closed by the Ministry of Defence and was sold in September that year for £1.5 million. However, the area is still governed by Ministry of Defence Byelaws. Today, Penhale Camp and the associated training area are available to all Arms and Services wishing to carry out low level infantry skills training, cadre courses, communications and CPX training. The surrounding area provides opportunities for recognised adventurous training activities and newer extreme sports such as power kiting and coasteering. Now established in Penhale Camp is EBO Adventure Centre which provides a diverse range of training activities including Military Resettlement.

== Protected area ==
In 1953 the area was designated as the Perran Dunes Site of Special Scientific Interest (SSSI), changed to Penhale Dunes in 1967 after a site expansion. It is designated because it is an outstanding example of a sand dune system and has a rich flora, including four very rare species of plants and other rarities. In 2004 it was designated as a Special Area of Conservation (SAC). The SSSI is contiguous with Kelsey Head SSSI, to the north.

=== Wildlife and ecology ===
The dune soil is calcareous because of the high percentage of seashell fragments which leads to a flora with lime-loving plants that are otherwise rare in Cornwall. The flora also includes at least sixty-six species of moss, making it one of richest sites in Cornwall. A number of rare plant species have been recorded on the site, these include Babington's leek (Allium babingtonii), brackish water buttercup (Ranunculus baudotii), Cornish gentian (Gentianella anglica subsp. cornubiensis), fragrant evening-primrose (Oenothera stricta), Italian lords-and-ladies (Arum italicum), Portland spurge (Euphorbia portlandica), shore-dock (Rumex rupestris), slender spike rush (Eleocharis acicularis), variegated horsetail (Equisetum variegatum) and wild leek (Allium ampeloprasum). Due to its importance as a site for lichens and rare plant species, Plantlife has designated the dunes an Important Plant Area.

It is also an important site for its insect fauna, especially Lepidoptera, with the silver-studded blue butterfly sometimes counted in thousands. Twenty-seven species of butterfly and one hundred and seven species of moth have been recorded on the dunes. The exclusion of the public in the restricted military area of Penhale Camp has protected the nature conservation interest of this area.

== Radio receiver station ==
Penhale Sands is home to a high frequency receiver station forming part of the Defence High Frequency Communications Service. The station is operated by Babcock International Group on behalf of the Ministry of Defence.

== Folklore ==
=== Langarroc ===
Penhale Sands is said to be the site of the legendary sunken town of Langarroc. On stormy nights the bells of Langarroc's seven churches are still heard to toll beneath the dunes.
