= Gilbert's Coombe =

Hamlet in west Cornwall, England

Coordinates: 50°14′50″N 5°14′26″W

Gilbert's Coombe: Cornish: Komm Jylbert
- Hamlet
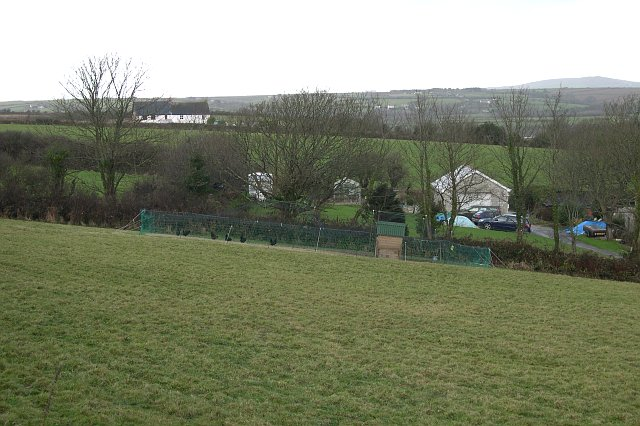
- The valley side near Gilbert's Coombe

- Location within Cornwall
- Unitary authority: Cornwall
- Region: South West
- Country: England
- Sovereign state: United Kingdom
- Police: Devon and Cornwall
- Fire: Cornwall
- Ambulance: South Western

Gilbert's Coombe (Cornish: Komm Jylbert) is a hamlet north of Redruth in west Cornwall, England. It fell within the Redruth North division on Cornwall Council.
