= Banns, Cornwall =

Coordinates: 50.288°N 5.216°W

Banns
- Location within Cornwall
- OS grid reference: SW 710 480
- Civil parish: St Agnes
- Unitary authority: Cornwall
- Ceremonial county: Cornwall
- Region: South West
- Country: England
- Sovereign state: United Kingdom
- Post town: TRURO
- Postcode district: TR4
- Dialling code: 01209
- Police: Devon and Cornwall
- Fire: Cornwall
- Ambulance: South Western
- UK Parliament: Camborne and Redruth

Banns is a hamlet in west Cornwall, England, United Kingdom situated between Mount Hawke and Porthtowan at grid reference SW 710 480 in the civil parish of St Agnes. The South West Coast Path is 2 km (1.2 mi) to the west of the hamlet. Banns is included in the Mount Hawke and Portreath division of Cornwall Council.

There is another place called Banns in the civil parish of St Buryan.

== Description ==
There are three principal features that define the Banns area: the vale or hollow, a mine and a farm, named Banns Farm. Cottages at Bannsvale Farm in Prince Royal Meadows are holiday rentals.

In 1880, there was also a place named Lower Banns near Banns in St Agnes. It was a 13-acre property owned by Francis Harris in 1873.

The Banns area includes a meadow named Prince Royal Meadows.

== Mining ==
Banns, which means hollow, is inland from Porthtowan and is surrounded by mines, such as Wheal Coates and Tywarnhayle Mine. There was a small abandoned copper mine named Wheal Banns.

The mine was also called the Prince Royal Mine. The mining area was described in 1828 as follows: "Crossing Prince's Common, a most desolate scene meets the eye; the surface is covered with small fragments of red decomposing slate, largely intermixed with pieces of quartz; the uniformity of this desert (which extends for many miles to the right and left) is only broken by the numerous heaps of rubbish, the remains of former mining operations. The fragments of rocks, thus exposed are of a bright red; and are derived from a slate similar to that which succeeds the felspar-rocks north of Cardrew."

By 1843 there was £10,000 invested in the mine improvements with a new company. In 1877 Prince Royal Mine, a tin mine, was owned by L. Walsad and a person with the surname of Duignan. It was located in Scorrier, St Agnes.

In 1881 the mine, now called Wheal Banns, produced and sold a little bit more than a ton of tin, which required a payment of dues to the Duke of Cornwall.
