= Judy Inglis =

British artist (1952–2003)

- Born: Judy Margaret Wain; 19 April 1952; Perranporth, Cornwall
- Died: 1 February 2003 (aged 50); Cheltenham, England
- Education: Falmouth School of Art; Exeter College of Art and Design; Sheffield City Polytechnic; Royal College of Art
- Known for: Painting, drawing

Judy Margaret Inglis, née Wain, (19 April 1952 – 1 February 2003) was a British artist known for her oil paintings and her draughtsmanship.

== Biography ==
Inglis was born at Perranporth in Cornwall and during 1970 and 1971 attended the Falmouth School of Art before spending a year at the Exeter College of Art and Design. She studied at Sheffield City Polytechnic from 1980 to 1983 and then at the Royal College of Art in London between 1984 and 1987. At the Royal College, she took a master's degree, won several prizes and spent time in Athens as an exchange student. On graduation, Inglis was awarded a year-long fellowship in painting at the Gloucestershire College of Art and Design and subsequently held the post of senior lecturer at Birmingham Polytechnic. Inglis retained the Birmingham post throughout her life and also had visiting lecturer posts elsewhere.

The first solo exhibition of Inglis' drawings and paintings was held at the Mappan Art Gallery in Sheffield in 1987 and was followed by further shows at the Birch & Conran Gallery the same year and at the Sue Williams Gallery in London in 1988 and 1990. Other exhibitions of her work took place at the Groucho Club in London during 1988, at the Ikon Gallery in 1991, the Paton Gallery in 1991 and at the Victoria Art Gallery in Bath in 1992. For a time Inglis lived, and maintained a studio, at Nailsworth in Gloucestershire and, after an 18-month illness, died at Cheltenham from cancer. Examples of her work are held by both Birmingham City Art Gallery and the Sheffield Galleries and Museums Trust.
