= Boscean =

Hamlet in Cornwall, England

Coordinates: 50.1313°N 5.6915°W

Boscean: Cornish: Bosseghan
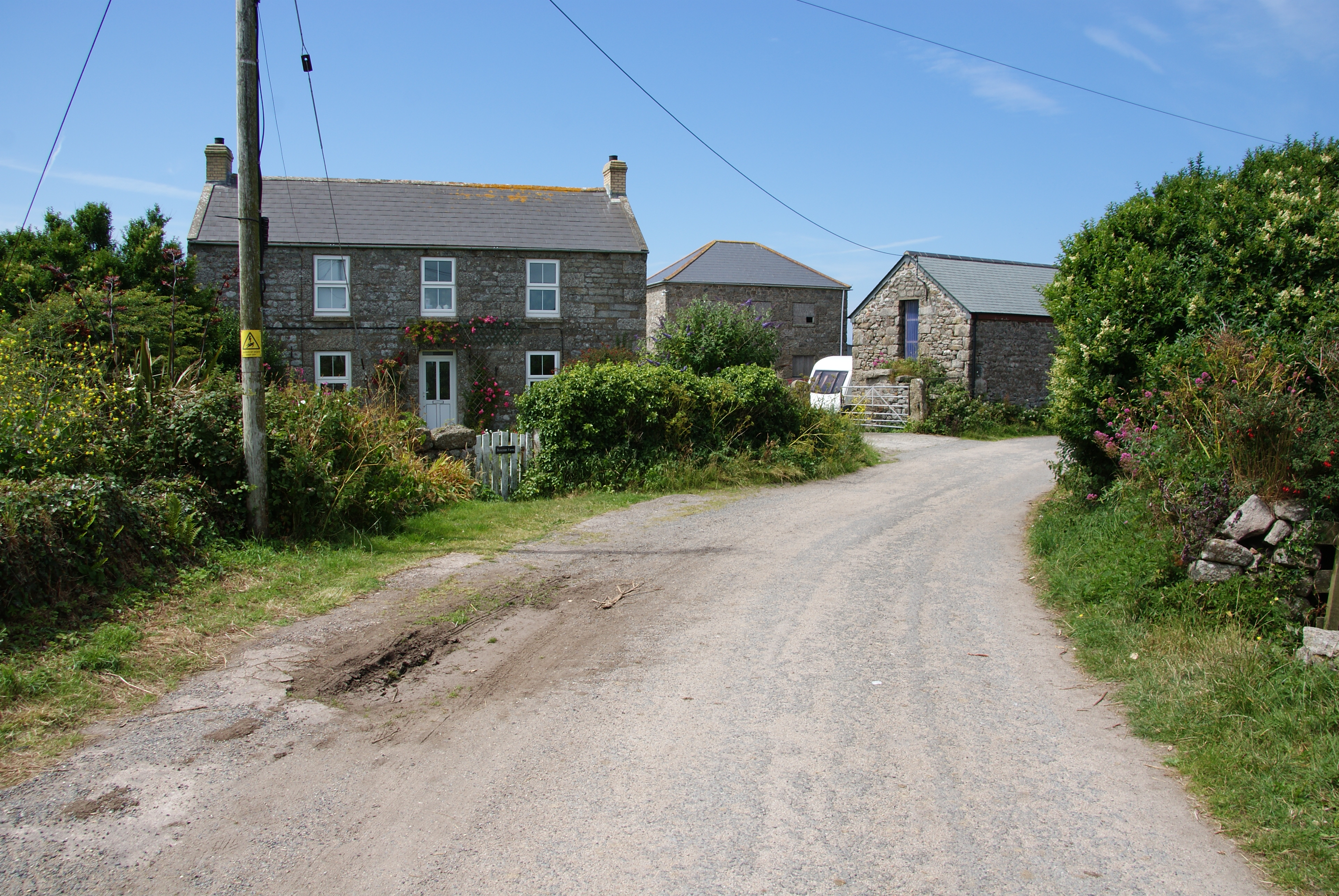

- Location within Cornwall
- OS grid reference: SW362321
- Civil parish: St Just
- Unitary authority: Cornwall
- Ceremonial county: Cornwall
- Region: South West
- Country: England
- Sovereign state: United Kingdom
- Post town: Penzance
- Postcode district: TR19
- Police: Devon and Cornwall
- Fire: Cornwall
- Ambulance: South Western

Boscean (Cornish: Bosseghan) is a hamlet in the civil parish of St Just, on the Penwith peninsula in west Cornwall, England, United Kingdom, approximately half-a-mile northwest of St Just. The name means 'waterless dwelling'.
