= Ralph Dunstan =

Ralph Dunstan (born 17 Nov 1857; died 2 Apr 1933) was born at Carnon Downs in the parish of Feock, Cornwall and is buried at Perranzabuloe. He is honoured now as one of the greatest song collectors in the Cornish musical tradition.

Dunstan is best known for his work The Cornish Song Book (Lyver Canow Kernewek) published by Reid Bros Ltd of London in 1929. He also wrote a requiem for his son and son-in-law who were killed in the First World War.

== Selected works ==
- The Composer's Handbook: a guide to the principles of musical composition (1909)
- The ABC of Musical Theory; with numerous original and selected questions and exercises
- Songs of the Ages
- Cornish Dialect and Folk Songs. London: Ascherberg, Hopwood & Crew (1932)
- A Cyclopaedic Dictionary of Music
- First Steps in Harmony
- Sight Singing through Song from Staff Notation (1921)
- The Cornish Song Book: Pt. 1. London: Reid Bros; reprinted (1974)
- The Cornish Song Book: Pt. 2 reprinted (1974)
- Hereafter Summer and Others
- Exercises in Voice-Production and Enunciation for Speakers and Readers
- Music to Shakespeare's Plays. Selected and arranged for the use of schools and colleges
- The Christian Pilgrimage
