= Goonvrea =

Coordinates: 50.303°N 5.220°W

Goonvrea: Cornish: Goonvre
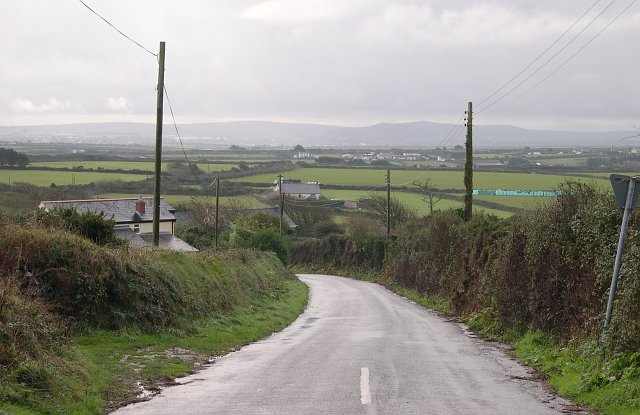
- Farmland between Bolster and Goonvrea Farm

- Location within Cornwall
- OS grid reference: SW708497
- Civil parish: St Agnes
- Unitary authority: Cornwall
- Ceremonial county: Cornwall
- Region: South West
- Country: England
- Sovereign state: United Kingdom
- Post town: St Agnes
- Postcode district: TR5

Goonvrea (Cornish: Goonvre, meaning hill moorland) is a hamlet in the parish of St Agnes (where the 2011 census population was included), Cornwall, England.
