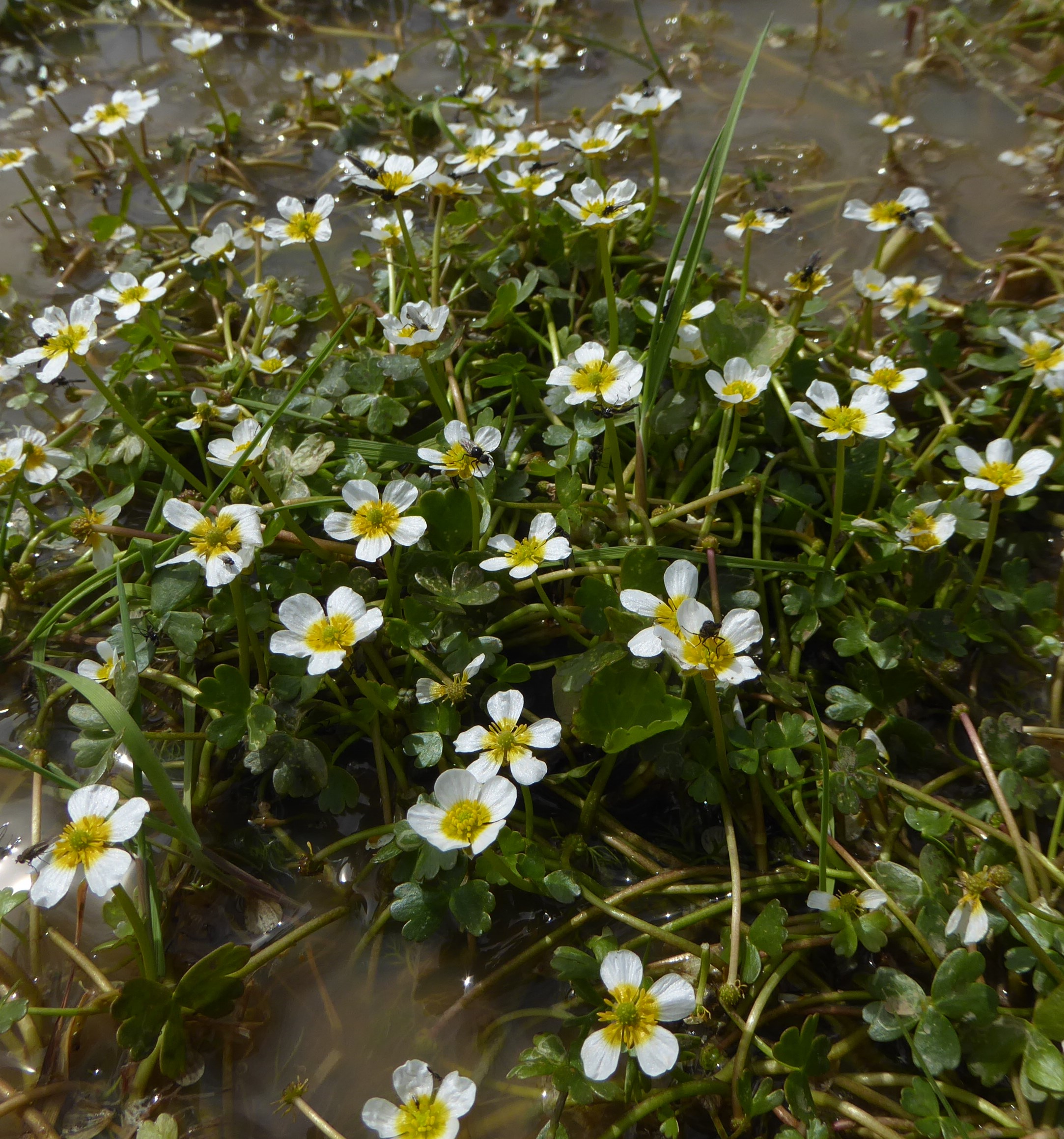

Conservation status
- Least Concern (IUCN 3.1)

Scientific classification
- Kingdom: Plantae
- Clade: Tracheophytes
- Clade: Angiosperms
- Clade: Eudicots
- Order: Ranunculales
- Family: Ranunculaceae
- Genus: Ranunculus
- Species: R. baudotii

Binomial name
- Ranunculus baudotii Godr.

= Ranunculus baudotii =

Species of flowering plant

Ranunculus baudotii, brackish water-crowfoot, is a flowering plant in the Ranunculaceae (buttercup family). As the name suggests, it tends to grow near the sea, typically in pools and ditches in coastal marshes that are slightly salty due to sea spray. It can also be found inland where there is some saline influence. It is not edible and has economic uses, but it is generally valued as a plant of conservation interest and an indicator of less agriculturally improved habitat.

== Description ==
Brackish water-crowfoot is an annual or perennial aquatic plant with stems up to 3 m (9 ft) long, becoming terrestrial as its habitat dries out in summer. The submerged capillary leaves are usually about 5 cm long, but exceptionally as much as 15 cm and are characteristically shorter than the adjacent stem internode. The floating and terrestrial laminar leaves are typically deeply 3-lobed (divided more than halfway to the base) with and up to 1 cm long by 2.5 cm wide. All the leaves are arranged alternately along the stem, with petioles up to about 8 cm long (or even 20 cm long in the case of some submerged leaves). At the base of each petiole is a small, ovate stipule.

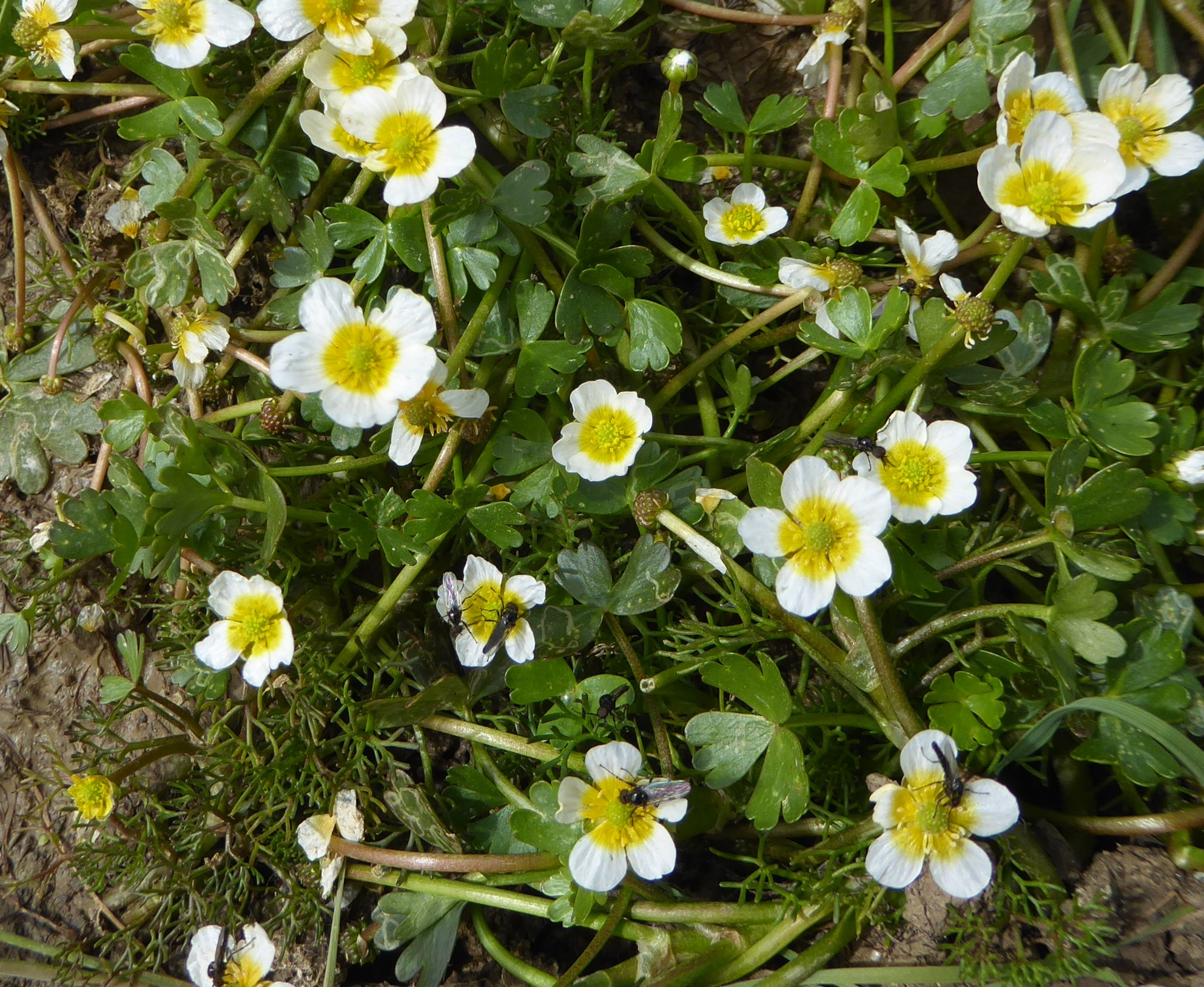
Plants characteristically have both laminar and capillary leaves.

Flowering occurs between May and September in Northern Europe. The flowers are borne singly on long pedicels arising opposite to a leaf (the pedicels are up to 10x as long as the corresponding petiole). The 5 petals are white with a yellow base, a lunate nectar pit, and are contiguous at anthesis. Each petal is about 1 cm long. There are also 5 sepals about half as long as the petals, which are greenish with dark markings, especially at the tip. The hermaphroditic flowers have 15–30 stamens and up to about 65 carpels.

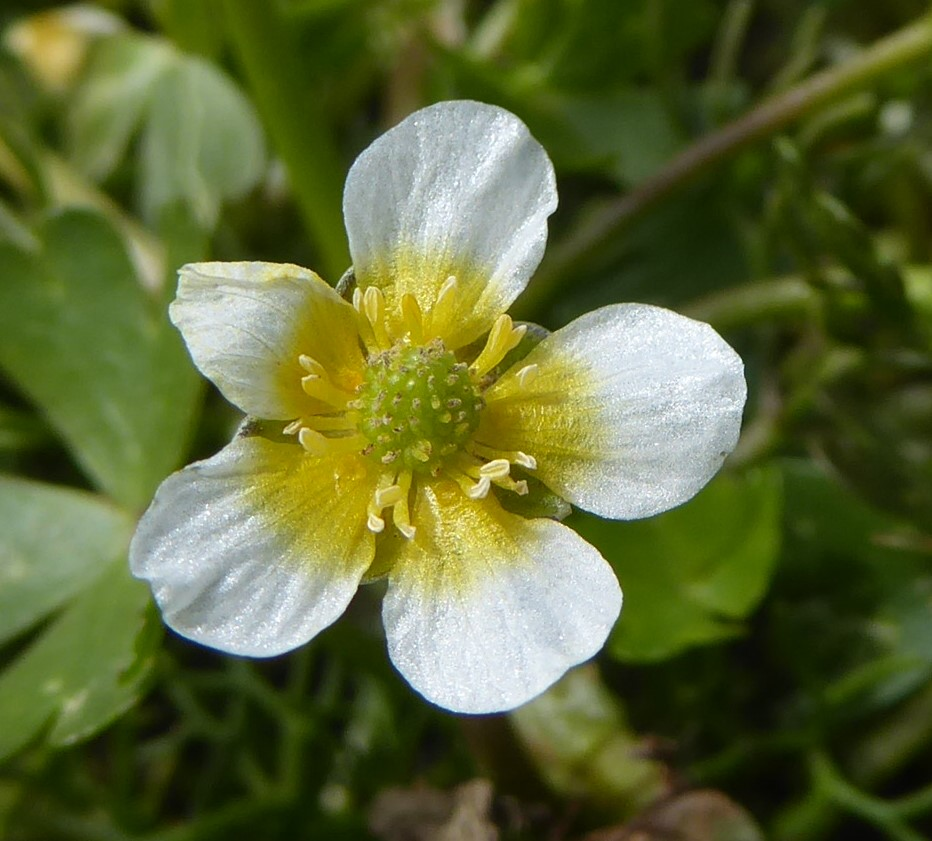
Close-up of the flower

The fruits are achenes 1.2–1.8 mm long with thin ventral and dorsal wings at maturity and a short, lateral beak.

== Identification ==
It can be very difficult to identify water-crowfoots. This species is distinguished by its habitat, which is usually very coastal, the combination of laminar and capillary leaves, and by the distinctive blue tips to the typically downward-pointing sepals. Confirmation requires examination of the winged achenes and the receptacle elongating in fruit.

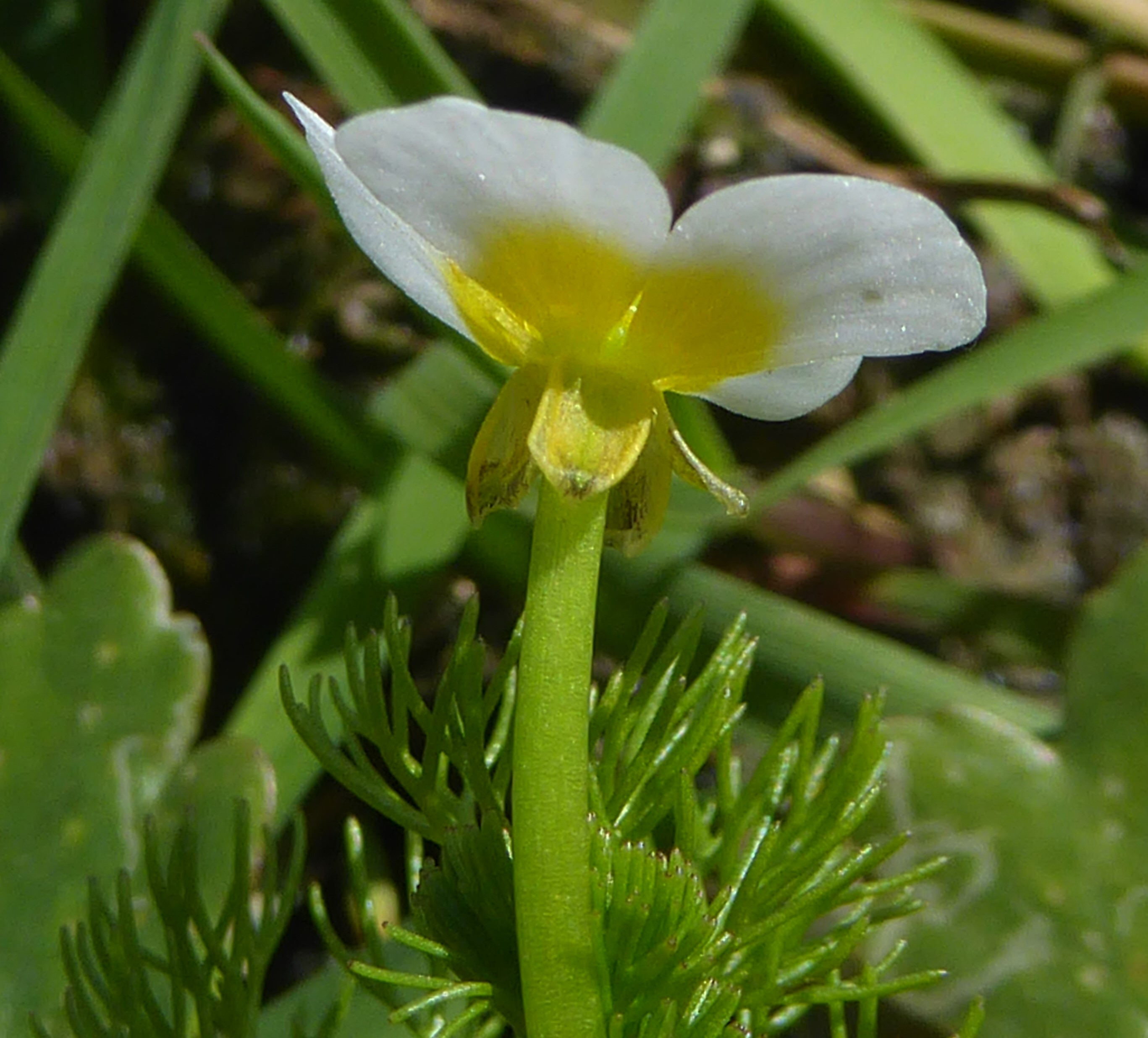
The sepals are recurved and blue-tipped.

== Taxonomy ==
This species was overlooked until 1839, when the name Ranunculus baudotii was published by Dominique Alexandre Godron in a journal in the French city of Nancy, giving the name in honour of the botanist Charles Joseph Auguste de Baudot, from nearby Sarrebourg. He was only just in time: in 1843 other names were independently given to similar plants in two publications in Scandinavia. It has accumulated many more synonyms since then: 35 of them are listed by the Royal Botanic Gardens, Kew. The most likely one to be encountered is Ranunculus peltatus subsp. baudotii (Godr.) Meikle ex C.D.K. Cook, which was coined in 1983 and has been used until recently in many botanical books.

It lies within the taxonomically difficult section Batrachium of the Ranunculaceae, a family that is known to be polyphyletic and therefore might be split. Some authors use the name Batrachium baudotii (Godr.) F.W. Schultz, which was originally coined in 1844 but may eventually be revived.

Godron's type specimen is located at the Institut de Botanique of the Université de Montpellier (MPU).

Brackish water-crowfoot is tetraploid (2n = 32) in the northern part of its range and diploid (2n = 16) in the south. The diploid populations are more similar to pond water-crowfoot in appearance.

It is known to hybridise with Ranunculus trichophyllus to give R. x segretii A. Félix and with R. aquatilis to give R. x lambertii A. Félix. Both of these hybrids are sterile. A third hybrid with R. peltatus has been artificially synthesised, but not yet found in the wild.

== Habitat and ecology ==
This species grows mainly in coastal grasslands, where it occurs in slightly brackish seasonal pools. It can also be found in highly alkaline fens and even freshwater rivers and pools inland.

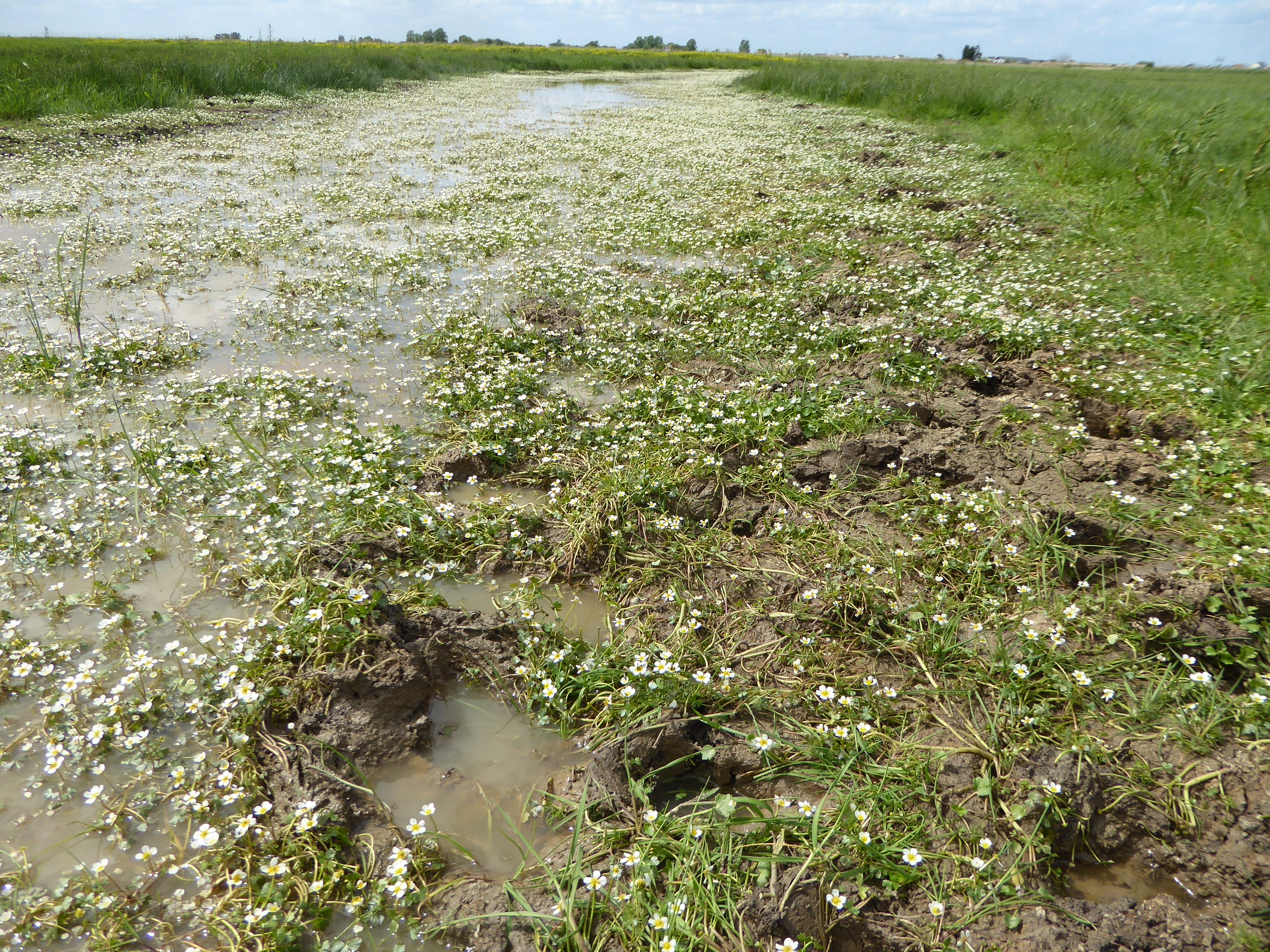
The habitat for brackish water-crowfoot is typically bare mud in drying pools.

Although it is normally found in coastal locations, below 10 m, it also occurs in karst springs in central Europe and old mineral workings and canals in England. It favours the boundary between freshwater and fully saline conditions.

It is largely self-pollinated, and produces good seed, but it can also spread by fragments rooting on bare mud, thus colonising large areas very quickly, but it is unable to survive competition with dense emergent species such as Bolboschoenus maritimus.

There are no insects recorded on brackish water-crowfoot specifically but various species feed on Ranunculus generally and can be found producing leaf mines and other damage to plants.

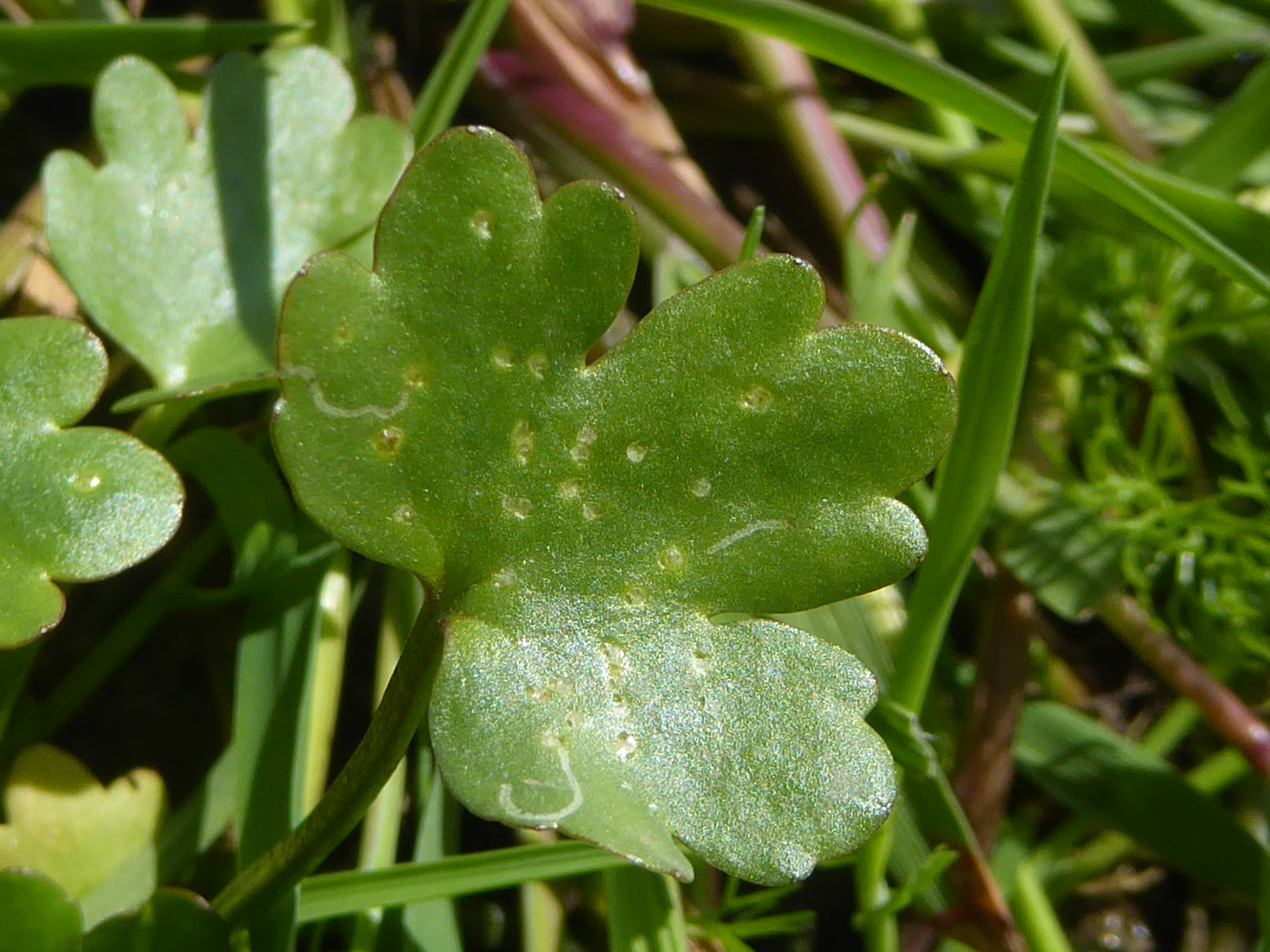
Insect damage to the leaves

== Distribution and status ==
Brackish water-crowfoot occurs throughout Europe, extending just as far as North Africa and westernmost Asia, but it is absent or extinct in some inland regions and countries, such as Switzerland. Its threat status globally has been assessed as LC (Least Concern).

It is usually considered an axiophyte, or plant of conservation importance, wherever it grows.

== Uses and in culture ==
Members of the Ranunculaceae contain an irritating glycoside, ranunculin, from which the volatile substance protoanemonin is formed. Animals tend to avoid eating them because the taste is acrid, unless they are dried in hay or sprayed with herbicide.
