= Plain-an-Gwarry =

Coordinates: 50.236°N 5.235°W

Plain-an-Gwarry: Cornish: Plen an Gwari
- Location within Cornwall
- OS grid reference: SW694423
- Civil parish: Redruth
- Unitary authority: Cornwall Council
- Ceremonial county: Cornwall
- Region: South West
- Country: England
- Sovereign state: United Kingdom

Plain-an-Gwarry (Cornish: Plen an Gwari) is a hamlet in the west of Redruth, Cornwall, England, UK. The name derives from Cornish plen an gwari (meaning "playing place"), an open-air performance area used historically for entertainment and instruction.
