= Menagissey =

Hamlet in Cornwall, England

Coordinates: 50.27513°N 5.21258°W

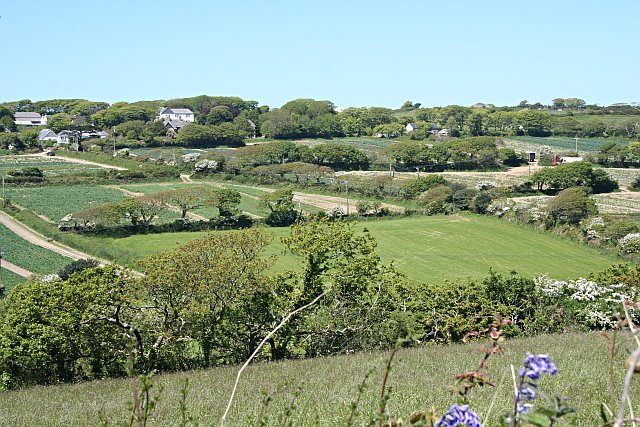
Looking north to Menagissey

Menagissey is a hamlet in Cornwall, England, United Kingdom. It is half-a-mile south of Mount Hawke about three miles (5 km) north-northeast of Redruth in the civil parish of St Agnes. It is included in the Mount Hawke and Portreath division on Cornwall Council.

It consists of cottages, bungalows and several farms above a steep valley.
