= Goonbell =

Hamlet in Cornwall, England

Coordinates: 50°18′14″N 5°11′38″W

Goonbell: Cornish: Goonbell
- Hamlet
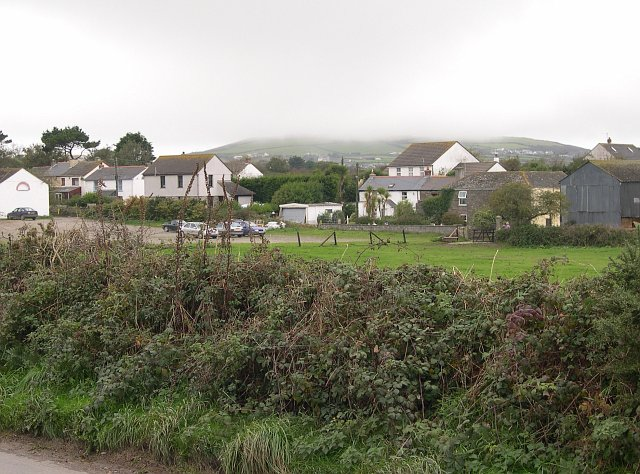

- Location within Cornwall
- Unitary authority: Cornwall
- Region: South West
- Country: England
- Sovereign state: United Kingdom
- Police: Devon and Cornwall
- Fire: Cornwall
- Ambulance: South Western

Goonbell (Cornish: Goonbell, meaning distant moorland) is a hamlet near St Agnes (where the 2011 census population was included) in Cornwall, England. The place name was Goen Bell in 1735, and Goonbell 1826. It is from the Cornish for far moor, goon + pell.

Goonbell is located east of the now defunct St Agnes railway station, a stop on the Truro and Newquay Railway. Goonbell itself had a halt on the same line.
