= Wheal Rose =

Village in Cornwall, England

Coordinates: 50.25°N 05.21°W

- Location within Cornwall
- OS grid reference: SW7144
- Shire county: Cornwall
- Region: South West
- Country: England
- Sovereign state: United Kingdom
- Post town: Redruth
- Postcode district: TR16
- Police: Devon and Cornwall
- Fire: Cornwall
- Ambulance: South Western
- UK Parliament: Camborne and Redruth

Wheal Rose is a village in Cornwall, England, United Kingdom, in the Redruth and St Agnes parishes.

== History and antiquities ==
North-west of Wheal Rose are the remains of an Iron Age building, a terraced field system, and an excavation pit. It was also used during the Roman period from 43 to 410 AD.

== Cornish wrestling ==
Cornish wrestling tournaments, for prizes, were held in Wheal Rose in the 1800s.

== Religion ==
Wheal Rose had a Bible Christian chapel.

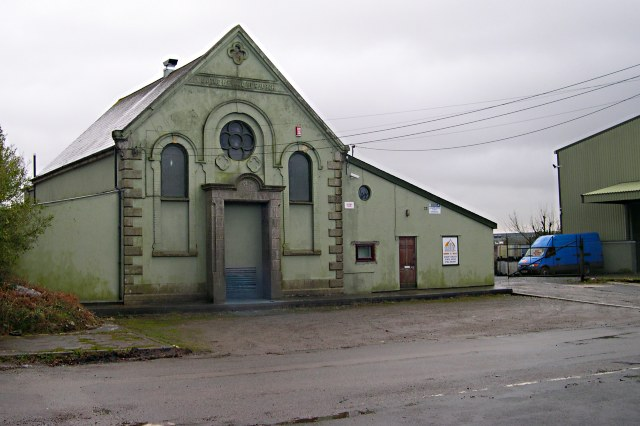
An old Methodist chapel, Wheal Rose
