= Goonhavern =

Village in Cornwall, England

Coordinates: 50.342°N 5.111°W

Goonhavern: Cornish: Goonhavar
- Location within Cornwall
- Civil parish: Perranzabuloe
- Unitary authority: Cornwall Council
- Ceremonial county: Cornwall
- Region: South West
- Country: England
- Sovereign state: United Kingdom
- Post town: TRURO
- Postcode district: TR4
- Dialling code: 01872
- Police: Devon and Cornwall
- Fire: Cornwall
- Ambulance: South Western

Goonhavern (Cornish: Goonhavar) is a village in Cornwall, England, in the civil parish of Perranzabuloe. It is located along the A3075 road, about two miles east of Perranporth.

As well as a village store and post office, a garden centre and several campsites, there is a public house named 'The New Inn' in the centre of the village. Until recently, a model village was a visitor attraction beside the B3285 southeast of Goonhavern. A traditional village show is held in the community hall in July, with prizes awarded for the local produce, flower arrangements, art, craft and photography.

The name Goonhavern comes from the Cornish words goon, meaning 'downs', and havar, meaning 'summer fallow land'.

== History ==
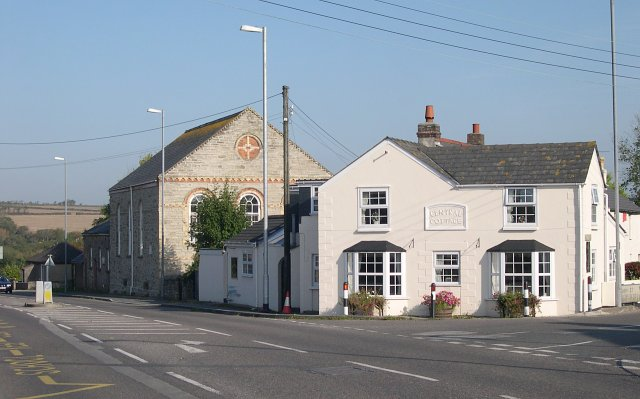
The Methodist church and a house called "Central Cottage" on the main road to Newquay

A railway branch-line to Perranporth and St Agnes ran through Goonhavern from 1905 but the line was closed as part of the Beeching cuts and today there is little sign of its route through the village centre.

On 12 July 1940, during the Battle of Britain, three bombs were dropped on Rosehill Farm near Goonhavern, killing a bullock.

=== Cornish wrestling ===
Goonhavern has hosted Cornish wrestling tournaments for prizes in venues such as the field by the New Inn.

John Collings (1783-1869) from St Minver was a celebrated wrestler in his early life. He also had a famous wrestling brother called Thomas. He lived at Porteath.
