= Perrancoombe =

Hamlet in the United Kingdom

Coordinates: 50.331°N 5.161°W

Perrancombe: Cornish: Kommperan
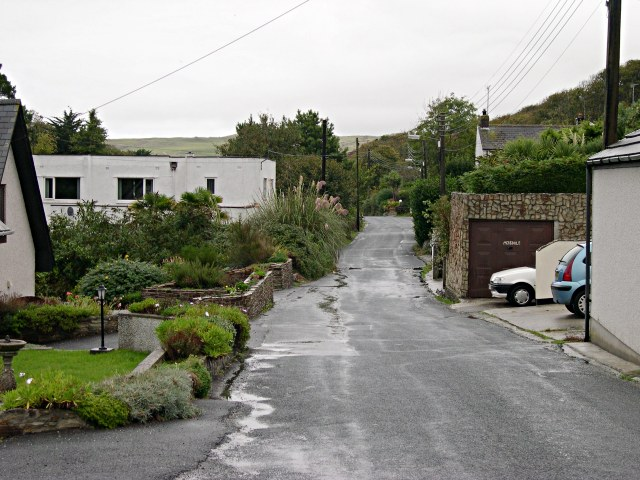
- Perrancoombe

- Location within Cornwall
- OS grid reference: SW751527
- Unitary authority: Cornwall
- Ceremonial county: Cornwall
- Region: South West
- Country: England
- Sovereign state: United Kingdom
- Post town: PERRANPORTH
- Postcode district: TR6
- Dialling code: 01872

Perrancoombe (Cornish: Kommperan) is a hamlet near Perranzabuloe in Cornwall, England. The name Perrancoombe comes from the Cornish language words Peran or Saint Piran, and komm, meaning 'small valley' or 'dingle'.
