= Perranzabuloe =

Hamlet and civil parish in England

Perranzabuloe: Cornish: Peran yn Treth
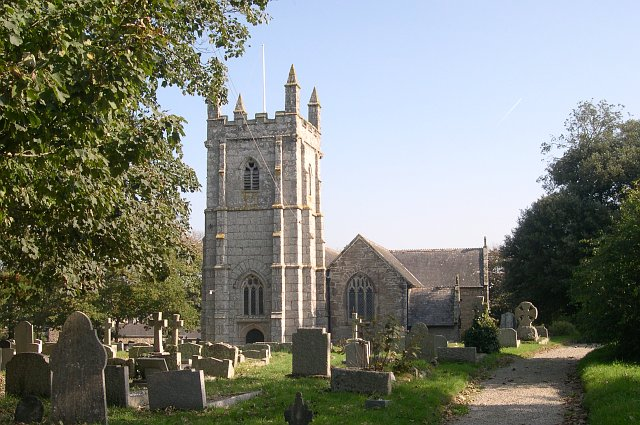
- Perranzabuloe parish church

- Location within Cornwall
- Population: 5,406 (Civil Parish, 2011 including Barkla Shop, Callestick and Goonhavern)
- OS grid reference: SW 770,520
- Civil parish: Perranzabuloe
- Unitary authority: Cornwall
- Ceremonial county: Cornwall
- Region: South West
- Country: England
- Sovereign state: United Kingdom
- Post town: TRURO
- Postcode district: TR4
- Dialling code: 01872
- Police: Devon and Cornwall
- Fire: Cornwall
- Ambulance: South Western
- UK Parliament: Truro & Falmouth

Perranzabuloe (/ˌpɛrənˈzæbjəloʊ/; Cornish: Peran yn Treth) is a coastal civil parish and a hamlet in Cornwall, England. Perranzabuloe parish is bordered to the west by the Atlantic coast and St Agnes parish, to the north by Cubert parish, to the east by St Newlyn East and St Allen parishes and to the south by Kenwyn parish. The hamlet (containing the parish church) is situated just over a mile (2 km) south of the principal settlement of the parish, Perranporth; the hamlet is also seven miles (11 km) south-southwest of Newquay. Other settlements in the parish include Perrancoombe, Goonhavern, Mount and Callestick. The parish population was 5,382 in the 2001 census, increasing to 5,486 at the 2011 census.

The name of the parish derives from the medieval Latin Perranus in Sabulo meaning Piran in the sand. It refers to Saint Piran (the patron saint of Cornwall) who founded an oratory church in the seventh century near the coast north of Perranporth. In medieval times the parish of Perranzabuloe was a peculiar of Exeter Cathedral. Perranzabuloe at that time exercised ecclesiastic control of St Agnes: the latter's church was a chapelry of Perranzabuloe. In 1846 St Agnes became a separate ecclesiastical parish.

== St Piran's Round ==
St Piran's Round is a circular defended late prehistoric enclosure, later used as a plen-an-gwary, one of only two remaining.

== Churches ==
=== St Piran's Oratory and Old Church ===
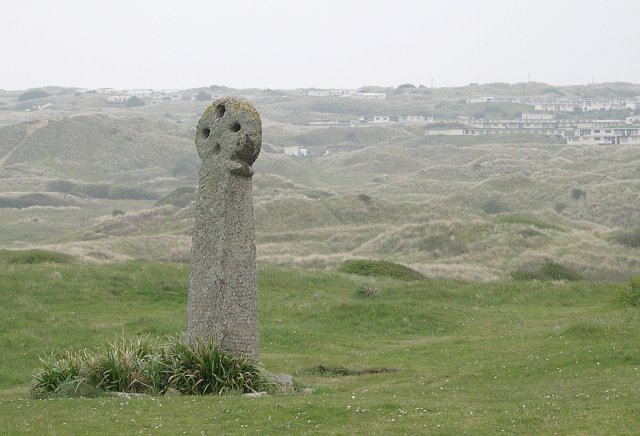
St Piran's Cross

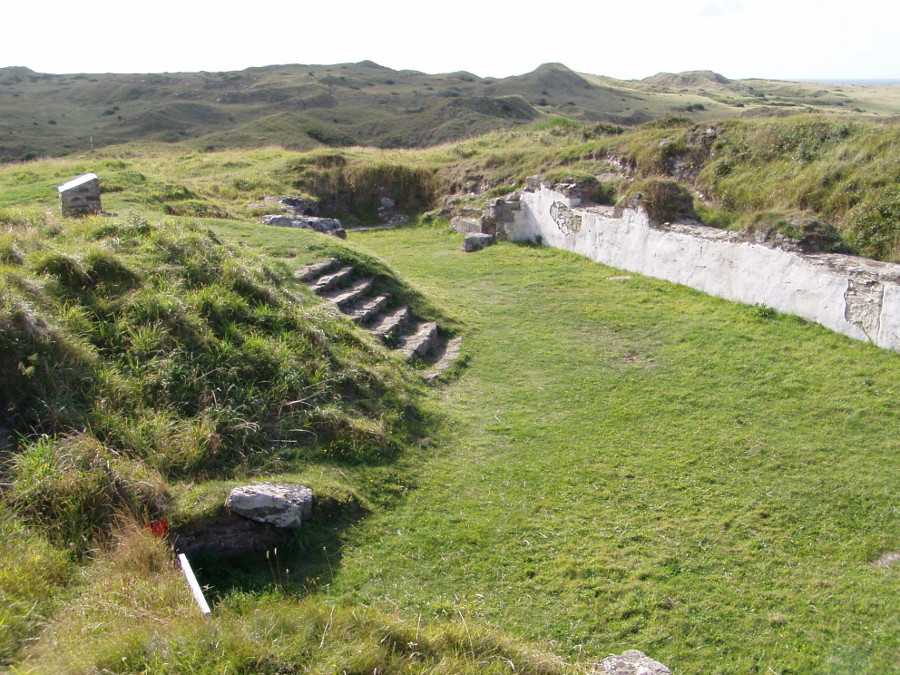
Remains of the old parish church

The site of the oratory of St Piran is in the extensive dunes known as Penhale Sands. Legend has it that St Piran landed on Perran beach from his native Ireland and built the oratory in the Irish style. The structure revealed in 1835 was well preserved, lacking only its roof – however it was almost immediately vandalised, and subsequent misguided attempts at preservation resulted in considerable loss to the ancient fabric. The entirely stone-built high-gabled oratory was a very simple double square in plan and is just 30 feet (9.1 m) long externally, 25 by 12 feet internally. The interior was lit only by a small opening 8 inches above the stone altar where a headless skeleton was found, believed to be the saint himself. Three carved stone 'Celtic' heads, of a man, woman, and cat that originally surrounded the points of the cable-framed, decorated, round-headed lofty portal arch are in the care of the Royal Cornwall Museum following nineteenth-century vandalism.

Stepping down the three steps from the narrow south portal, a timber screen once separated the sanctuary from the square nave surrounded on the three remaining sides; north, west and south, by a foot-wide stone bench. A further narrow 'priests door' gave access directly into the sanctuary from the eastern gable.

The interior was apparently almost entirely unlit apart from two tiny openings, and the absence of timber finds on the waterlogged site suggest the roof may have been constructed as a drystone corbelled vault in the early western-Atlantic ecclesiastical tradition found from Ireland to Brittany – see for example the better preserved Gallarus Oratory in Ireland or the late medieval Dupath Well. Later medieval 'holy-well' architecture across Cornwall, Devon and Brittany often follows the earlier Celtic Christian corbelled drystone tradition and early Celtic reliquaries record how early high-gabled religious houses may once have looked.

Local community groups have established a fund for re-excavation of the site which began in early 2014.

The encroachment of the sand led to the oratory's abandonment in the 10th century. The noted 17th-century antiquary Richard Carew wrote:

St Piran too well brooketh his name in Sabuloe: for the sand carried up by the north wind from the seashore daily continueth covering and marring the land adjoinant, so as the distress of this deluge drove the inhabitants to remove their church. Howbeit when it meeteth with any crossing brook, the same (by a secret apathy) restraineth and barreth his farther encroaching that way. It was in consequence of this notion that the inhabitants, thinking such situation secure, removed their church only about 300 yards, it being on the opposite side of the brook.

When the oratory was abandoned, another church (now known as St Piran's Old Church, 50°21′57.04″N 5°8′2.88″W) was built nearby on the inland side of the stream. As mentioned by Carew (above) it was thought the stream would protect the church from encroachment by sand. This proved to be the case for several hundred years and the church, completed by the 12th century, was enlarged in 1462. However, mining for tin caused the stream to dry up and eventually the church was engulfed by the dunes. The last service was held in 1795 after which the old church was partially dismantled and the materials used to build a new church inland. However, the old church's graveyard was used for burials until 1835 before sand enveloped it.

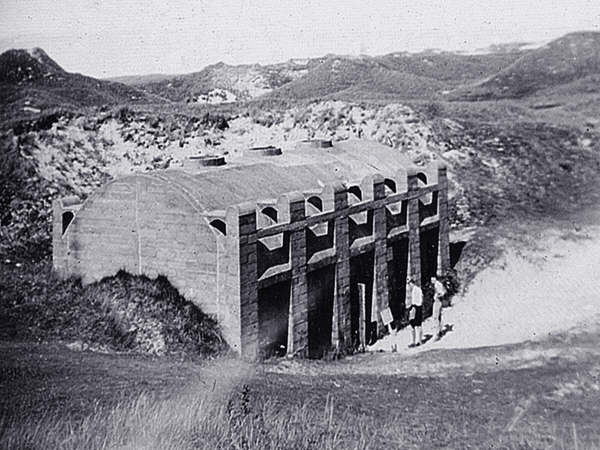
The Oratory in 1952 under a protective shell that was built before the sand was allowed to rebury it

The oratory site was excavated in 1910 but the remains of the stone building are now buried in the sand again. The site of St Piran's Old Church and the 10th century cross next to it was excavated in 1919.

St Piran's Cross (believed to be the earliest recorded stone cross in Cornwall) stands in the dunes between the oratory site and the graveyard of the old church. It is dedicated to tinners and miners and stands 8 feet (2.4 m) high. Arthur Langdon suggested that the shaft had once been ornamented but the ornament had not survived because of the poor quality of the granite.

In Norman times there was also a monastery (known as Lanpiran or Lamberran) near the oratory site but it was disendowed c1085 by Robert of Mortain. The relics of St Piran were preserved in St Piran Old Church which became a centre of pilgrimage. The relics are recorded in an inventory made in 1281 and were still venerated in the reign of Queen Mary I according to Nicholas Roscarrock's account.

=== Parish Church ===
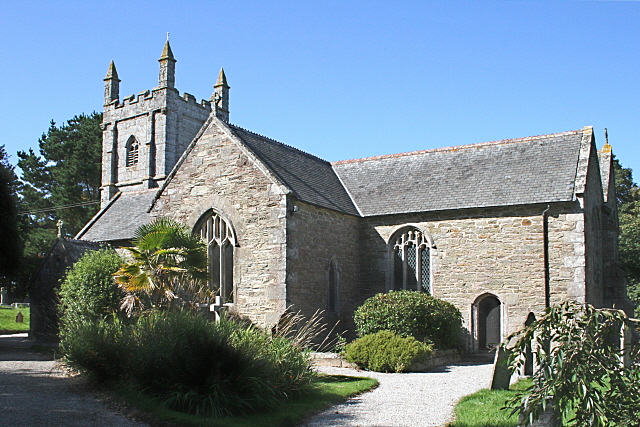
The parish church of St Piran

The present parish church is situated in Perranzabuloe hamlet at grid reference SW 770,521. It was dedicated to St Piran in July 1805. Much of the structure is built of materials retrieved from St Piran's Old Church. Perranzabuloe church has a chancel and nave, a south aisle, and north and south transepts. One of the aisles is known as the Chyverton aisle and housed a pew belonging to the notable local family. The three-stage tower is battlemented, pinnacled and houses a ring of three bells. On 5 August 1878 there was a service by the Bishop of Truro, to re-open the church following a renovation with new pews and a ″wagon-headed″ roof for the chancel, to divide it from the nave.

== St Piran's Day events ==
St Piran's Day is celebrated on 5 March. The main event in the parish is a march across the dunes to St Piran's Cross. Thousands of people attend, generally dressed in black, white and gold, and carrying Saint Piran's Flag, generally known as the flag of Cornwall. A play of the Life of St Piran, spoken in Cornish, has been enacted in recent years at the event. Daffodils are also carried and placed at the cross.

Perran Feast is traditionally celebrated in Perranzabuloe Parish on the last Monday in October by Perranzabuloe Old Cornwall Society. On the Sunday before, both the Old Cornwall Society and the Anglican Church in Perranzabuloe parish commemorate St Piran. There is a pilgrimage to the site of St Piran's Oratory in the afternoon and a service in the parish church of St Piran in the evening.

== Chiverton ==
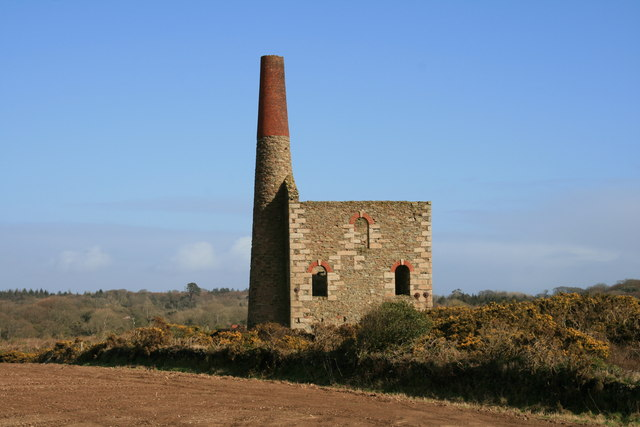
Batters' Shaft, West Chiverton mine

Southwest of Zelah but in Perranzabuloe parish is Chyverton House and its grounds. Nearby was a notable lead mine called West Chiverton Mine which produced 45,100 tons of lead ore in the period 1859–86. There were seven more less successful mines which also included "Chiverton" in their names. West Chiverton Mine had an 80-inch pumping engine; in 1870 it had a workforce of 1000 and a main shaft over 700 ft deep but the mine closed in 1886.

St Piran's well at Perranwell was demolished (before 1925) and the stones removed to Chiverton. According to tradition it was a cure for rickets.

== Charter of Tywarnhayle ==
The Charter of Tywarnhayle by King Edgar granted land to Eanwulf in 960 AD.

== Notable people ==
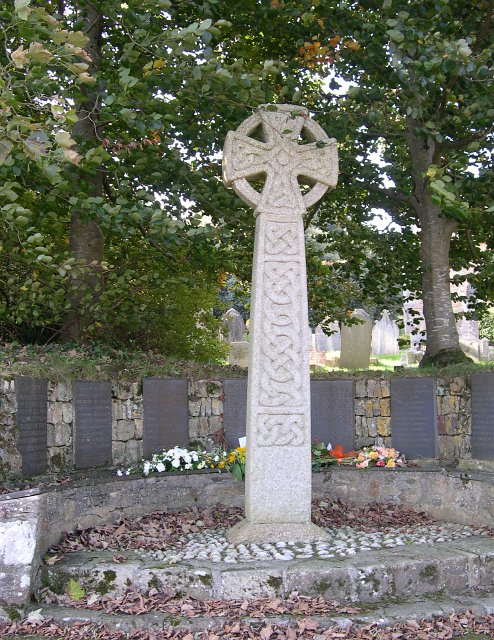
Perranzabuloe war memorial

- May Brothers, Frederick (1840–1897) and Alfred May (1851–1920), engineers in South Australia
- William Kitto (1855–1930), Captain of the Foxdale Mines
- Ralph Dunstan (1857-1933), musician, buried in the churchyard
- Donald Healey (1898–1988), rally driver, automobile engineer, speed record holder, born in the parish
