= Perranporth =

Village in Cornwall, England

Coordinates: 50.3437°N 5.1546°W

Perranporth: Cornish: Porthperan
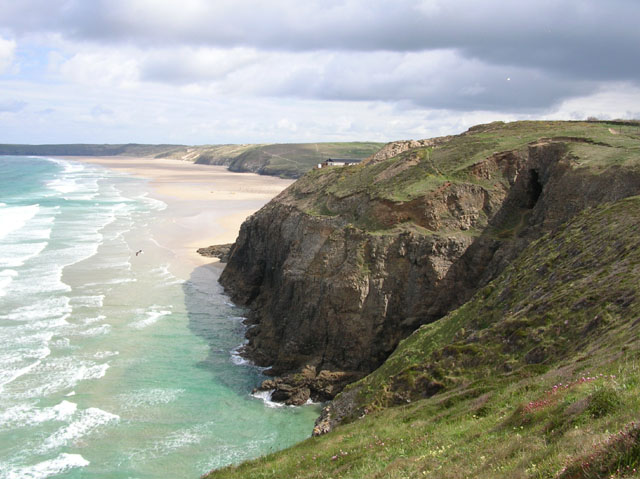
- Perran Beach from Droskyn Point

- Location within Cornwall
- Population: 3,066
- OS grid reference: SW756540
- Civil parish: Perranzabuloe
- Unitary authority: Cornwall
- Ceremonial county: Cornwall
- Region: South West
- Country: England
- Sovereign state: United Kingdom
- Post town: Perranporth
- Postcode district: TR6
- Dialling code: 01872
- Police: Devon and Cornwall
- Fire: Cornwall
- Ambulance: South Western
- UK Parliament: Camborne & Redruth

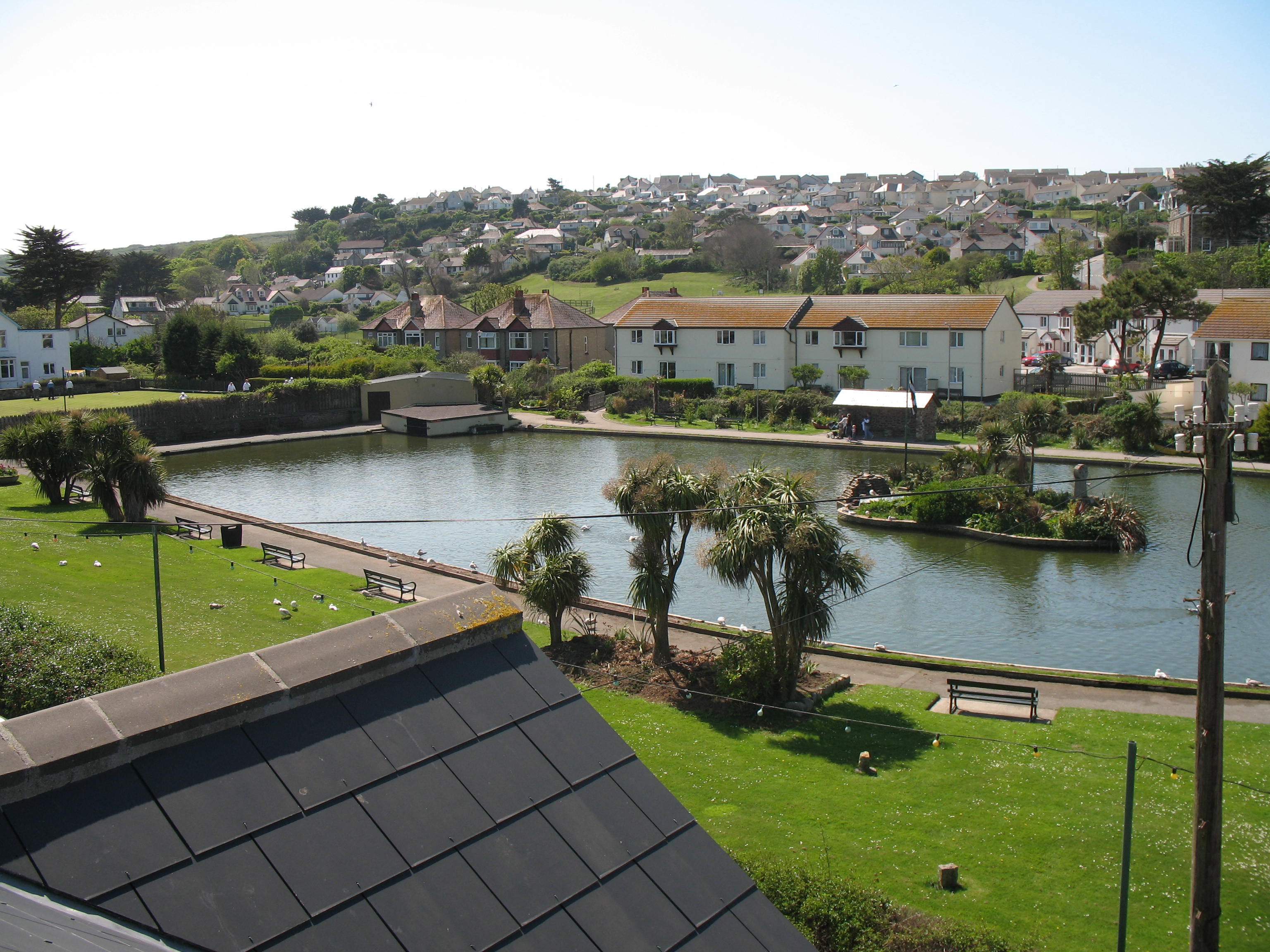
Perranporth Boating Lake

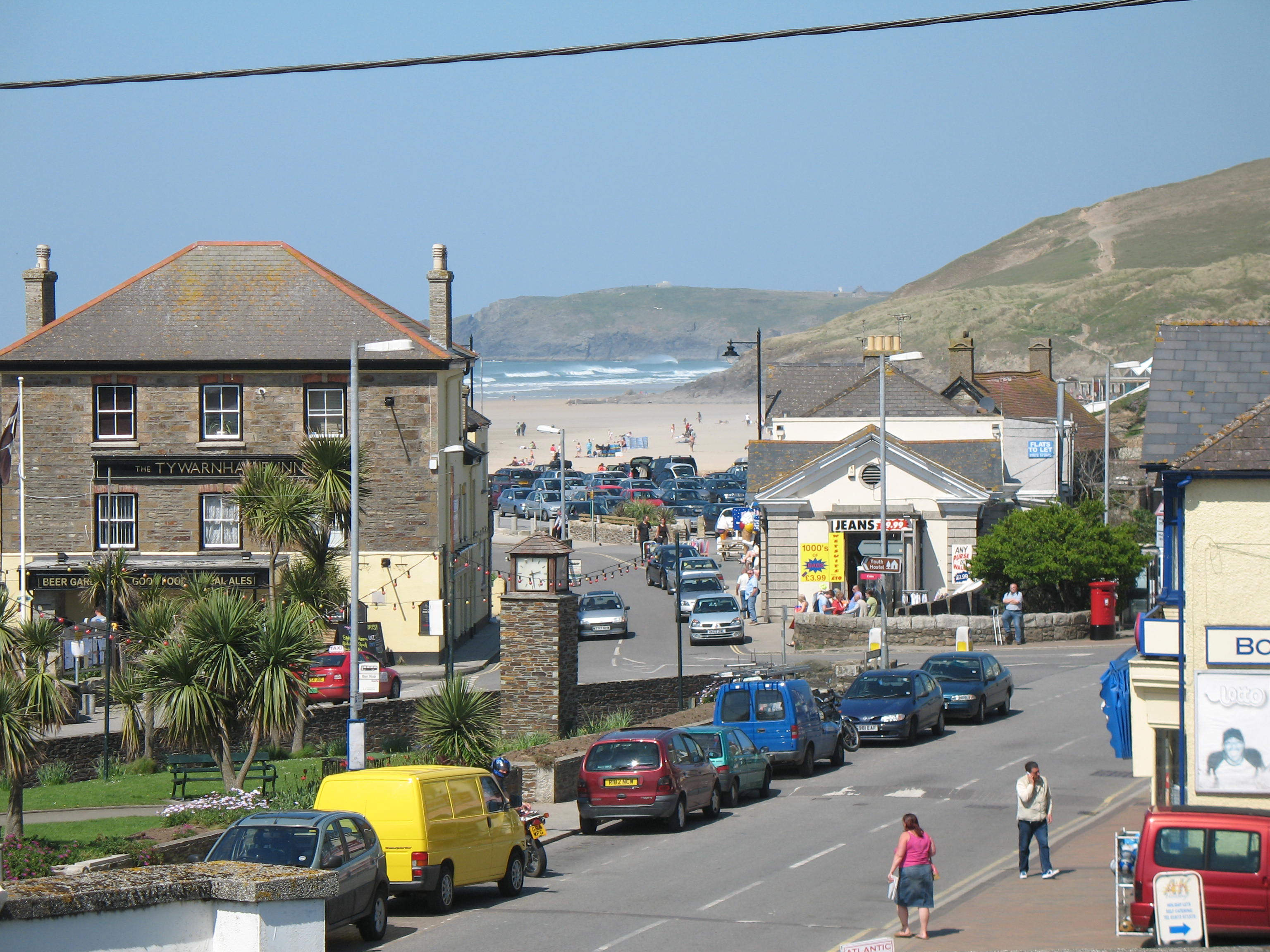
Perranporth town centre, with the beach in the background

Perranporth (Cornish: Porthperan) is a seaside resort town on the north coast of Cornwall, England, United Kingdom. It is 2.1 miles east of the St Agnes Heritage Coastline, and around 7 miles south-west of Newquay. Perranporth and its 2 miles (3 km) long beach face the Atlantic Ocean. It has a population of 3,066, and is the largest settlement in the civil parish of Perranzabuloe. It has an electoral ward in its own name whose population was 4,270 in the 2011 census.

The town's modern name comes from Porth Peran, the Cornish for The Cove of Saint Piran who is the patron saint of Cornwall. He founded the St Piran's Oratory on Penhale Sands, near Perranporth, in the 7th century. The Oratory was buried under sand dunes for many centuries, being unearthed in 1835.

== History ==
John Woodward (1688–1728) recorded that iron ore was mined from a large vein on the beach. In the 1860s ore was moved up the cliff by a 'puffer' engine. It was then transported from Gravel Hill Mine, at the north end of Perran Beach, to a quay on the Gannel.

The ship Voorspoed ran ashore in a northerly gale in Perran Bay on 7 March 1901 whilst travelling from Cardiff to Bahia. The wreck was one of the last to be looted.

From 1903 Perranporth was served by a railway line. Built as the Truro and Newquay Railway, the line ran from Chacewater to Newquay and the principal intermediate stop was Perranporth station. Perranporth also had a second station, known as Perranporth Beach Halt. The line closed in the 1960s

Perranporth Airfield, built during World War II as an RAF fighter station, is now a civil airfield. It is located at Cligga Head, on the plateau above the cliffs.

== Geography ==
Perranporth is centred on a main street, St Piran's Road, part of the B3285 Newquay to St Agnes road. The town centre has various shops, cafés and pubs. The long-distance South West Coast Path runs past the town. There is a long-distance coach service provided by National Express (service 316) which runs between London and Perranporth.

Perranporth is a popular family holiday destination. A wide sandy beach, Perran Beach, extends northeast of the town for about approximately 2 miles (3.2 km) to Ligger Point. The beach faces west onto Perran Bay and the Atlantic Ocean and is a popular surfing location. There are lifeguard beach patrols from May to September and the beach is generally safe for bathing, although there are dangerous rip currents around Chapel Rock at ebb tides. Perran Sands is a sprawling holiday camp and caravan site to the north of the town centre.

At the south end of the beach are cliffs with natural arches, natural stacks and tin-mining adits. There is a youth hostel above the cliffs at Droskyn Point. Nearby is the 19th-century Droskyn Castle, formerly a hotel and now divided into apartments.

=== Protected areas ===
Perran beach is backed by extensive sand dunes which reach nearly a mile inland. Known as Penhale Sands, the dunes are used for orienteering competitions, and there is an 18-hole links golf course.

The far northern end of the beach is used as a naturist beach, although the Ministry of Defense discouraged naturism in the sand dunes that bordered their property.

The dunes are also a valuable resource for wildlife, with many rare plants and insects including Cornwall's largest colony of the silver-studded blue, a Red Data Book species.

Southwest of Perranporth, the coast becomes more rocky, with cliffs rising to about 300 feet (90 metres) at Cligga Head. These cliffs form the Cligga Head SSSI (Site of Special Scientific Interest), noted for its geological and biological characteristics.

== Annual events ==
- The "Perranporth Shout" Sea-song and Shanty Festival is held over the third weekend in April, with performers from as far away as Scotland and Norway. It has expanded over the last nine years to be a three-day, five venue occasion. In 2016 the name was changed to 'The Loudest Shout', in recognition of the new event on the Friday night when up to 60 singers take part in a mass singing session.
- Perranporth used to host an inter-Celtic festival each October, Lowender Peran, drawing people in from Cornwall and the other five Celtic nations. The festival moved to nearby Newquay when the hotel that hosted it closed in 2015.
- Perranporth SLSC holds an Extreme Surf Triathlon every September that involves a swim in Perranporth Sea, followed by a cycle on the hills around Perranporth, then finished with a 'painful' run around the dunes and cliffs including Flat Rocks.
- Perranporth's Annual "Tunes in the Dunes" music festival features artists such as Tom Walker, Craig David and Fatboy Slim. The festival is held on the sand dunes of Perranporth.

== Places of worship, associations and clubs ==
The parish church, which is in the Anglo-Catholic tradition of the Church of England, is in Perranzabuloe. An Anglican chapel of ease in Perranporth dedicated to St Michael opened in 1872 and seats 100 people.

The town also has its own Roman Catholic church, dedicated to Christ the King, on Wheal Leisure Road, which is part of the Diocese of Plymouth. Dom Charles Norris completed stained glass windows for the church of Christ the King.

== Sport ==
Surfing is popular in Perranporth with its long sands and beach break. The beach is a destination for kite surfing enthusiasts. There is a golf club, Perranporth Golf Club, just north of the town, while the football team Perranporth A.F.C. play in Division One West of the South West Peninsula League. There is a rugby club, "The Brewers", and a tennis club.

=== Cornish wrestling ===
Perranporth has held Cornish wrestling tournaments, for prizes in venues for included the field next to the Perranporth Tennis Club.

See also Cornish wrestling at the Perran Round.

== Notable people ==
- Donald Healey (1898–1988), a motor engineer and designer, opened the first garage/petrol station in the town in 1919
- Winston Graham (1908–2003), author who lived in Perranporth for 34 years and whose Poldark novels are based on the area.
- Geoffrey Healey (1922–1994), automotive engineer, son of Donald Healey
- Andrew Graham (born 1942), political economist, son of Winston Graham
- Judy Inglis (1952–2003), artist known for her oil paintings and her draughtsmanship.
