= TR postcode area =

Postcode area within the United Kingdom

Truro
- Postcode area
- Coordinates: 50.208°N 5.249°W
- Country: United Kingdom
- Postcode area: TR
- Postcode area name: Truro
- Post towns: 15
- Postcode districts: 28
- Postcode sectors: 68
- Postcodes (live): 12,101
- Postcodes (total): 15,303
- Statistics as at May 2020

The TR postcode area, also known as the Truro postcode area, is a group of 27 postcode districts in South West England, within 15 post towns. These cover west Cornwall, including Truro, Penzance, Camborne, Falmouth, Hayle, Helston, Marazion, Newquay, Penryn, Perranporth, Redruth, St Agnes, St Columb and St Ives, plus the Isles of Scilly.

== Coverage ==
The approximate coverage of the postcode districts:

Postcode district	Post town	Coverage	Local authority area(s)
TR1	TRURO	Truro	Cornwall Council
TR2	TRURO	Gerrans, Probus, St Mawes, Tregony, Truro, Veryan, West Portholland	Cornwall Council
TR3	TRURO	Truro, Perranwell Station, Feock, Playing Place, Ponsanooth, Stithians	Cornwall Council
TR4	TRURO	Blackwater, Frogpool, Goonhavern, Trispen	Cornwall Council
TR5	ST. AGNES	St Agnes, Mithian	Cornwall Council
TR6	PERRANPORTH	Perranporth, Bolingey, Perrancoombe	Cornwall Council
TR7	NEWQUAY	Newquay	Cornwall Council
TR8	NEWQUAY	Carland Cross, Mitchell, Quintrell Downs	Cornwall Council
TR9	ST. COLUMB	St Columb Major	Cornwall Council
TR10	PENRYN	Penryn	Cornwall Council
TR11	FALMOUTH	Falmouth, Flushing, Mylor Bridge, Constantine, Mawnan Smith	Cornwall Council
TR12	HELSTON	Helston, Mullion	Cornwall Council
TR13	HELSTON	Helston	Cornwall Council
TR14	CAMBORNE	Camborne, Kehelland, Penponds	Cornwall Council
TR15	REDRUTH	Redruth, Pool	Cornwall Council
TR16	REDRUTH	Lanner, Carharrack, Gwennap, St Day, Portreath, Four Lanes	Cornwall Council
TR17	MARAZION	Marazion	Cornwall Council
TR18	PENZANCE	Penzance	Cornwall Council
TR19	PENZANCE	Pendeen, St Buryan	Cornwall Council
TR20	PENZANCE	Ludgvan, Penzance, Praa Sands	Cornwall Council
TR21	ISLES OF SCILLY	St Mary's, Hugh Town	Council of the Isles of Scilly
TR22	ISLES OF SCILLY	St Agnes	Council of the Isles of Scilly
TR23	ISLES OF SCILLY	Bryher	Council of the Isles of Scilly
TR24	ISLES OF SCILLY	Tresco	Council of the Isles of Scilly
TR25	ISLES OF SCILLY	St Martin's	Council of the Isles of Scilly
TR26	ST. IVES	St Ives, Zennor	Cornwall Council
TR27	HAYLE	Hayle	Cornwall Council

The TR25 postcode district covered the smallest population in the UK as of the 2011 census.

== Map ==
TR postcode area map, showing postcode districts in red and post towns in grey text, with link to nearby PL postcode area.

== See also ==
- Postcode Address File
- List of postcode areas in the United Kingdom
- Extreme points of the United Kingdom
