= Cornish Parachute Centre =

UK parachuting centre and skydiving drop zone

Coordinates: 50.3279°N 5.1776°W

The Cornish Parachute Centre is a BPA affiliated parachuting centre and skydiving drop zone at St Agnes, Cornwall.

The centre opened in 2006 operating out of Perranporth Airfield. The centre provides student training in the Ram Air Progression System, Accelerated Freefall and Tandem skydiving.
