= Bawden Rocks =

Pair of islands in Cornwall, England

Coordinates: 50.334°N 5.232°W

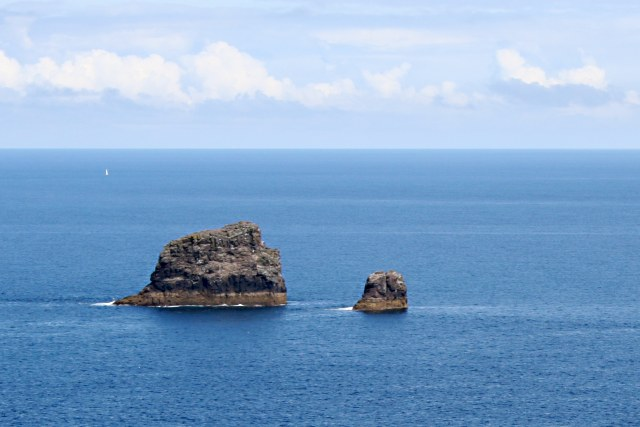
Bawden Rocks seen from the clifftop between St Agnes Head and Newdowns Head.

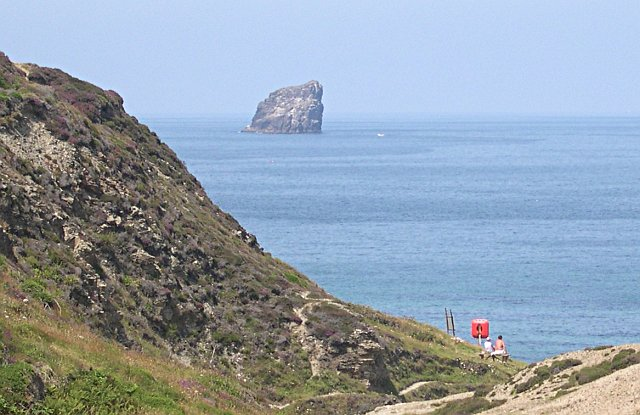
Bawden Rocks from Trevellas Coombe

Bawden Rocks (Cornish: Meyn Bodyn), also known as Man and His Man or Cow and Calf, are a pair of small islands approximately one mile north of St Agnes Head, off the coast of Cornwall, England. The larger of the two rocks stands around 80 ft (24 m) above the high water mark.

The rocks are popular with swimmers, divers, anglers and trawler fishermen, being home to a wide range of marine life. Sea anemones, molluscs and crustaceans of various types cling to the rock walls below the surface of the sea, together with marine animals such as the threatened broad sea fan.

The rocks are also a nesting ground for a number of seabird species, including razorbills, cormorants, guillemots, great black-backed gulls and puffins.

A local legend claims that the rocks were thrown out to sea by a child-eating giant called Bolster, after whom Bolster Day was named.
