= Wheal Coates =

Former tin mine in Cornwall, England

Wheal Coates Hwel Coates
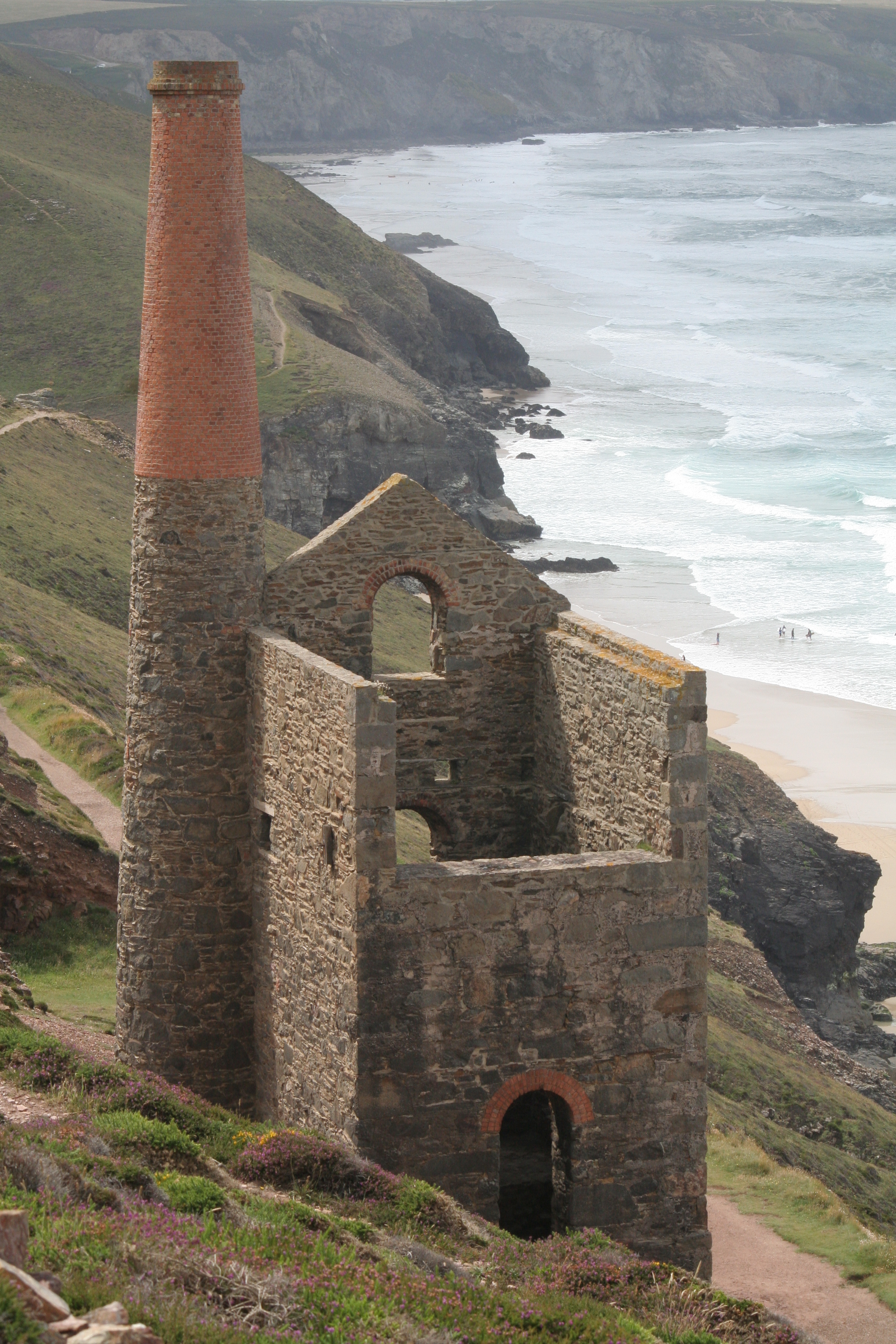
- Towanroath Shaft; Pumping Engine House

- Location in Cornwall
- Location: St Agnes, Cornwall, England; 50°18′14″N 5°13′55″W
- Products: Tin
- Opened: 1802
- Closed: 1889 (reworked 1911–1913)

Wheal Coates (Cornish: Hwel Coates) is a former tin mine situated on the north coast of Cornwall, UK, on the cliff tops between Porthtowan and St Agnes. It is preserved and maintained by the National Trust.

== History ==
Earliest records indicate a mine at the site since 1692. The present mine opened in 1802 and was closed in 1889 when the price of tin fell. It came into full production in 1815. Flooding and bringing ore to the surface were the main problems of the mine until steam-driven equipment was available, as the mine's underground operations extended for some distance under the sea. The mine was sold in 1844 and thereafter allowed to flood. A new owner reopened the mine in 1872 but work was sporadic until its 1889 closure. For some years, the yield was 20lb of tin per ton of ore. In 1906, new ownership hoped to work the mine for both tin and copper. Wheal Coates (Note: 'Wheal' is Cornish for 'place of work' or 'mine'. Another term for 'mine' is 'bal', as in 'bal maidens', the women who worked on the surface.) had produced a small amount of copper ore, more than a century earlier.

At the height of its production, 140 people were employed at the site to mine a seam of tin just below sea level but this and a subsequent period of operation from 1911–1913 were not very successful because tin production was sporadic. (Note: Some local people continue to believe there are rich tin ore deposits remaining in the area surrounding Wheal Coates.) The mine was closed permanently in 1914.

== Present day ==
The surviving buildings date from the 1870s when deep underground mining began at the site and were stabilised and preserved in 1986. There are three engine houses that formerly housed Cornish engines. Towanroath Pumping Engine House (1872) was used to pump water from the adjacent 600 ft Towanroath shaft. There are two Whim engine houses which were used to crush ore for processing. "Old Whim" was built in the mid 19th century, while "New Whim" was built in the late 19th century. A calciner dating from 1910–1913 when the mine was reopened, roasted the tin to remove impurities such as arsenic.

The surviving structures were all listed as Grade II buildings on 31 October 1988: The Stamps House, the chimney east of the New Whim engine house, the Old Whim and New Whim engine houses, the Towanroath engine house, and the calciner. Wheal Coates is part of the Cornwall and West Devon Mining Landscape World Heritage Site.

== Sources ==
- Ashley, Peter (2011). Cross Country: English Buildings and Landscape From Countryside to Coast. John Wiley & Sons. ISBN 9781119971054.
- Kent, Michael; Kent, Meryn (2008). Cornwall from the Coast Path. Alison Hodge Publishers. ISBN 978-0-9067-2068-4.
- "Special Correspondence: Camborne". The Mining Magazine. Vol. V, no. 4. October 1911.
- "Special Correspondence: Camborne". The Mining Magazine. Vol. VI, no. 4. April 1912.
- "Special Correspondence: London". Mining and Scientific Press. Vol. XCIII, no. 25. Dewey Publishing Company. 22 December 1906. p. 736.
- Jago, Frederick William Pearce (1882). The Ancient Language and the Dialect of Cornwall: With an Enlarged Glossary of Cornish Provincial Words. Truro: Netherton & Worth.
