= Porthtowan =

Village in Cornwall, England

Coordinates: 50.28234°N 5.23682°W

Porthtowan: Cornish: Porthtewyn
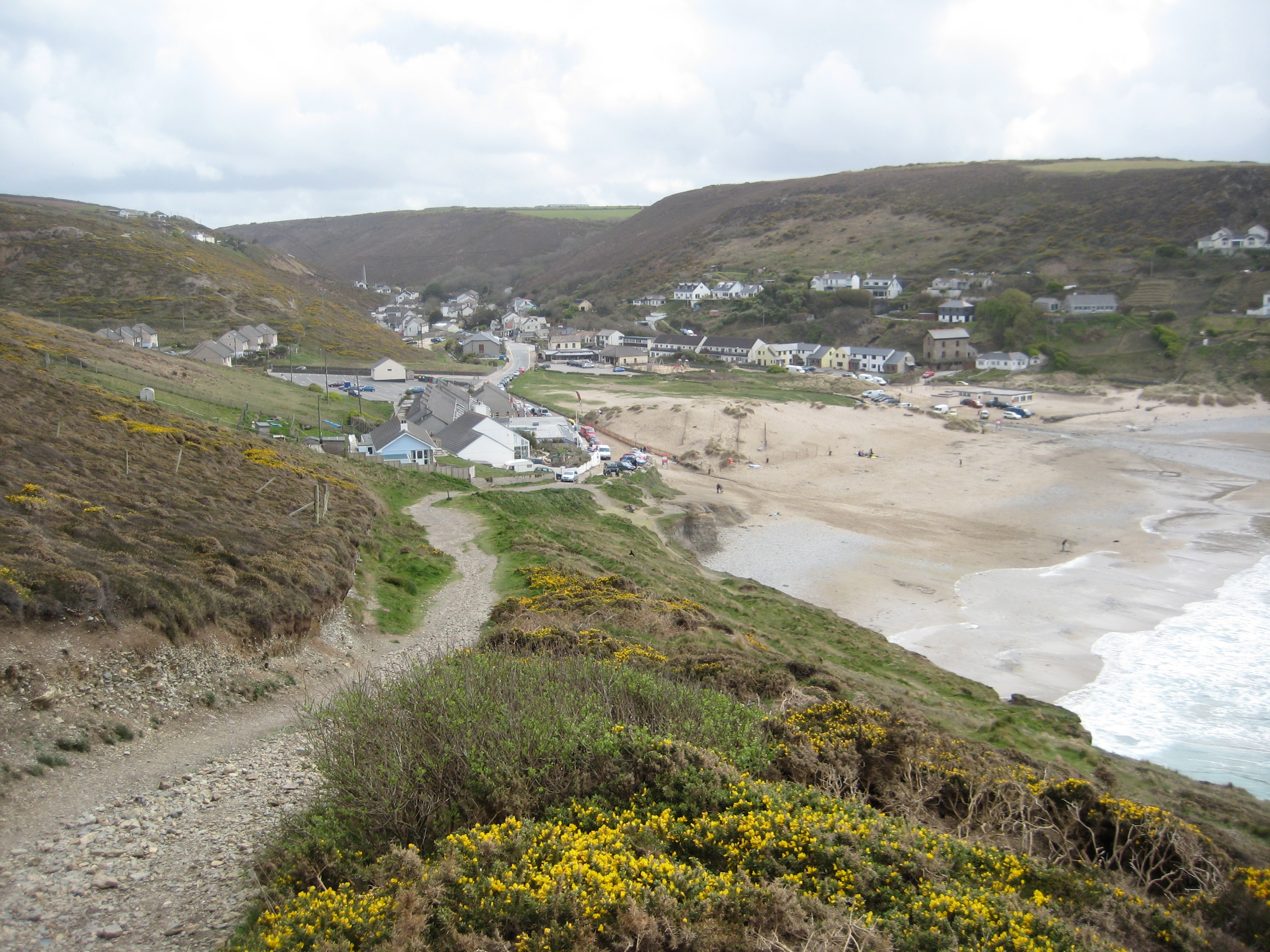
- Porthtowan

- Location within Cornwall
- OS grid reference: SW695475
- Unitary authority: Cornwall
- Ceremonial county: Cornwall
- Region: South West
- Country: England
- Sovereign state: United Kingdom
- Post town: St Agnes
- Postcode district: TR4
- Police: Devon and Cornwall
- Fire: Cornwall
- Ambulance: South Western

Porthtowan (Cornish: Porthtewyn, meaning landing place at the sand dunes) is a small village in Cornwall, England, UK, which is a popular summer tourist destination. Porthtowan is on Cornwall's north Atlantic coast about 3.5 km (2.2 mi) southwest of St Agnes, 6 km (3.7 mi) north of Redruth, 16 km (9.9 mi) west of Truro and 24 km (15 mi) southwest of Newquay in the Cornwall and West Devon Mining Landscape, a World Heritage Site.

Porthtowan is popular with surfers and industrial archaeologists; former mine stacks and engine houses dot the landscape. It lies on the South West Coast Path.

== Geography ==
Porthtowan lies along the 627-hectare (1,550-acre) Godrevy Head to St Agnes heritage coast, which is located on the north Cornwall coast of the Celtic Sea in the Atlantic Ocean. It lies between Godrevy Head (with the Godrevy Towans) and St Agnes Head, north of the village of St Agnes. The Godrevy to St Agnes Heritage Coast has been a nationally designated protected area since 1986. The marine site protects 40 species of mammals and amphibians.

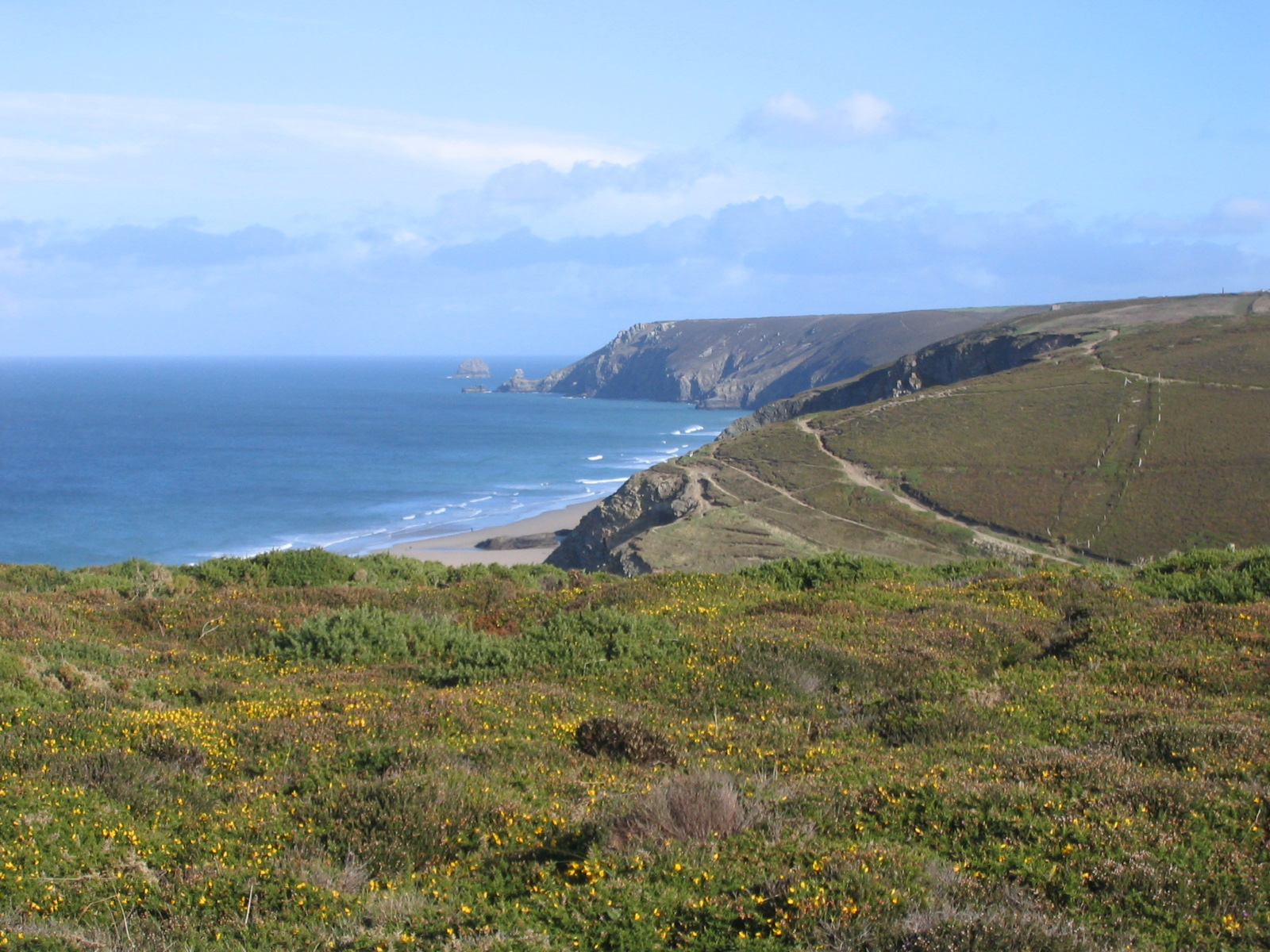
Porthtowan Cliffs seen from West Cliff by R. Spence

Porthtowan is within walking distance of National Trust coastal and cliff-side walks. Between Porthtowan and Agnes Head is one of Cornwall's "largest remaining heathland[s]." Ironically, the heath survived – and was not turned into arable land – because of the soil contamination of previous mining activities. Few plants or species other than heathers and spiders can thrive in the area's environmental condition. (Note: The land, now owned by the National Trust, between St Agnes and Porthtowan was obtained in 1957 from Viscount Falmouth and others. It is 81.04 hectares (200.25 acres).)

== Toponymy ==
Its name comes from the Cornish words "porth" and "tewyn" to mean landing place at the sand dunes.

== History ==
Porthtowan's history is associated with mining and one of its most prominent buildings is a former engine house converted for residential use. Allen's Corn Mill operated at Porthtowan between 1752 and 1816.

Porthtowan owes much of its present-day character to its popularity as a local seaside resort in Victorian and Edwardian times when the local populace from Redruth and the surrounding areas went there, particularly on Bank Holidays.

== Mining ==
Coastal settlements in Cornwall between Perranporth and Porthtowan had copper, lead, iron, tin and zinc mines. Porthtowan mines mainly produced copper.

=== South Wheal Towan ===
The South Wheal Towan copper mine also operated in the area. Still visible is its Echo Corner mine stack. The mine had a slide lode that intersected with the main lode, Hamptons and Downright lode. In addition to copper pyrites, brown iron ore was also found in the mine.

=== Tywarnhayle Mine ===
The Tywarnhayle mine was opened in 1826 as United Hills Mine but the name was changed in 1848 to Tywarnhayle Mine. It was an important source of copper ore until about 1860. Its engine house, Taylors Shaft, is visible in the hills surrounding the coastal village.

The mine was located about 1 kilometre southeast of Porthtowan. It was the United Hills Mine on 3 February 1830 when an engine boiler exploded and killed nine people. In 1906, money was invested to drain and work the Tywarnhayle mine. Water was piped out by Cornwall's first electrical centrifugal pumps, made by Worthington Simpson, at the rate of 1,000 gallons per minute. The amount of copper ore mined between 1826 and 1906 was 86,800 tons.

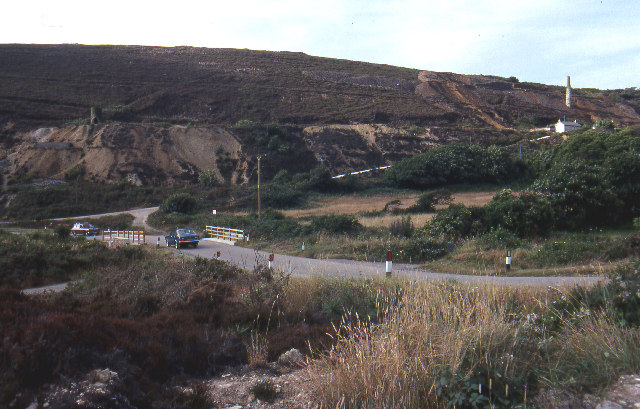
Tywarnhayle mine. This disused mine and its extensive spoil tip is on the north valley side, about 1 km south east of Porthtowan.

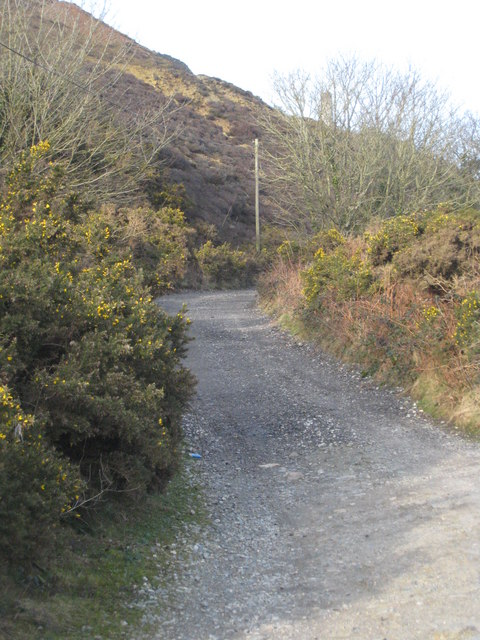
Footpath leading to Mount Hawke from Tywarnhayle Mine

=== Tywarnhayle Stannary ===
In Cornwall the mining industry had its own judicial system. Tywarnhayle was one of the four stannaries. There were three others: Blakemore, Foweymore and, lastly, Kerrier and Penwith. The Stannaries managed mining law, taxation, court proceedings and jails.

=== Wheal Coates ===
The mine is renowned for its pseudomorphs, in this case tin oxide, or cassiterite, that takes on the shape of the feldspar crystals that it replaces within granite.

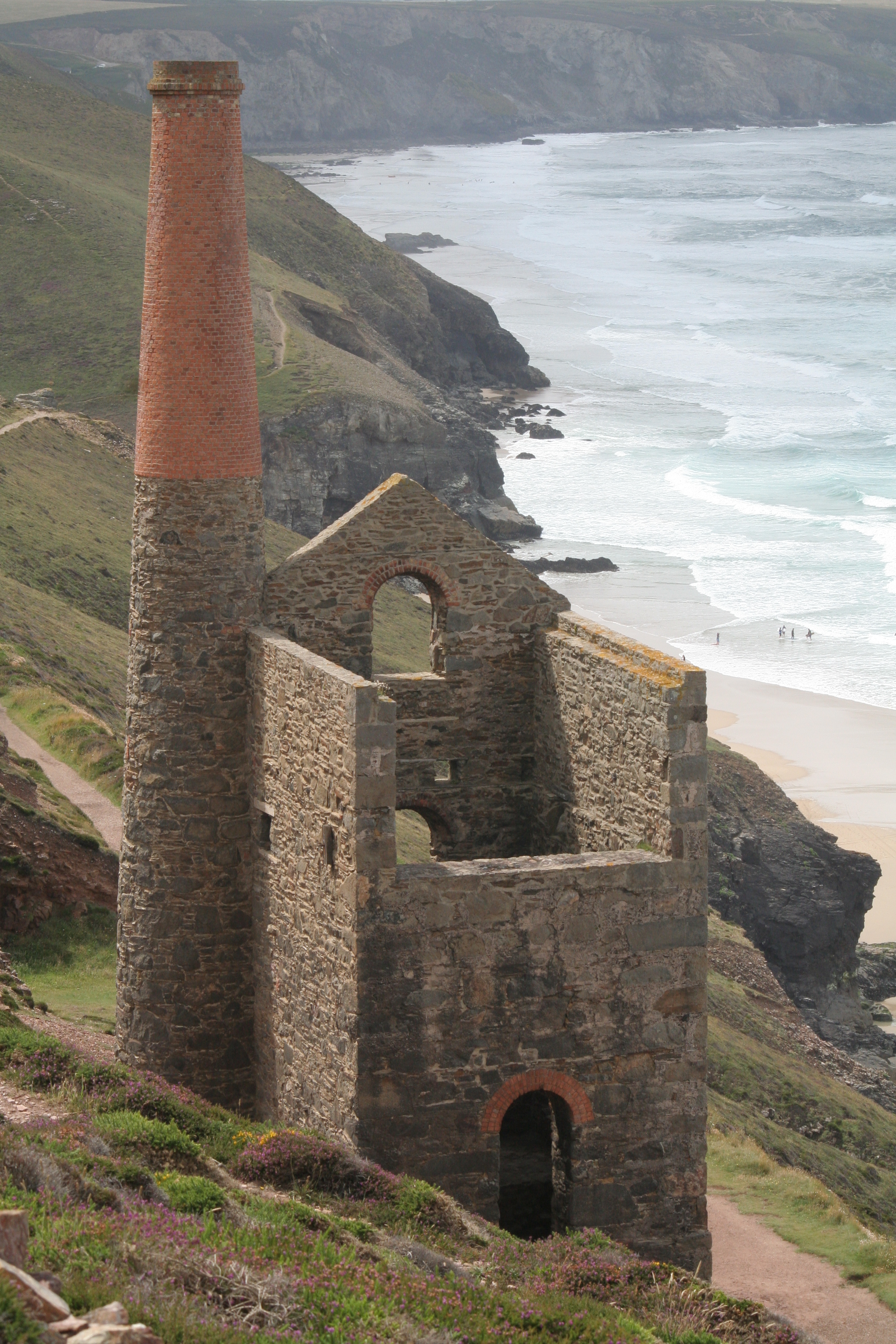
Wheal Coates

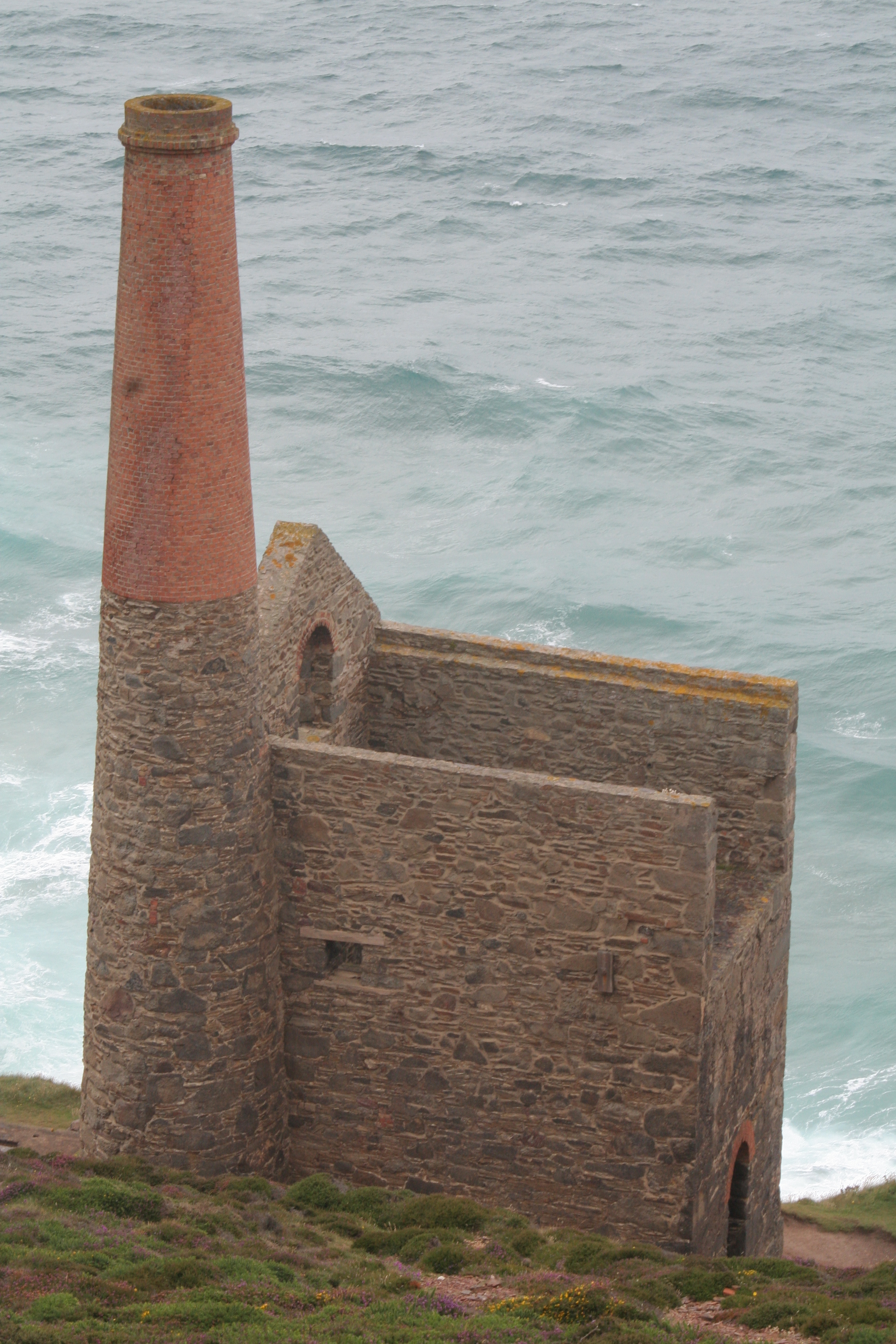
Wheal Coates

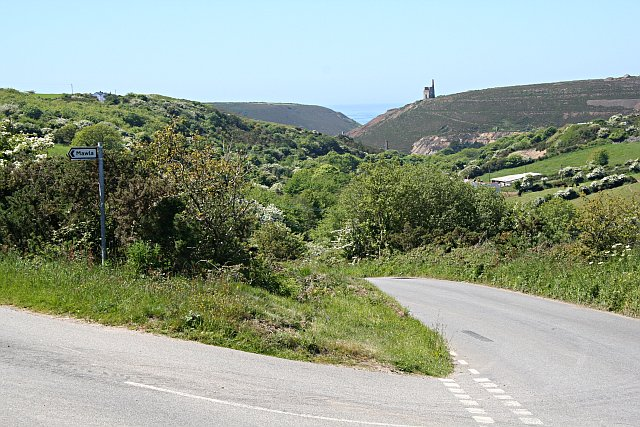
Road Junction. One road leads down into the steep valley which reaches the sea at Porthtowan. On the hillside in the distance is a lone engine house from an old mine.

=== Wheal Ellen ===
Wheal Ellen was a 19th-century copper mine. Remains of the mine are visible. It operated primarily from 1826 to 1862.

=== Wheal Lushington ===
Wheal Lushington, also known as the New Wheal Towan, was a copper mine located on a hill overlooking the beach. The engine house that was built in 1872 was never used as an engine house and has since been converted for other uses.

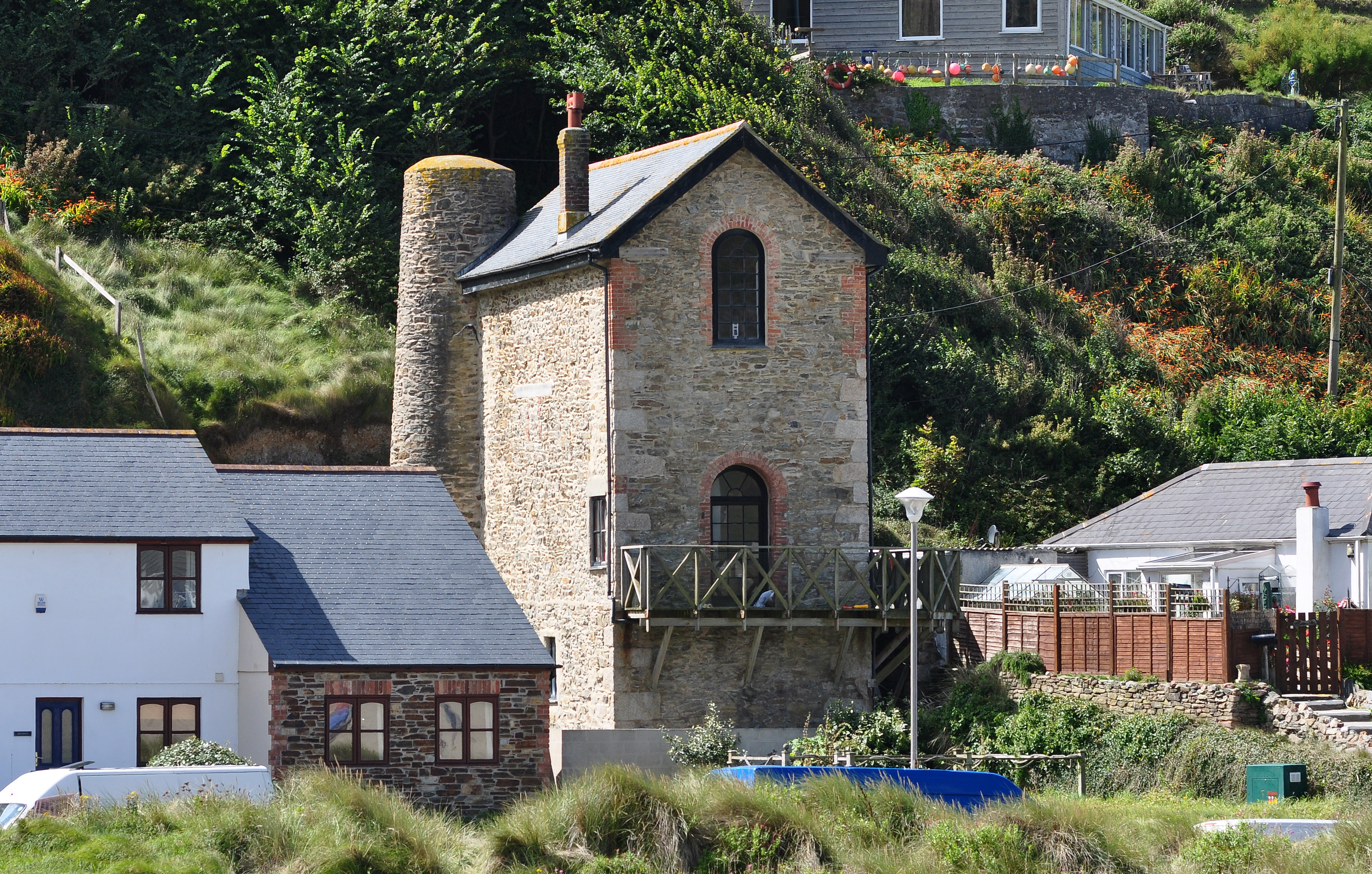
The former Wheal Lushington engine house which has been converted into a café

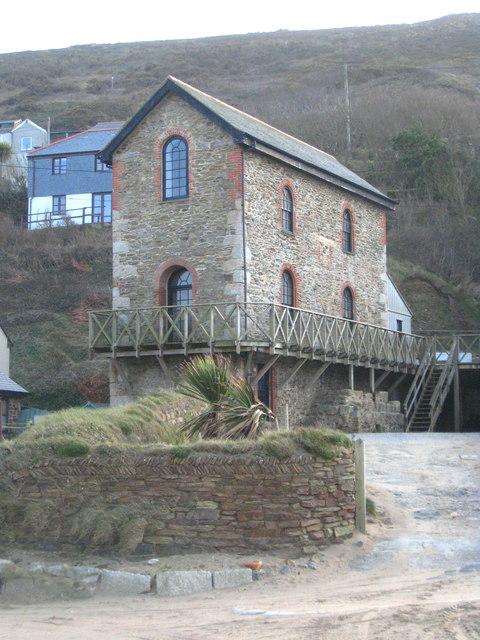
Engine house behind Porthtowan beach now converted into a dwelling house

=== Wheal Towan ===
Wheal Towan was one of Cornwall's most prolific 18th century copper mines. In 1772, women and girls worked at the mines, earning 4 to 6 d per day. In 1809 Wheal Towan had a cobbing shed which was a building used to break the ore up with a pointed hammer weighing up to four pounds. Teenage girls (bal maidens) sat on low benches and broke the ore to remove the rock and break the ore into small pieces. It was a loud and difficult task, but not as difficult as bucking which came next; this required the ore to be broken down into a powder or granules with a flat-ended cast iron hammer.

Sometime before 1826 the mine resulted in £130,000 profit, having been mined to a depth of 150 fathoms. It was then closed until 1826. Two 80-inch cylinder steam engines called Wilson's engine from the engineer Samuel Grose (1791–1866) were used in 1826 to drain the mine. The monthly output between January 1827 and March 1828 from the engine ranged from 48.9 to 84.2 million 94 pound bushels.

It was also known as West Wheal Towan (1850–1867), Lelant Wheal Towan and West Wheal Lucy (1872). During the period he owned it, the mine provided Thomas Daniell (1715-1793) with an income estimated at the time as a "guinea a minute". His son Ralph Allen Daniell acquired the Trelissick estate, but in 1835 his son Thomas was declared bankrupt.

The first underground steam engine was built in Wheal Towan in 1785. It was reopened in 1872 as West Wheal Lucy and abandoned soon after.

The only remains on the surface are burrows created from the mine's operations. The burrows head in the direction of Towan Cross.

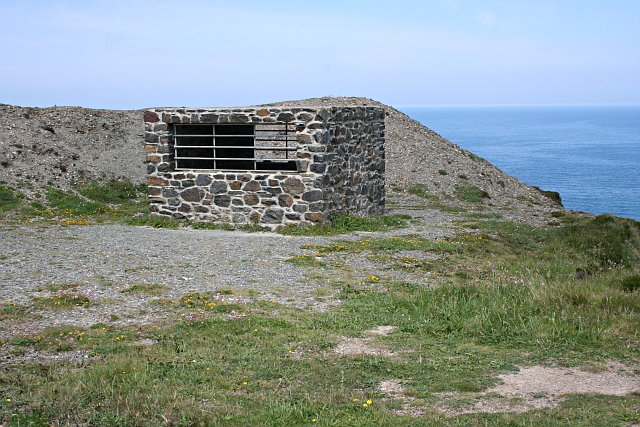
Kites Shaft mineshaft cover, West Wheal Towan mine

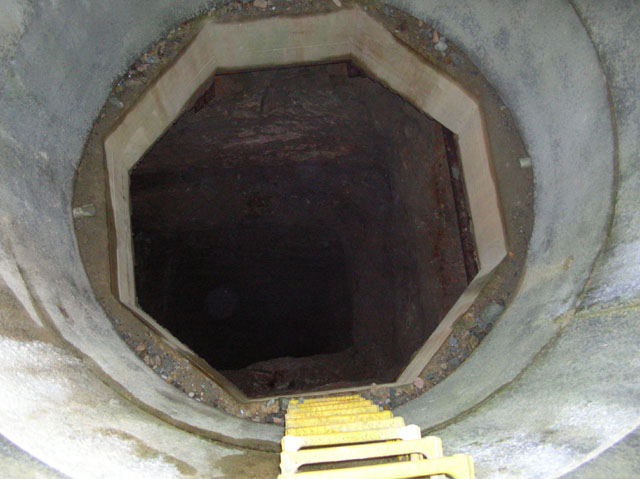
Kites Shaft (disused), a typical old Cornish mine shaft; it has been boxed and had new fittings round the top for public safety

== Religion ==
Porthtowan has a Wesleyan chapel.

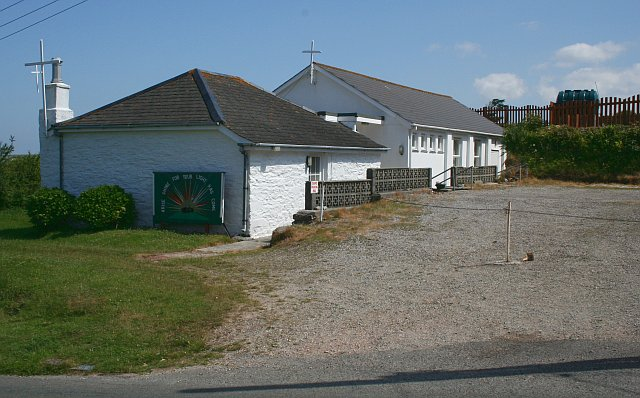
The Chapel on the Hill, Methodist Church, Porthtowan

== Culture and activities ==
=== Beaches ===
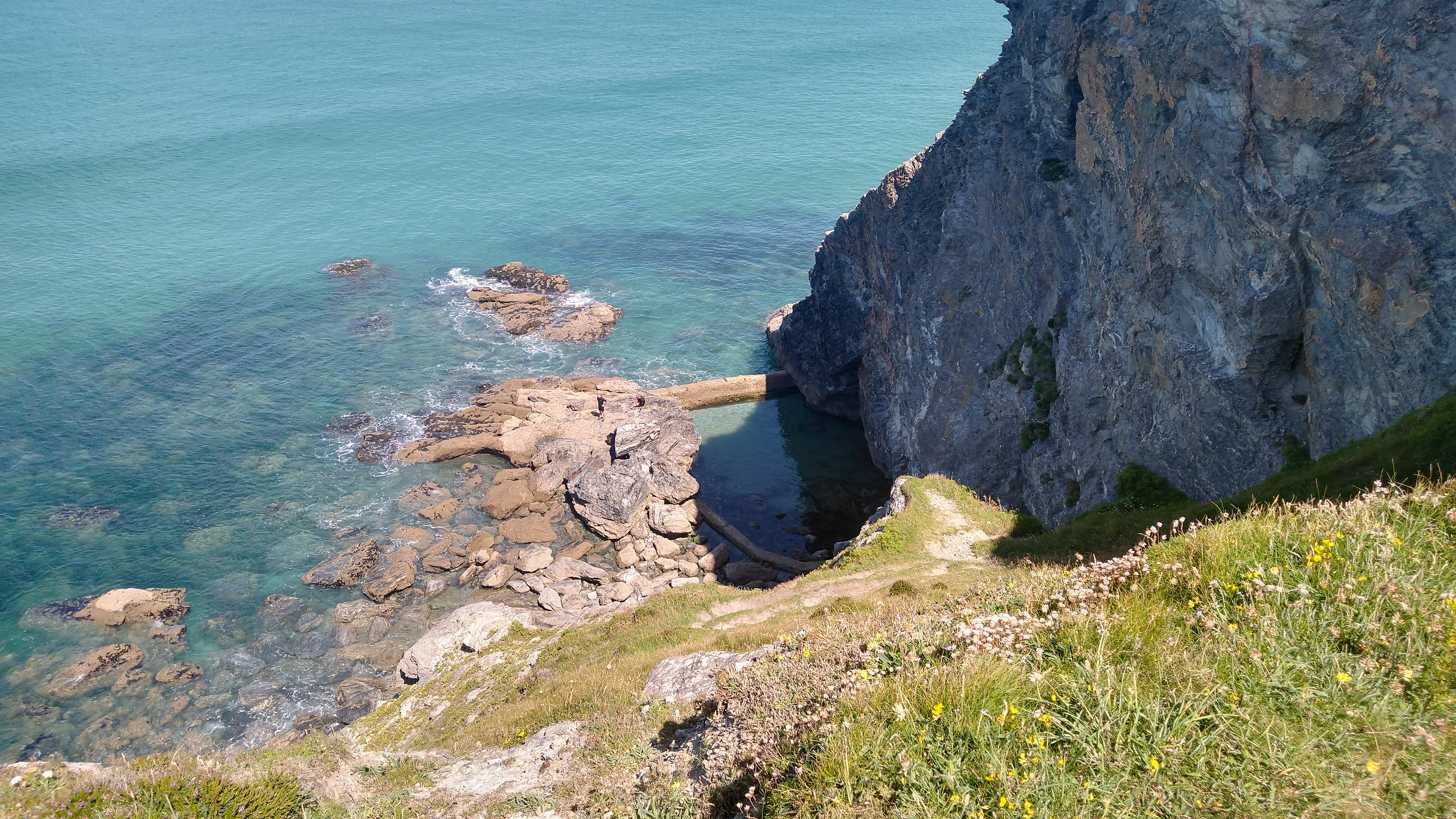
View of the Pool from the cliff showing where the step used to start. Taken at high tide

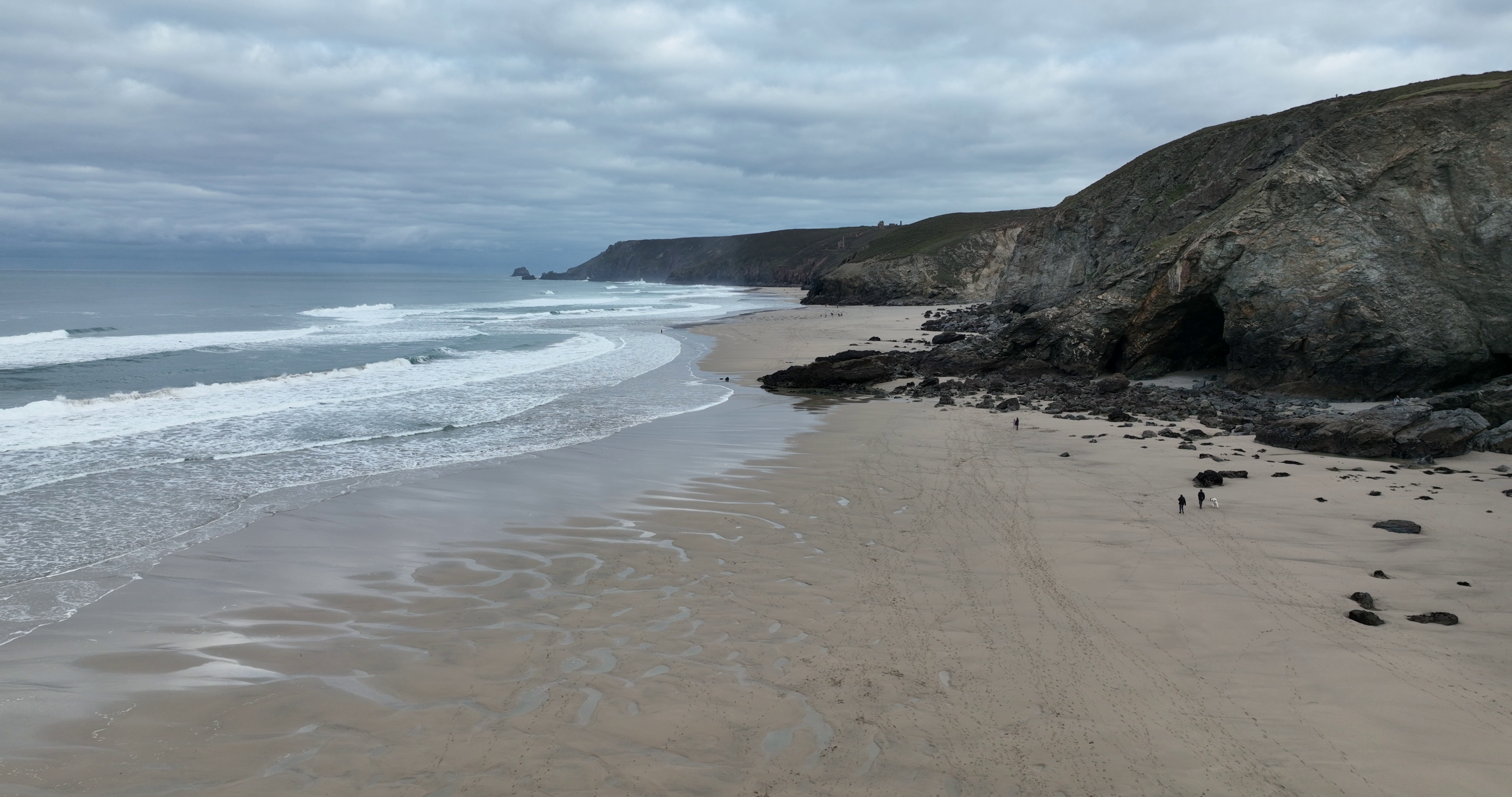
Porthtowan Beach on the north coast of Cornwall, England.

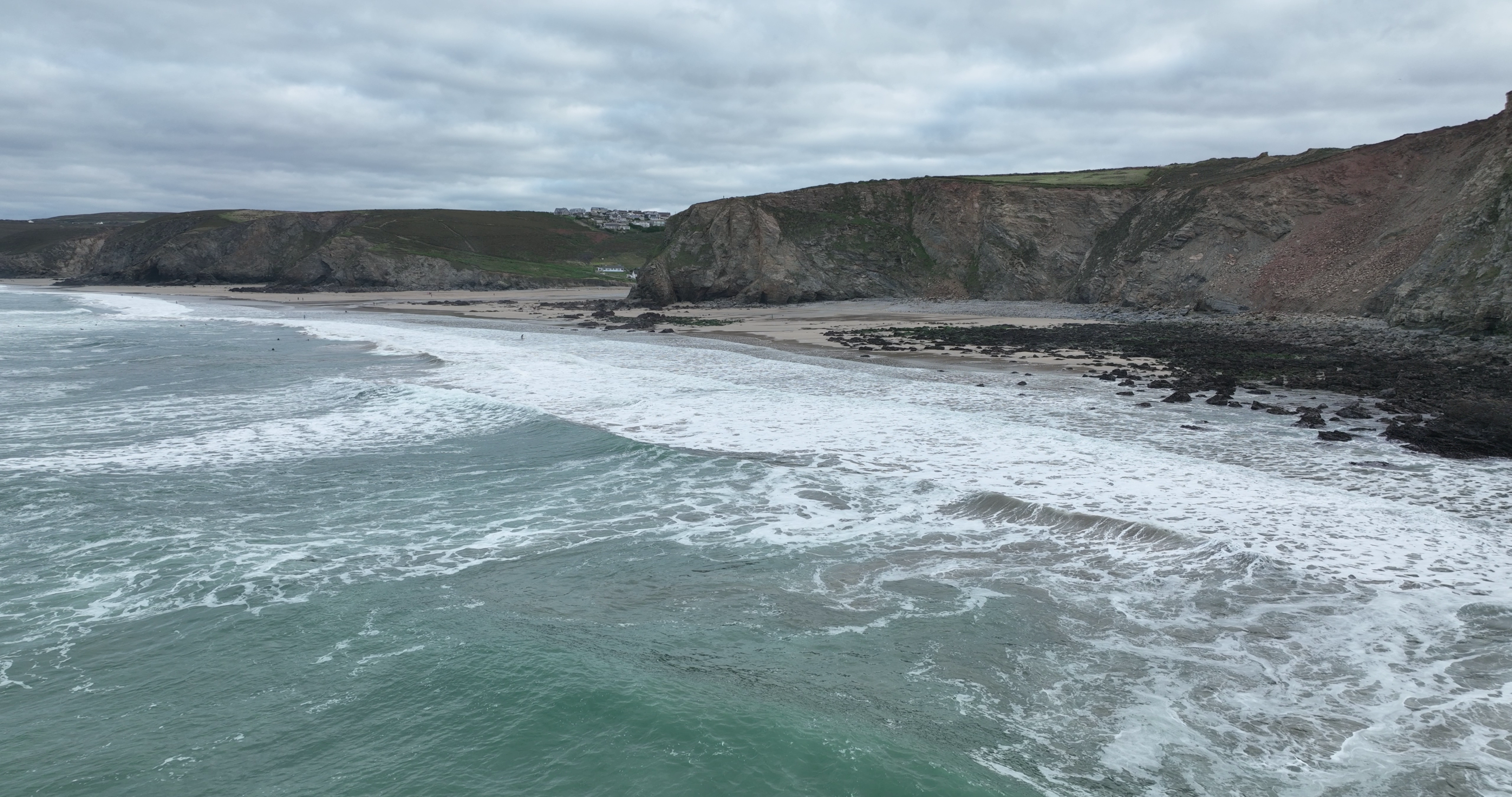
Lushington Beach near Porthtowan, Cornwall, England.

Porthtowan beach is a family and surfing Blue Flag beach. Designated Area of Outstanding Natural Beauty (AONB), along the coast are Gullyn Rock, Diamond Rock and sandstone and slate cliffs. It has more recently become well known as a surf resort and the surf club building. This is where the judges can be found for the annual SAS Rip Curl Cornish and Open Longboard Championship. The beach is kept under the constant scrutiny of the St Agnes based charity Surfers Against Sewage, which was founded in 1990 to improve water quality in Chapel Porth, Porthtowan, and Trevaunance beaches.

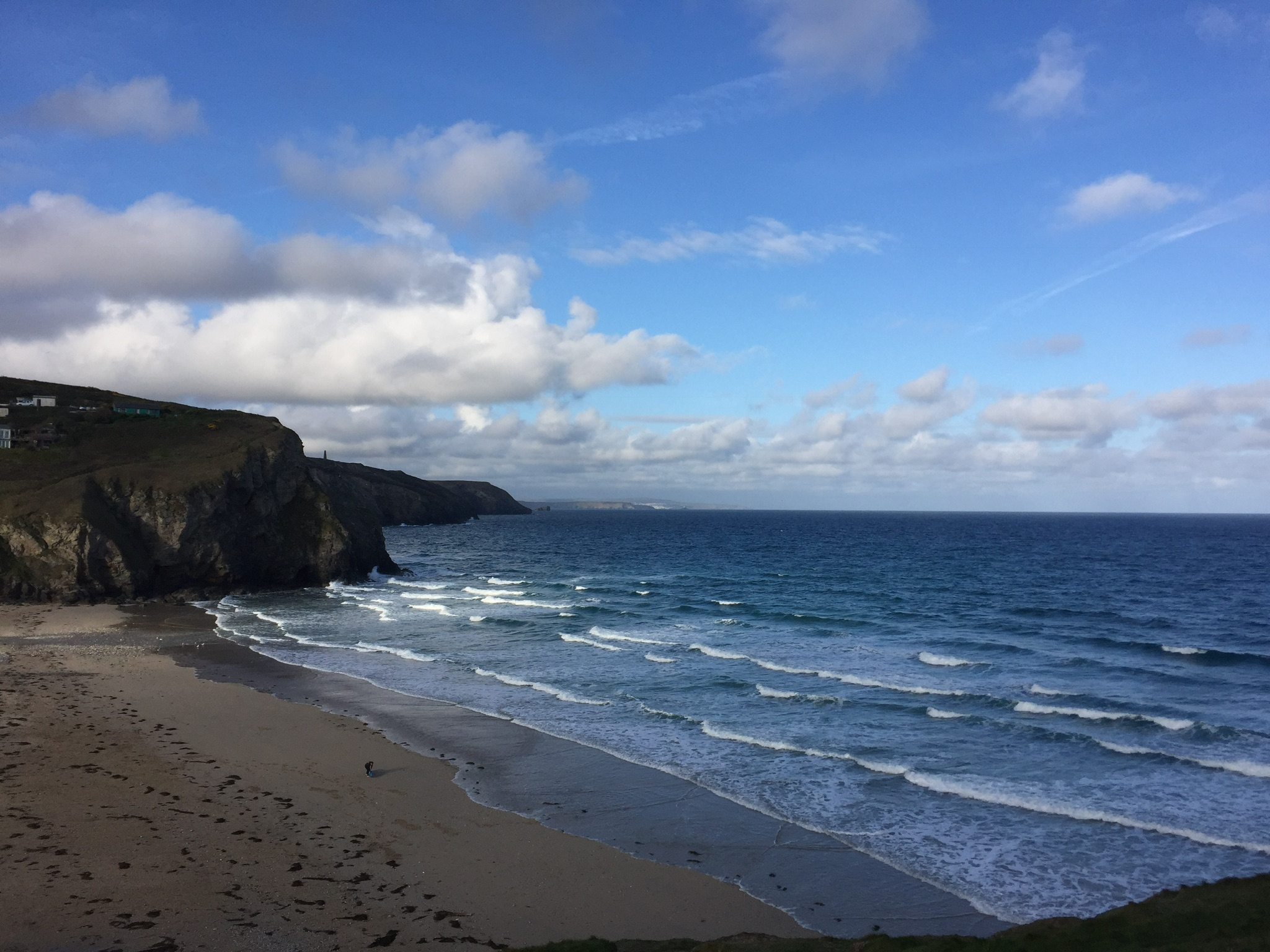
Porthtowan Beach from the East Cliff

Porthtowan also has a hidden tidal pool in the rocks and nestled up against the cliff. It is only accessible at low tide since the steps on the east cliff have fallen into disrepair.

=== Restaurants and pubs ===
The Unicorn pub is a beachside bar, eaterie, hotel and hostel, which offers live music, dj's and panoramic sunset views.

Overlooking the Porthtowan Beach is the Blue Bar, which has live music or disc jockeys on the weekend.

Porthtowan Beach Cafe is located on Beach Road, and serves breakfast and lunch, as well as evening feast nights. The cafe was opened in 2012 by Heather Anne Jones.

Moomaid of Zennor has an parlour serving ice cream made locally at Tremedda Farm near Zennor.

=== Amateur dramatics ===
An amateur theatre group, Porthtowan Players, formed in 1968, operates from a permanent stage facility within Porthtowan Village Hall. The group puts on a pantomime, musical theatre show, short plays and a youth production each year.

== Transport ==
There is a bus service within Cornwall by a number of operators. The major operators in the Cornwall area are First South West and Hopleys Coaches. Service runs through the village of St Agnes and other towns. Rail service is offered out of Newquay railway station, Redruth railway station, Truro railway station and other western Cornwall municipalities, which is connected with bus service through the Ride Cornwall and Plusbus programs.

Ferry service is available to the Isles of Scilly from Penzance; Padstow to Rock; and other locations. Air travel is available through Newquay Airport and private jets, charters and helicopters are served by Perranporth Airfield.

== In culture ==
- Porthtowan was the inspiration for several paintings by G.E. Treweek entitled: A Glimpse of the Sea, Porthtowan; A Sketch of Porthtowan; and Looking up the Valley, Porthtowan.
