= Trevellas =

Coordinates: 50.325°N 5.174°W

Trevellas: Cornish: Trevelles
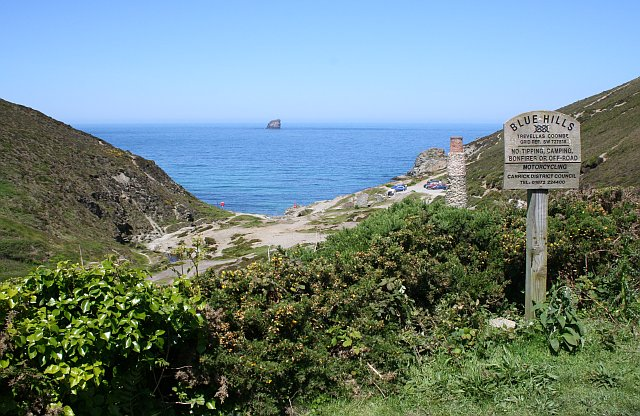
- From Trevellas Coombe to the Sea

- Location within Cornwall
- Civil parish: St Agnes
- Unitary authority: Cornwall
- Shire county: Cornwall
- Ceremonial county: Cornwall
- Region: South West
- Country: England
- Sovereign state: United Kingdom
- Police: Devon and Cornwall
- Fire: Cornwall
- Ambulance: South Western
- UK Parliament: Truro & Falmouth

Trevellas (Cornish: Trevelles) is a village in Cornwall, England, United Kingdom, situated midway between St Agnes and Perranporth.

It was first recorded as a place in Cornwall in 1302 and was the site of the Trevelles family manor. Trevellas valley was a mining site for centuries and known as the "Blue Hills" coloured by bluish slate. During World War II the nearby Perranporth airport was used as a Royal Air Force base. Painter John Opie was born in Trevellas.

== Geography ==
There are many scenic cliff path walks around the area, static caravan sites and walks in Woodland Trust wooded areas. Interesting features along the coast include Trevellas Porth, which is popular with divers and fishermen, but because it is quite rocky it is not recommended for swimming.

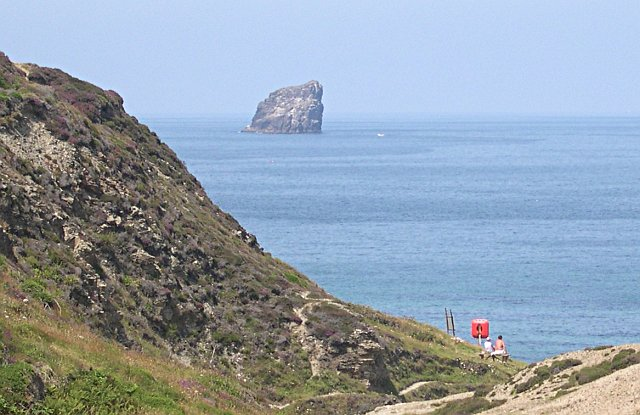
Bawden Rocks from Trevellas Coombe

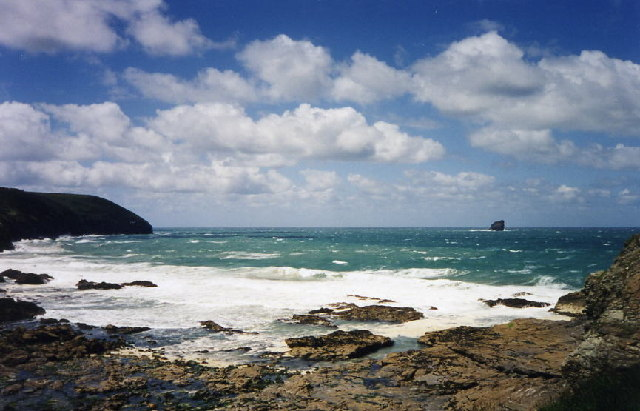
St Agnes, Trevellas Porth

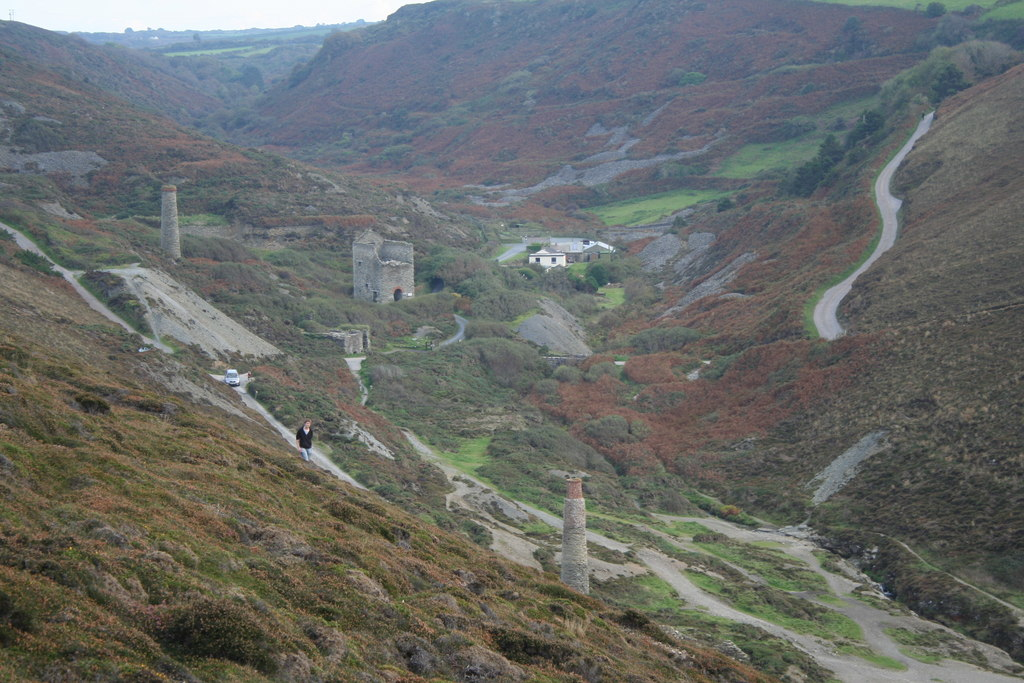
Trevellas Coombe and Blue Hills Tin Mine

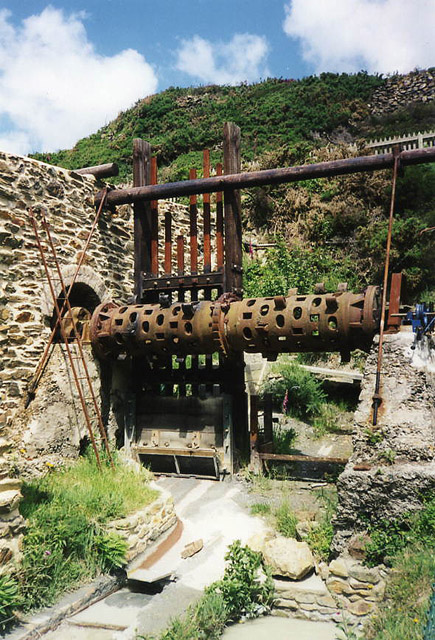
Blue Hills Tin Streams. Water-powered Cornish Stamps used for dressing tin.

The area towards Trevellas Porth is known as "Blue Hills" due to bluish in-ground slate. Trevellas valley has been a site for tin mining for several centuries, and in 1810 the Blue Hills Sett incorporated many of the small mines. Though Blue Hills closed in 1897, tin production has continued in Trevellas to the present and the Blue Hills works can be visited between April and October each year.

== History and antiquities ==
=== Antiquities ===
A Bronze Age barrow site lies at the end of one of the Trevellas Airfield runways. Excavated in 1940 by Charles Kenneth Croft Andrew, the site is believed to be a tumulus or burial site that had a bucket urn and pottery sherds. It was defined as an "intact ritual deposit", probably from about 2000 BC. There are no sign of its former shape.

=== History ===
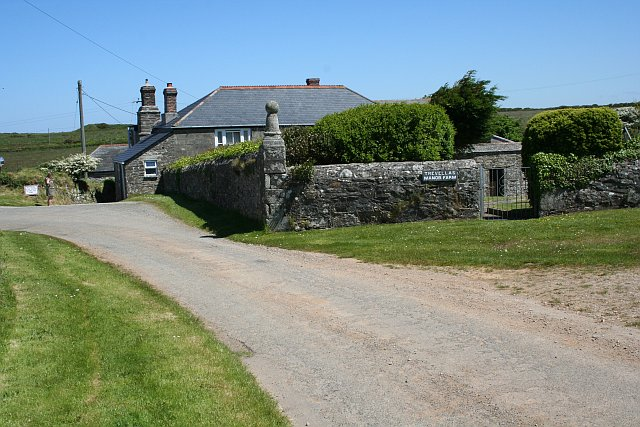
Trevellas Manor Farm

Trevellas is first recorded in 1302, and was for several generations the seat of the Trevelles Family. The Trevellas country house was built during the Middle Ages. Sometime between 1540 and 1901 a new house was erected where the country house once stood.

The estate then passed through the families of Kearne, Croker, St. Aubyn, Donnithorne and finally the Chilcots. In Lysons's Magna Britannia it states the following:

Treuellis or Trevellis, a tenement in the manor of Tywarnhaile, was for several descents the seat of the family of Crocker; it belonged afterwards to Mr. Joseph Donnithorne, and is now the property of Mr. Chilcot. The mansion is occupied as a farm-house.

The estate was broken up in several sales, the final one being in 1948.

The village had a post office and shop until the 1980s when it was closed and is now divided into two dwellings. The shop was owned by Mrs Menadue and was known as Menadue drapers and store. It was famed for its ginger beer.

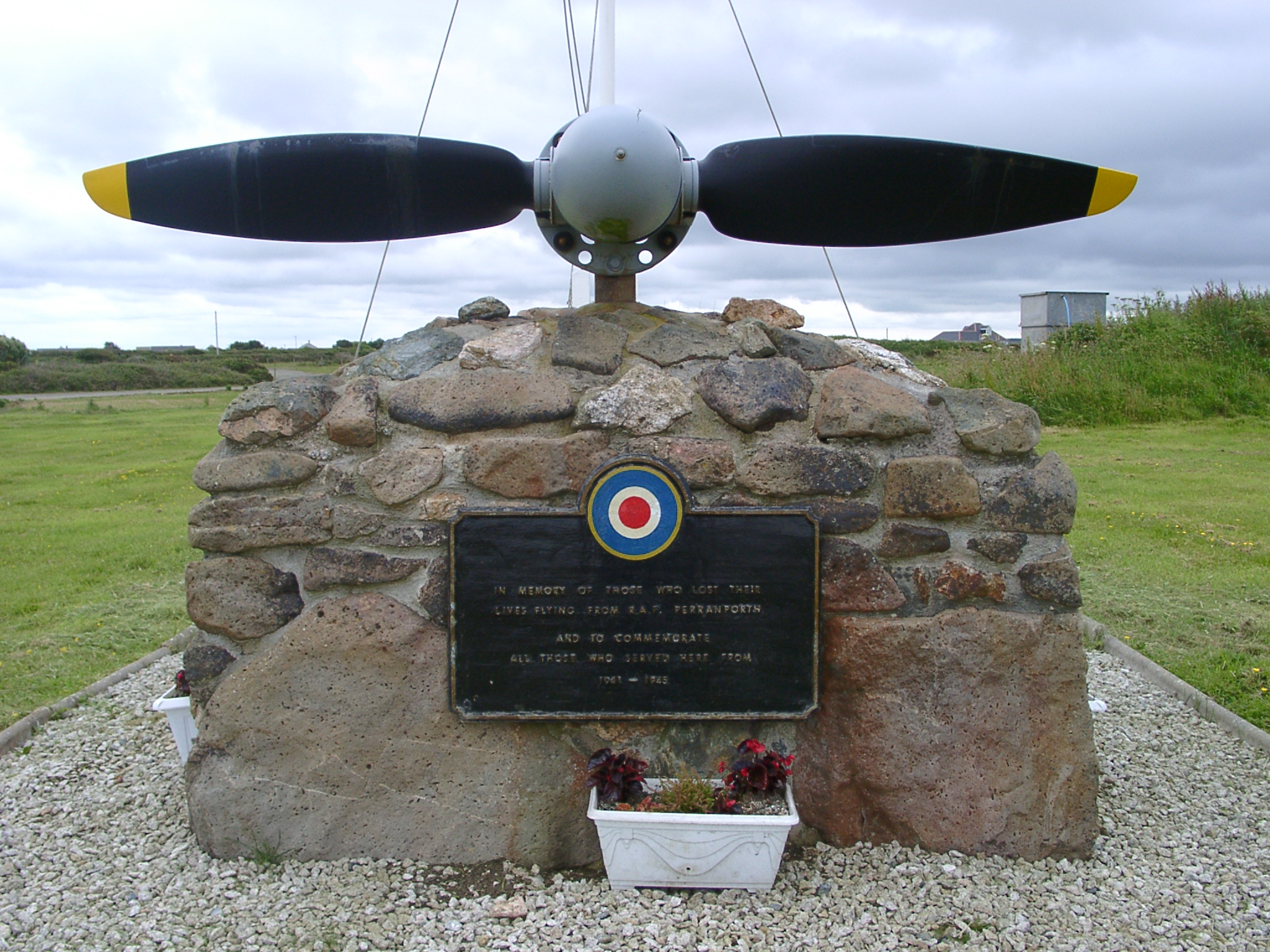
View of World War II war memorial, Perranporth Airfield

== Perranporth Airfield ==
=== World War II ===
In World War II the nearby Perranporth Airfield was used as a base for the Royal Air Force. It became operational on 28 April 1941. At the height of the war over nineteen spitfire squadrons from Australia, France, Canada, Poland, Czechoslovakia and the U.K were based there.

On 13 September 1943 Supermarine Spitfire Vc EE727 FU-? Of 453 Squadron Royal Australian Air Force returning to Perranporth crashed onto the cottage at Trevellas occupied by Mrs Walker, her four-year-old son Barry and one year old son Ronald. Mrs Walker was seriously injured and her son Barry was killed. He is buried in St Agnes cemetery. The pilot 414505 Flight Sgt Mervyn Francis Nolan RAAF was also killed. Below are the two images of the crash site, taken on either the day of the crash or the morning after.

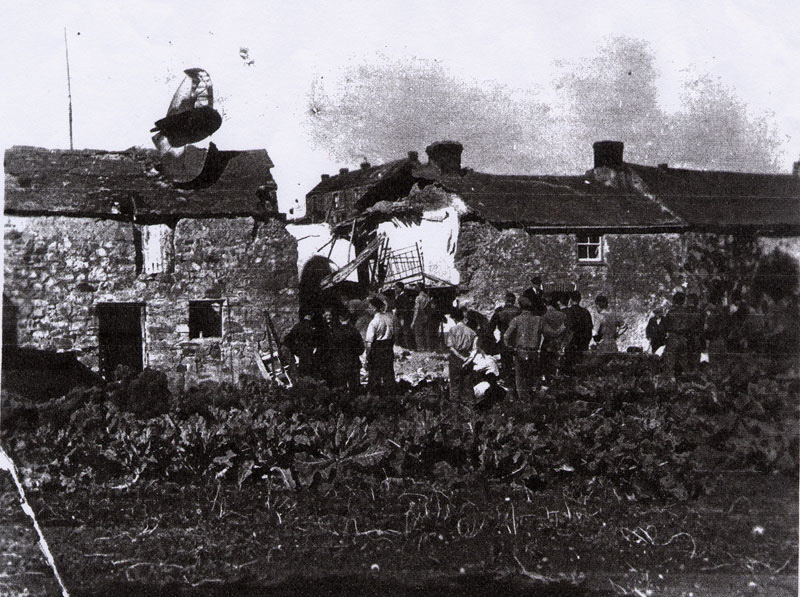
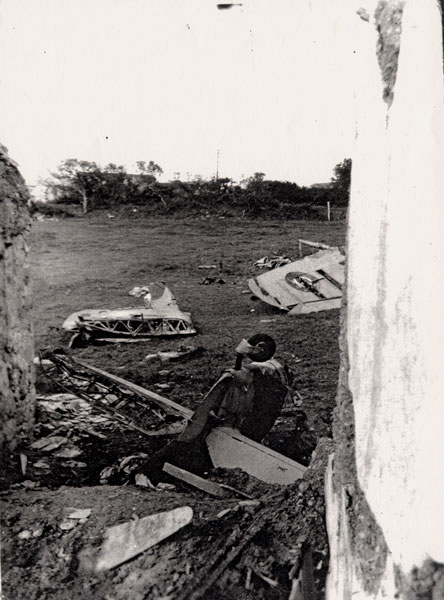

=== Post-war ===
The land was supposed to be handed back to the local residents at the end of the war but fell into disrepair until the purchase as a private airfield.

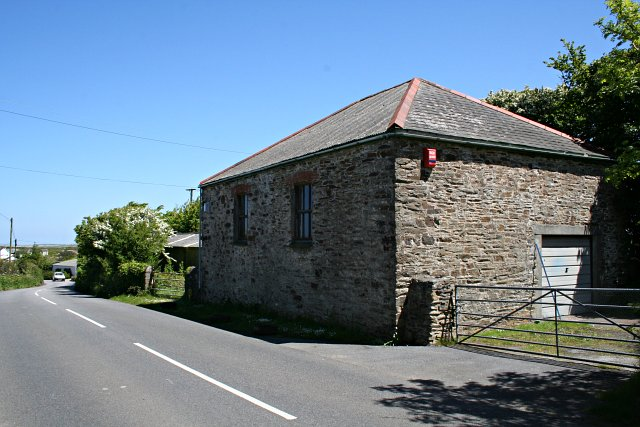
Former Methodist Chapel on Trevellas Downs

== Religion ==
A Catholic chapel was built in 1882 on Trevellas Downs.

== Notable people ==
John Opie, the painter known as The Cornish Wonder, was born here.
