= St Agnes, Cornwall =

Village and civil parish in England

Coordinates: 50.312°N 5.204°W

St Agnes: Cornish: Breanek
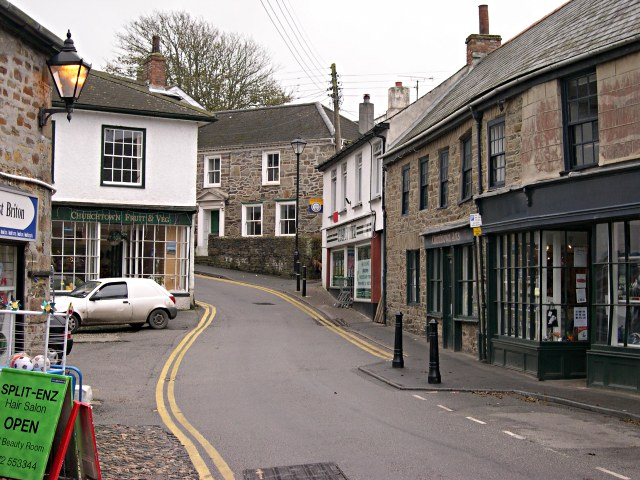
- Churchtown, St Agnes

- Location within Cornwall
- Population: 8,591 (2021 census)
- OS grid reference: SW721507
- Unitary authority: Cornwall
- Shire county: Cornwall
- Ceremonial county: Cornwall
- Region: South West
- Country: England
- Sovereign state: United Kingdom
- Post town: St. Agnes
- Postcode district: TR5
- Dialling code: 01872
- Police: Devon and Cornwall
- Fire: Cornwall
- Ambulance: South Western
- UK Parliament: Truro & Falmouth

St Agnes (Cornish: Breanek) is a civil parish and village on the north coast of Cornwall, England, United Kingdom. The village is about five miles (8.0 km) north of Redruth and ten miles (16 km) southwest of Newquay. At the 2021 census, the parish had a population of 8,591.

The town of St Agnes, a popular coastal tourist spot, lies on a main road between Redruth and Perranporth. It was a prehistoric and modern centre for mining of copper, tin and arsenic until the 1920s. Local industry has also included farming, fishing and quarrying, and more recently tourism.

The St Agnes district has a heritage of industrial archaeology and much of the landscape is of considerable geological interest. There are also stone-age remains in the parish. The manor of Tywarnhaile was one of the 17 Antiqua maneria of the Duchy of Cornwall.

== Geography ==
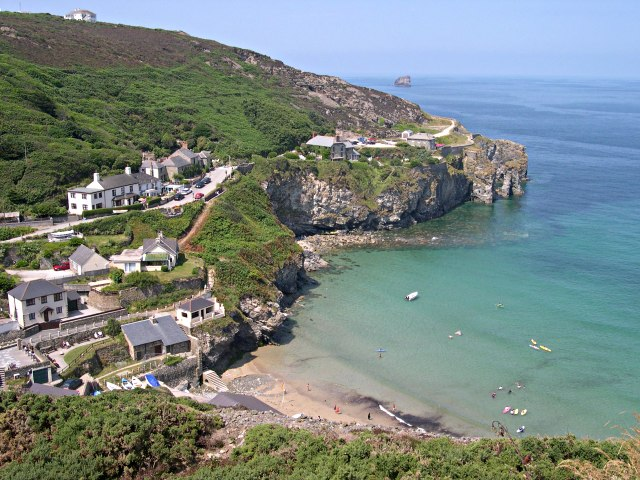
Trevaunance Cove

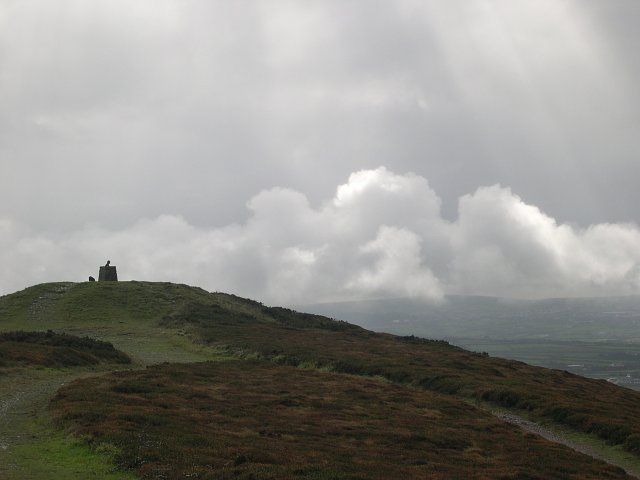
Clearing skies over St Agnes Beacon

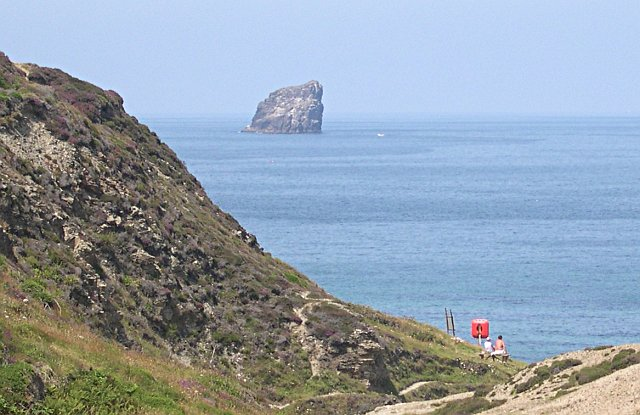
Bawden Rocks from Trevellas Coombe

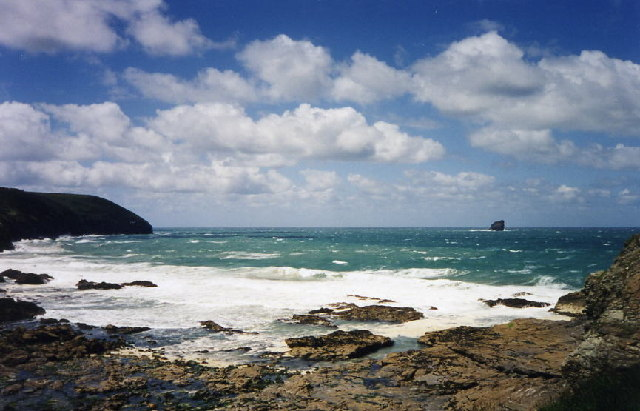
St Agnes, Trevellas Porth

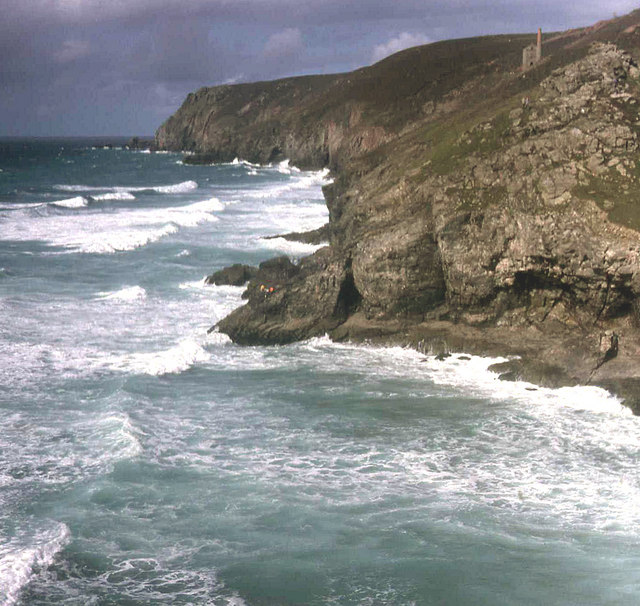
Mouth of Chapel Porth

In addition to St Agnes village, the civil parish includes the hamlets of Blackwater, Mithian, Mount Hawke, and Porthtowan.

St Agnes is on Cornwall's north coast, along the Celtic Sea in the Atlantic Ocean. This stretch has been designated as St Agnes Heritage Coast, a nationally protected area since 1986. The marine site protects 40 species of mammals and amphibians. Interesting features along the coast include Trevaunance Cove, Trevellas Porth, Crams, Chapel Porth, Hanover Cove, and Porthtowan. Some of these have beaches, and there are also two beaches at Perranporth.

The 627-hectare (1,550-acre) Godrevy Head to St Agnes site of special scientific interest, starts at Godrevy Head (with the Godrevy Towans) in the west and continues for 20 kilometres (12 mi) to the north east, through Portreath, Porthtowan and ends just past St Agnes Head, north of the village.

St Agnes Beacon overlooks the Atlantic and is considered "the most prominent feature" of the heritage coastline, with coastal and inland views that may be enjoyed during hillside walks. The National Trust landmark's name comes from the Cornish name Bryanick. "Beacon" is a word of Anglo-Saxon origin referring to the use of a hill summit for a warning signal fire. During the Napoleonic Wars a guard was stationed on the hill to look out for French ships and light a warning fire on seeing any.

St Agnes Beacon and the surrounding cliff tops are one of the last remnants of a huge tract of heathland which once spread across Cornwall. This rare and important habitat is internationally recognised for its wealth of wildlife and from late summer onwards comes alive with colour, forming a brilliant yellow and purple patchwork of gorse and heather.

— National Trust

== Geology ==
To the northwest foot of the St Agnes Beacon is Cameron Quarry and St Agnes Beacon Pits, Sites of Special Scientific Interest noted for their geological interest. Trevaunance Cove is also a Site of Special Scientific Interest and a Geological Conservation Review site of national importance for "... the two principal ore-bearing mineral veins associated with the Hercynian St. Agnes-Cligga granite".

== Toponymy ==
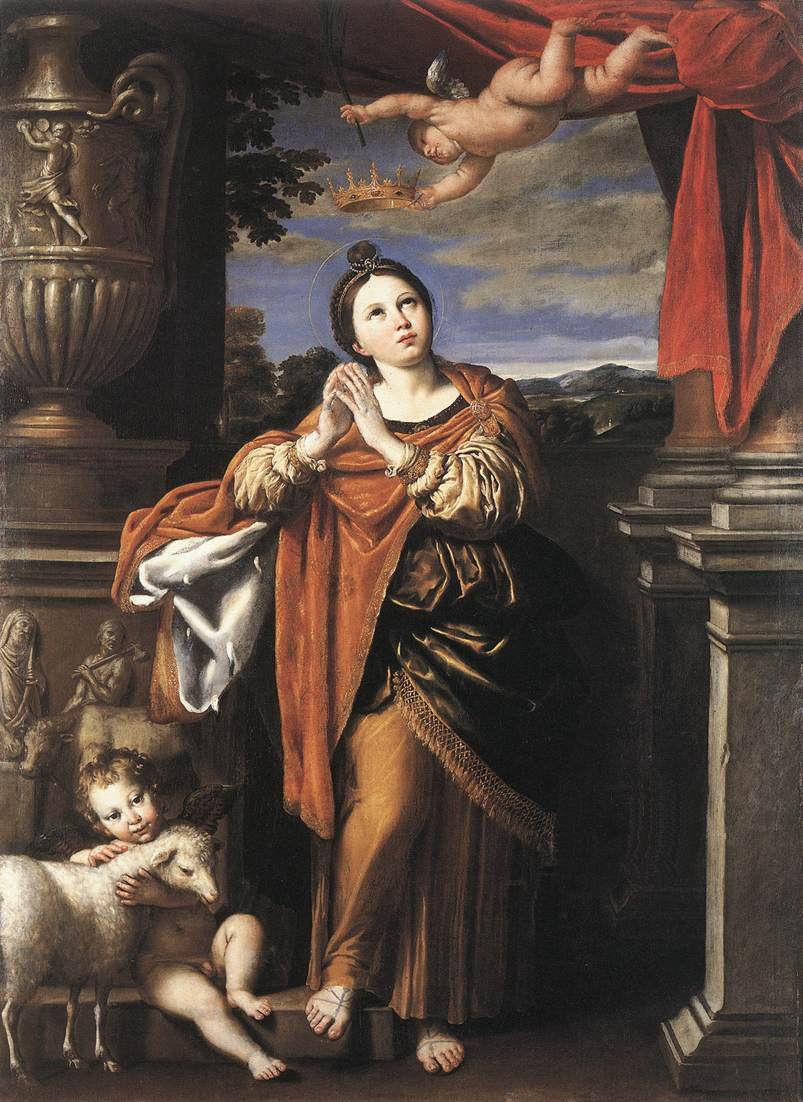
Domenichino, Saint Agnes, c. 1620, Royal Collection, Windsor Castle

The original name of St Agnes was "Bryanick", a Cornish name which may mean pointed hill (i.e. St Agnes Beacon). Craig Weatherhill suggests it was a compound of bre (hill) and Anek (Agnes) and gives the first recorded form as "Breanek" (1420–99).

Neither Bryanick nor St Agnes, though, were established at the time of the Domesday Survey, 1086; the area was included in Perran Sand (Perranzabuloe). The St Agnes Chapel was named after the Roman martyr Agnes of Rome who refused to marry a son of Sempronius, a governor of Rome and member of the Sempronia family. She was killed in 304 AD.

According to Arthur G. Langdon, writing in the 1890s, the inhabitants of St Agnes pronounced its name as if it were "St Anne's" to distinguish it from St Agnes in the Isles of Scilly.

== History and antiquities ==
=== Antiquities ===
There are a number of ancient archaeological sites in the St Agnes parish. The earliest found to date are mesolithic fragments which are dated from 10,000 to 4,000 BC. They were found near New Downs and West Polberro.

During the Bronze Age, barrows were created in many places in the area, (Note: Near Carn Gowla is a Bronze Age (2600 to 700 BC) clearance cairn field, which seems to indicate a particular plan, such as the clearance of a field for agriculture. The Trevellas Barrow site lies at the end of one of the Trevellas Airfield runways. Excavated in 1940 by Charles Kenneth Croft Andrew, the site is believed to be a tumulus or burial site that had a bucket urn and pottery sherds. It was defined as an "intact ritual deposit", probably from about 2000 BC. There are no sign of its former shape. A larger barrow site east of St Agnes village shows evidence of cremation and up to eight barrows. St Agnes Beacon is the site of several barrows or cairns from this age. It was later a beacon point sometime between 1580 and 1732 and a prospect tower between 1767 and 1799. There were other Bronze Age barrows in the area.) which was probably because its rich supply of bronze-making raw materials: copper and tin. During the Iron Age there were more forts and evidence of mining. (Note: On St Agnes Beacon is the site of an Iron Age hillfort and oval enclosure. The enclosure follows the northern edge of the hill for 180 metres (590 ft). Just south of Mount Hawke was an Iron Age round and 60 by 70 metres (200 by 230 ft) enclosure. There may have also been mining or quarry activity on this site during the Middle Ages. Northwest of Wheal Rose was an Iron Age building, a terraced field system, and an excavation pit. On the coast, west of St Agnes Beacon, is a piece of land called Tubby's Head. It was an Iron Age (800 BC to 43 AD) promontory fort or quay about 20 by 2.3 metres (65.6 by 7.5 ft). A causeway entrance exists to the north side of the site.) A noteworthy Iron Age site is the Caer Dane hillfort, 2.2 mi southeast of Perranporth. It had three concentric defensive walls surrounding the inner, topmost ring. St Piran's enclosed round was 660 feet (200 m) wide and may have been a "playing place" (performance area). During the Middle Ages it was converted to a "Plain-an-gwarry (theatre)". It is still used sometimes as a theatre. (Note: Bronze Age and Iron Age material goods that have been excavated include arrowheads, axes, stone tools and vessels, and spindle whorls.)

There are other prehistoric geographic features, but the specific age or time period is unclear. (Note: Caer Kief, for instance, is a prehistoric earthwork or hillfort defined as a "round", which means a small Iron Age settlement, but its dates of construction and habitation are unclear. Located south of Carnkief and west of Wheal Frances, it is a subsquare camp measuring 120 by 125 metres (394 by 410 ft). Located on the crest of a ridge, it is encircled by a stone rampart, bank and ditch; the east-west bank was 380 metres (1,250 ft) long. There is also the prehistoric Four Burrows. South of Mount Hawke was a late prehistoric settlement of unenclosed huts. Nearby, close to the houses at Menagissey, are two late prehistoric or Roman rounds with a circular enclosure. They are "the most westerly of a series of apparently associated earthworks seen by (Charles) Thomas which ran between Menagissey and Coosewartha." Other rounds and field systems are found in the area.) The Bolster Bank, or Bolster & Chapel Bulwark, at Porth, is an univallate earthen boundary about 3.3 kilometres (2.1 mi) long. It was likely used for defensive purposes, protecting the heath and valuable tin resources. Located on the "land side" of St Agnes Beacon, evidence of the bulwark can be seen sporadically from Bolster Farm to Goonvrea Farm, down to Wheal Freedom and then to Chapel Coombes. Although much of the boundary has been levelled, it is presently at its highest by Bolster Farm and Goonvrea where it is about 3.3 metres (11 ft) high. It could have been constructed as early as the Iron Age or some time in the Dark Ages.

Some Iron Age buildings and features were used during the Roman period from 43 to 410 AD. (Note: Northwest of Wheal Rose and west of Skinners Bottom was building, a terraced field system, and an excavation pit. South of Mount Hawke, near the houses at Menagissey, are rounds with a circular enclosure built during the late prehistoric period that continued to be used through this period. Also in the area were other rounds and field systems used in a previous and Roman period. Closer to the coast, just southwest of Towan Cross, was a set of rounds and circular enclosures built during the late prehistoric period that have evidence of use during the Roman occupation. Roman Coins through the 4th century AD were found in the St Agnes Parish area.)

=== Middle Ages ===
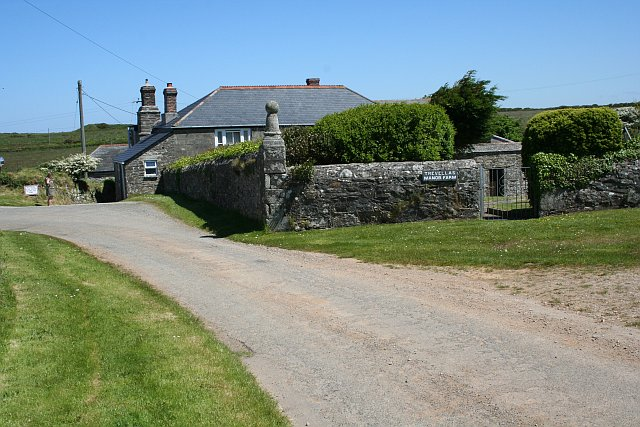
Trevellas Manor Farm

The first chapel or church in St Agnes was believed to have been built as an early Celtic church sometime between 410 and 1066 AD; At that time it also had an enclosure. The Church of St Agnes was built on the same location around 1482. A medieval chapel with an enclosure stood at Chapel Porth, about 570 metres north west of Wheal Freedom. There was a holy well and a post-medieval (1540 to 1901) storehouse or shelter on the site. The chapel was destroyed in 1780, and the holy well remained until 1820. There still remains some ruins of the medieval enclosure and the small building.

During the Middle Ages there was tin working at a St Agnes Head tin works site with an extractive pit for openworks and lode back workings. There are also ancient signs of tin works at Wheal Coates, near the Chapel Porth area cliffs. The site includes an adit, which is a tunnel or access to the mine; dam; dressing floor where the ore was processed for smelting; and an open cut where excavation occurred in a ravine on the surface. There were also prospecting pits to locate ore below the surface and a wheel pit for a water wheel. A bothy provided lodging for the miners. (Note: A medieval rabbit farm was found on St Agnes Head; It was identified by the presence of pillow mounds.)

A manor was built in St Agnes during the Middle Ages. Between 1700 and 1800 a house was built on the site of the previous manor. It is now a convalescent home. A Trevellas country house was built during this period. Sometime between 1540 and 1901 a new house was erected where the country house once stood.

The Charter of Tywarnhayle by King Edgar granted land to Eanwulf in 960 AD.

=== 16th and 17th century ===
A chapel created between 1540 and the 1800s was located just north of Mawla. In its latter years the building was a shed for cows. By 1847 it was in ruins. The St John the Baptist church in Mount Hawke received the font from this church, although its original "Medieval" carvings were lost when the font was resculpted.

It was during this period that the Gill family were first recorded to be living in the area. The Gill family have traced their origins to St Agnes from as early as 1565, where it is believed that they were one of the more influential yeoman families.

The area saw an emergence of a variety of industries, such as public houses. The Miners Arms Public House was constructed in Mithian in the 17th century. It saw additions and renovations in the following two centuries. The building exterior is made of granite, killas rubble, brick and elvan. It is roofed in Delabole slate. Trevaunance Cove had a post medieval lime kiln that operated sometime between 1540 and 1901.

=== 18th and 19th century ===
Medieval mining locations began to take on modern methods of mining in the 19th century, like that at Wheal Coates. Wheal Lushington is thought to have been the biggest tin mining operation in the area. Operational by 1808, smelting was also performed at Wheal Lushington. Modern mining practices were employed at Blue Hills Mine about 1810 and until 1897. There had been prior mining activities in that area before 1780. A number of copper, tin and arsenic mines operated during the 18th, 19th and some into the 20th century.

Allen's Corn Mill operated at Porthtowan between 1752 and 1816.

=== 20th century ===
From 1903 until 1963 a railway station on the Perranporth line operated in St Agnes. After the railway station closed, the dismantled railway was used for the mining industry.

Between 1939 and 1940, Cameron Camp, also known as the 10th Light Anti-Aircraft Practice Camp, Royal Artillery, was built on the site of a Napoleonic Wars target. The camp was named after an area landowner and served as an army camp, slit trench and anti-aircraft battery. After the war the camp was used for housing. It was levelled in 1971. (Note: Cameron Camp was built upon a Napoleonic Wars target, which was built in 1799 and operated through 1815. The target was raised when Cameron Camp was built for World War II.)

== Religion ==
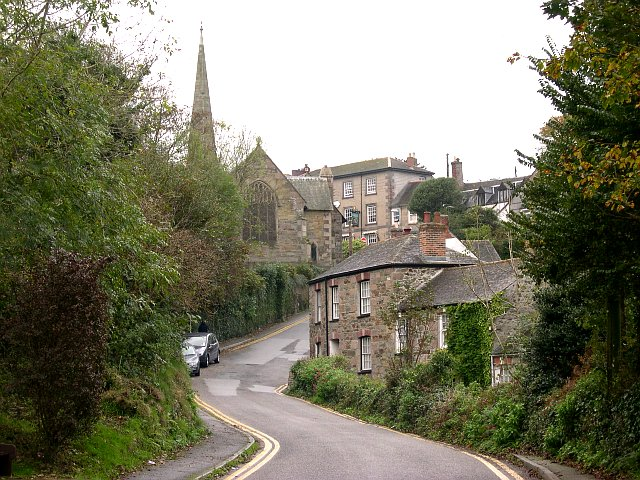
Looking up Town Hill to the church and St Agnes Hotel

There are churches and chapels in the district for three Christian denominations: Anglican, Methodist and Roman Catholic.

=== Anglican ===
==== St Agnes Parish Church ====
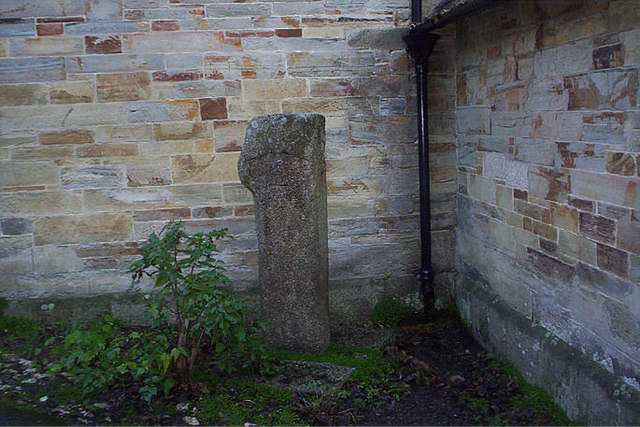
The Cornish cross in the church

The Church of St Agnes is believed to have been built as a chapel of ease about 1482, on the foundation of what is possibly an ancient Celtic church (410 to 1066 AD). The records of the Diocese of Exeter refer to a chapel of St Agnes in the parish of Perranzabuloe in 1374. In medieval and early modern times St Agnes was part of the parish of Perranzabuloe. In 1846 it was made into a parish church and two years later the building itself, exclusive of the spire and tower, was restored by Piers St Aubyn. In 1905 the spire was rebuilt. It is a Grade II listed building.

On the southwest side of the church by the churchyard gate is a granite wayside cross from the Middle Ages. The stone is the remains of a lych stone used for holding coffins. Arthur G. Langdon notes that John Thomas Blight recorded its former use as a lych stone. The head of the stone is incomplete; both part of one side of the head and the uppermost part of the head have been cut off.

==== Mount Hawke Parish Church ====
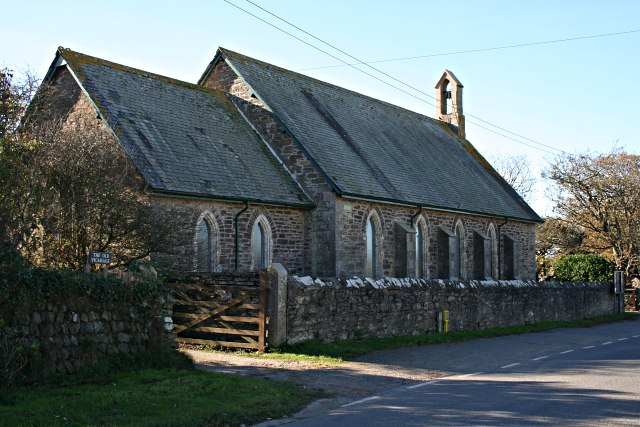
Mount Hawke church

In 1846 the Mount Hawke chapel-of-ease, dedicated to St John the Baptist, was formed from church members who had been meeting in a small building in the village; it became the parish church of the new ecclesiastical parish of Mount Hawke in 1847. The Bishop of Exeter consecrated the stone Perpendicular style building on 5 August 1878.

==== Mithian Parish Church ====
Another Anglican chapel-of-ease was St Peter's Church in Mithian. The Decorated style church was built between Mithian and Blackwater at Chiverton Cross in 1847 and dedicated to St Peter. There had been two or more chapels in Mithian prior to this church. One was at Mawla (subsequently used to shelter cows). The Mithian church closed in 2008.

=== Methodist ===
There are several Methodist churches in St Agnes: the former Wesleyan Methodist church, the former United Methodist chapel and a former Primitive Methodist chapel. Mithian previously had a Wesleyan Methodist chapel. Mawla, Mount Hawke, Skinner's Bottom and Porthtowan all also had Wesleyan chapels. Skinner's Bottom also had a Primitive Methodist chapel. Wheal Rose had a Bible Christian chapel.

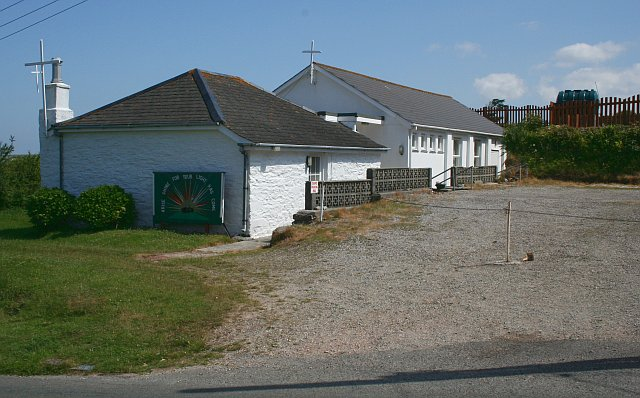
The Chapel on the Hill, Methodist Church, Porthtowan

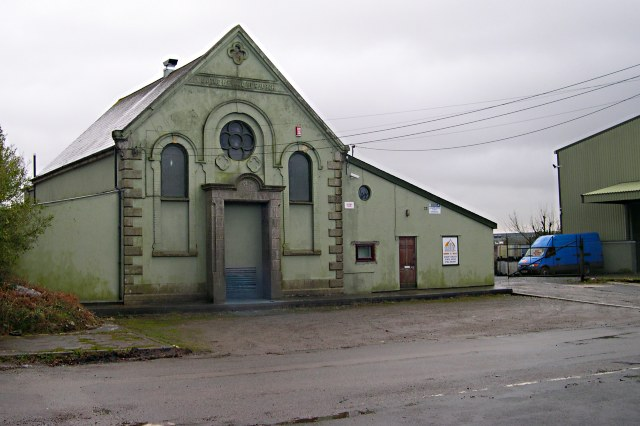
An old Methodist chapel, Wheal Rose

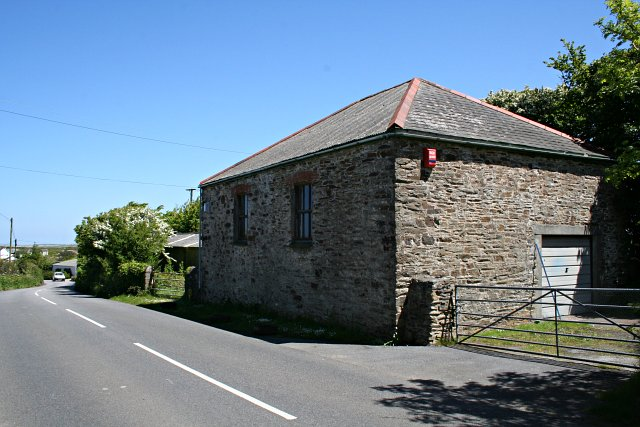
An old Methodist chapel on Trevellas Downs

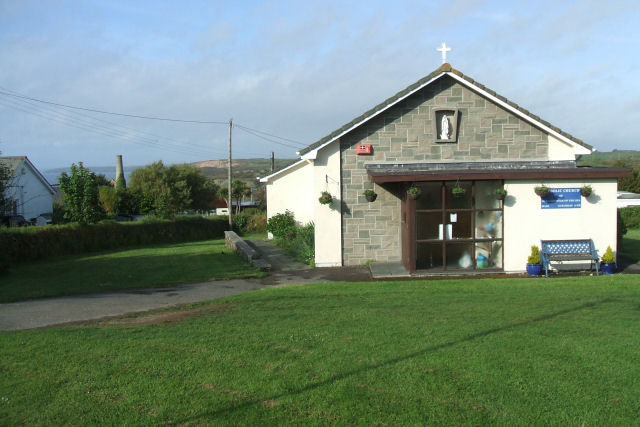
Our Lady, Star of the Sea

=== Roman Catholic ===
A Roman Catholic chapel was built in 1882 on Trevellas Downs. In 1958 the church of Our Lady, Star of the Sea (illustrated above), was built in St Agnes to the designs of Cowell, Drewitt & Wheatly, architects.

== Education ==
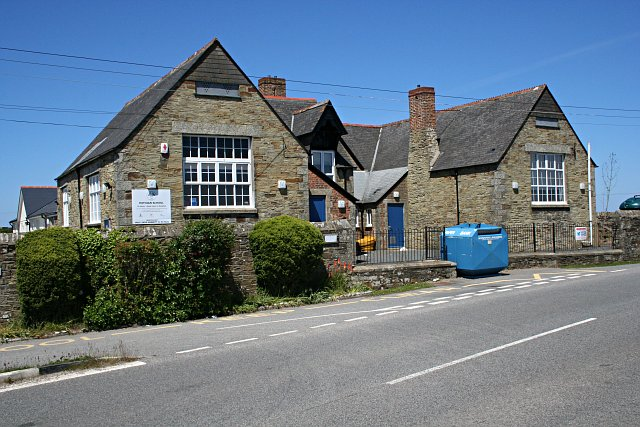
Mithian Primary School

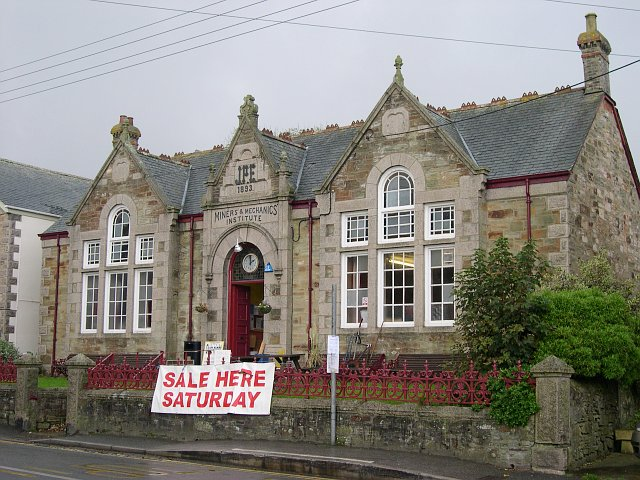
St Agnes Miners and Mechanics Institute

Schools for children ages five to eleven include St Agnes ACE Academy, Mithian Primary School, Blackwater Community Primary School], and Mount Hawke Academy.

Young people from the village and wider parish usually attend secondary and post-16 education at school and colleges in Truro (Richard Lander School, Penair School and Truro and Penwith College), Redruth (Redruth School and Pool Academy) or Camborne (Camborne Science and International Academy and Cornwall College).

Near Blackwater is the Three Bridges Special School for children ages 11 to 19.

John Passmore Edwards in 1893 had built and donated the Miners and Mechanics Institute in the village of St Agnes. Individuals could attend lectures or access the library. This one story building was designed by W. J. Willis and its exterior was made of killas and granite. The gabled roof was covered with Delabole slate. Within the building there were two main rooms and other smaller rooms.

== Culture ==
Outdoor activities include beach side walks, swimming, and surfing. The area has a number of paths for coastal walks or cycling. There are also art shows, craft fayres, tea parties and coffee mornings. Music and dancing can be found in the public houses. Annual events are Carnival week, Lifeboat day, Summer plays by the St Agnes Players, Victorian Fair Day and the Bolster the Giant pageant.

The Blue Hills area hosts the Motor Cycling Club's Lands End Trial for cars and bikes. The first run being held in 1908. There are several sports clubs including rugby union, football, boxing and netball.

The St Agnes Parish Museum provides information about the history of the St Agnes area. Mining and the coastal history figure prominently, including a 700-pound (320 kg) leatherback turtle.

"Crucible of Terror" was filmed around St Agnes in the summer of 1971.

=== Cornish wrestling ===
St Agnes has held Cornish wrestling tournaments, for prizes, for centuries. Venues for tournaments included the Peterville Inn at Peterville.

James Harris, from St Agnes, was a noted wrestler from the 1600s and was commonly called "Skinner". He "beat all and sundry" and was the court wrestler of Charles II. Note that Skinner's Bottom in St Agnes may be named after him.

William Delbridge (1823–1886) was originally from St Agnes and was lightweight champion of Cornwall in 1857. He then emigrated to Australia, where he was a respected stickler (umpire at a Cornish wrestling tournament) at many tournaments.

== Economy ==
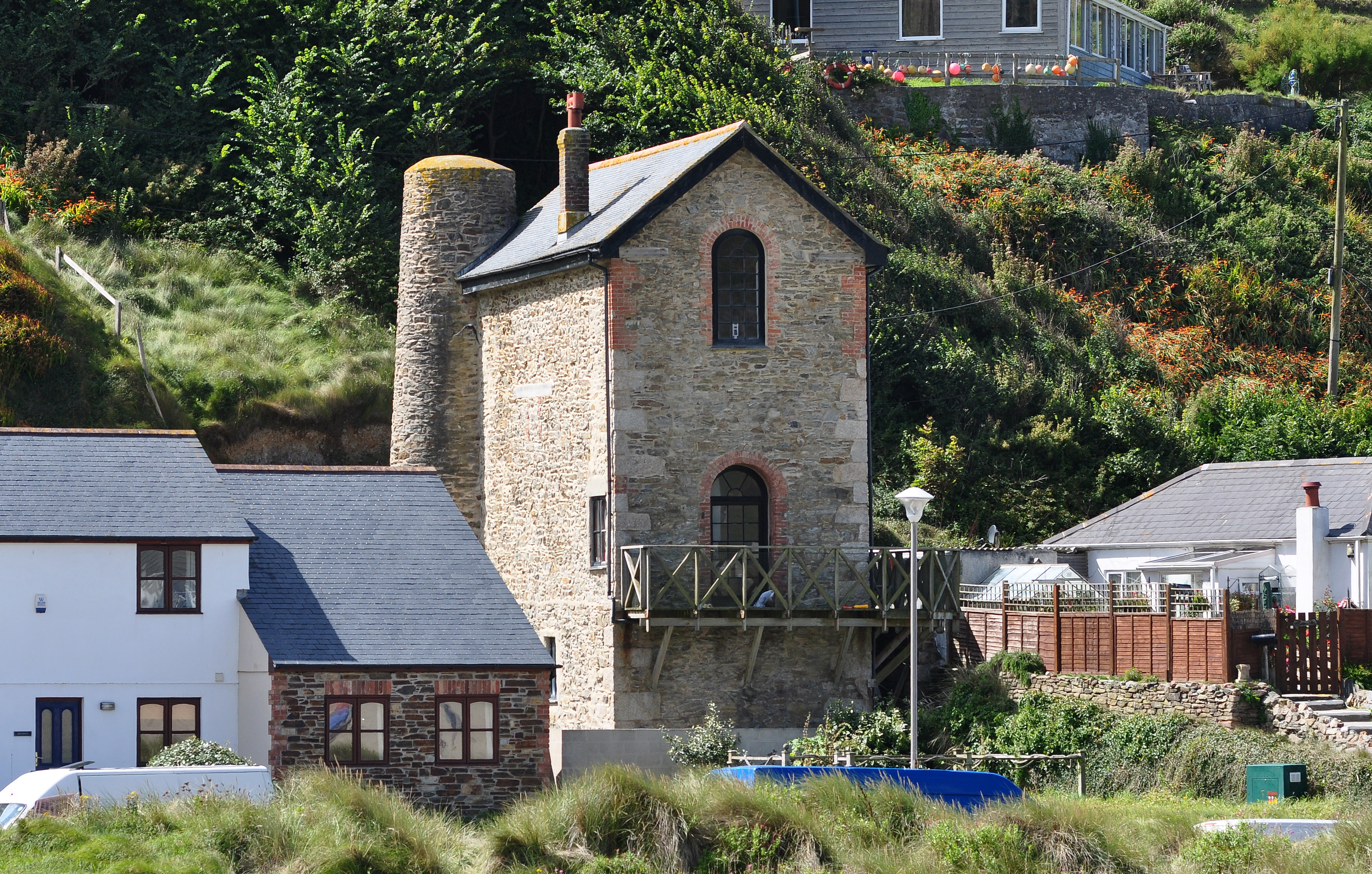
The former Wheal Lushington engine house in Porthtowan, Cornwall has been converted into a cafe.

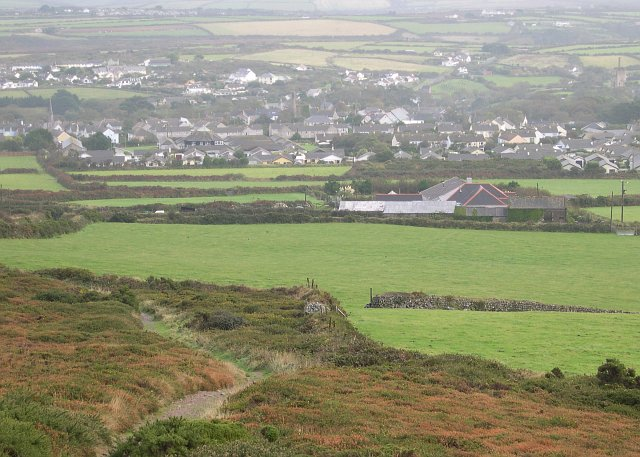
St Agnes and surrounding farm land from St Agnes Beacon

Historically, St Agnes and the surrounding area relied on fishing, farming and mining for copper and tin. There were also iron foundries and an iron works, stamps and crazing mills, a smelter, blowing houses and clay extraction.

By the 1930s mining and related industries had nearly ceased and by the 1950s the area had very little industrial commerce. Instead, the area became a bedroom community for workers in the surrounding towns and cities like Newquay and Truro, a desired retirement community and a favoured holiday spot. The mining history is part of the draw for tourists, like the Blue Hills Tin Streams where tourists can see tin work demonstrations.

St Agnes village is relatively self-sufficient with local shops and business enterprises that support the village itself and the surrounding farming country.

=== Agriculture ===
Prior to the mid-19th century, the moors and waste land would not support a great agricultural industry. Although after the land was agriculturly improved, there was an increase in the number of farms. In 1878 after the enclosure of heath, cultivation had almost reached the summit of St Agnes Beacon. By the late 19th century it was the "largest single trade in the locality and parish". Maltings, a related industry operated in Peterville in the 19th century.

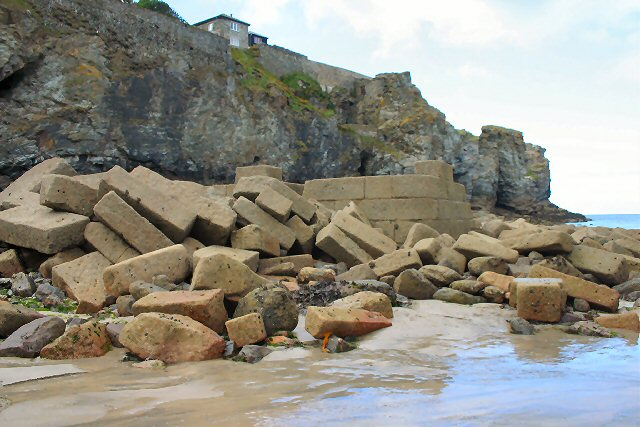
Remains of former harbour at Trevaunance Cove

=== Harbour ===
Since the 17th century there have been many attempts to create a harbour for St Agnes. Between 1632 and 1709 the Tonkins, lords of the manor of Trevaunance, expended the family legacy as they tried to build a harbour. Three attempts were made, the last of which was assisted by Henry Winstanley, but that harbour was washed away in 1705. The harbour built in 1710 by an unrelated party was levelled in 1730 by the crashing Atlantic Ocean waves. A new harbour constructed in 1798 supported a fishing industry and allowed for the export of copper ore and the import of coal from South Wales for the smelters at the mines. St Agnes remained a busy port until the collapse of the harbour wall in a storm in 1915/16. There are only remains of the old harbour in existence.

In 1802, a pilchard fishing industry was established from the harbour, reaching its peak in 1829 and 1830 before declining.

=== Mining ===
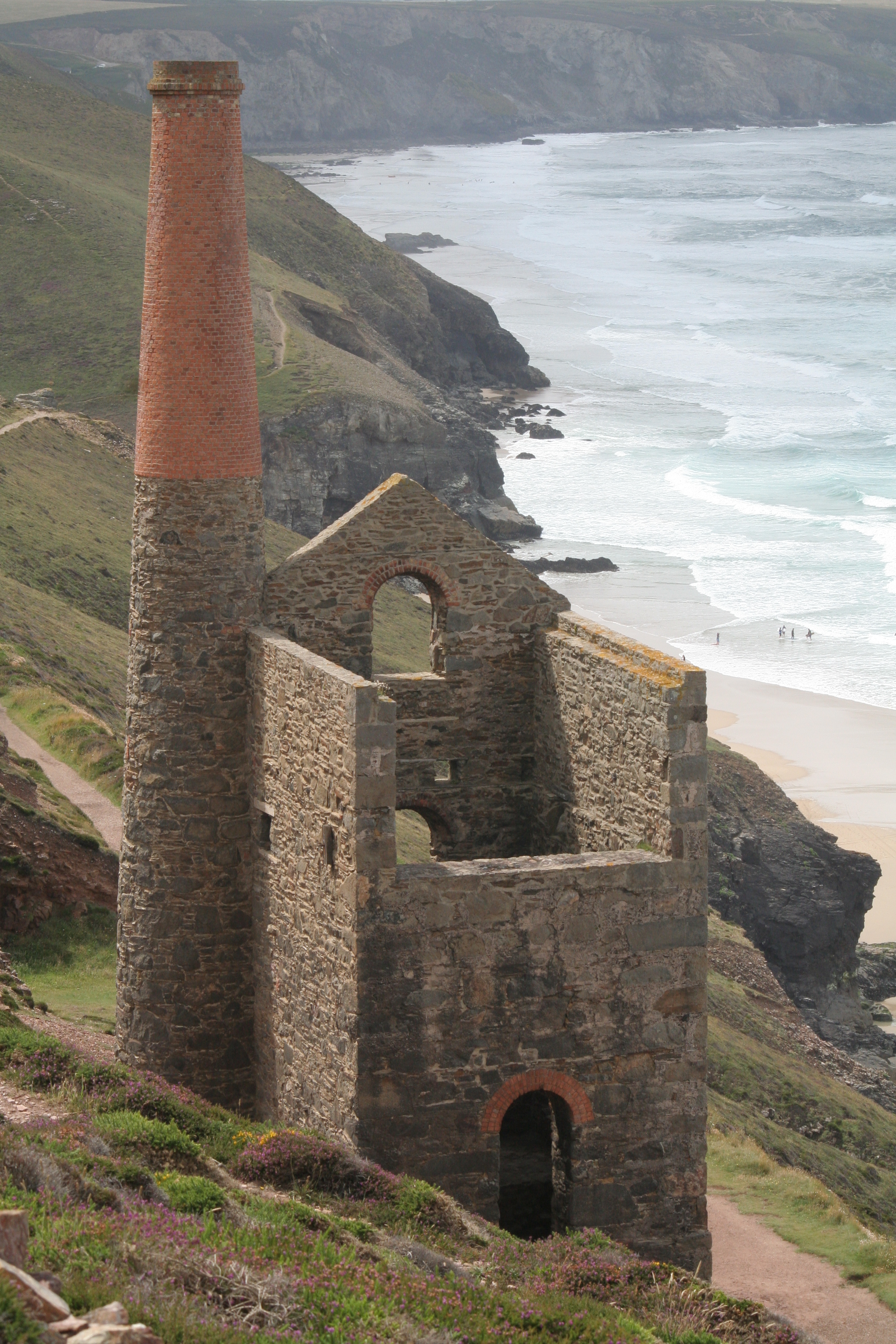
Towanroath engine house, Wheal Coates

Cornwall, along with its neighbouring county of Devon, was an important source of tin for Europe and the Mediterranean throughout ancient times, but began dominating the market during late Roman times in the 3rd century AD with the exhaustion of many Spanish tin mines. Cornwall maintained its importance as a source of tin throughout medieval times and into the modern period.

At their height about 100 mines employed 1000 miners. Mining came to an end in the 1920s and many of these mines are still on view for tourists. United Hills mine produced 86,500 tons of copper ore, 1826–1906; and Wheal Towan 54,610 tons, 1800–31. Lesser quantities of black tin were produced from these mines: West Wheal Kitty 10,070 tons (1881–1915); Wheal Kitty 9,510 tons (1853–1918); Polberro 4,300 tons (1837–95); Penhalls 3,610 tons (1834–96); and Blue Hills 2,120 tons (1858–97). Much of the Cornwall and West Devon Mining Landscape, a World Heritage Site, is in the parish. Tin production is still worked at the Blue Hills Tin Streams

Wheal Coates was the site of medieval mining between 1066 and 1540, and it was a modern mining producer from 1802 and into the 20th century. The visible remains of Wheal Coates are the engine houses built in the 1870s to crush ore, run a Calciner, or pump water. The sites, owned by the National Trust, include the Whim Engine House, Towanroath Pumping Engine House and the Calciner. Before that the Jericho valley, where Blue Hills Tin Streams operated, had supported mining operations for centuries. At Chapel Coombe a set of old Cornish stamps has been re-erected by the Trevithick Society. Stippy Stappy is a row of 18th century cottages on a very steep incline.

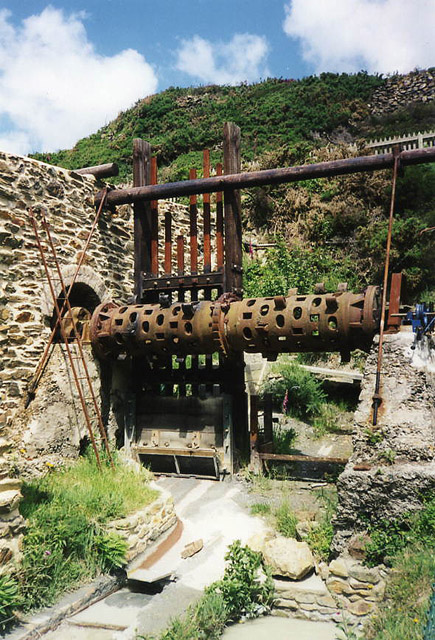
St Agnes: Blue Hills Tin Streams. Water-powered Cornish Stamps used for dressing tin.

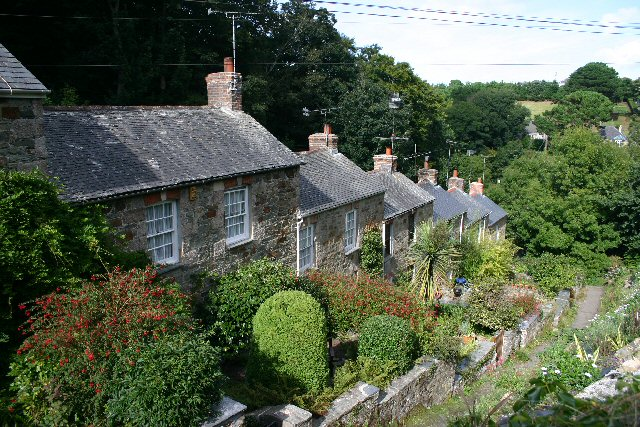
Stippy Stappy miners' cottages

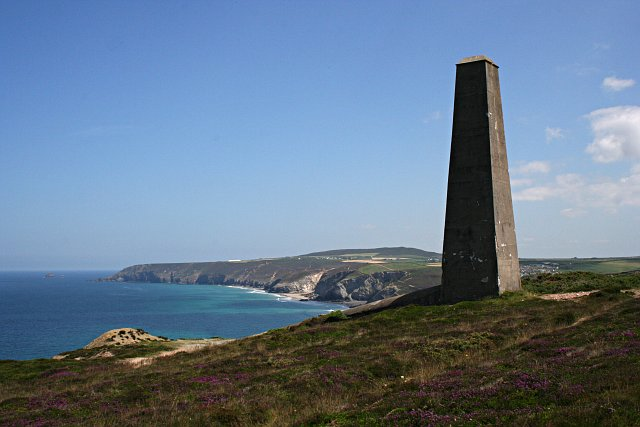
Clifftop Tower. In the distance are St Agnes Head and Beacon.

=== Tourism ===
St Agnes is a popular tourist destination. The coastal area is maintained by the National Trust and is designated part of the Cornwall National Landscape area of outstanding natural beauty (AONB). Beaches in the St Agnes Parish include Trevaunance Cove, near the village of St Agnes. It is a small sandy beach with lifeguards and adequate parking. Porthtowan village also has a sandy beach. Trevellas Porth is popular with divers and fishermen, but because it is quite rocky it is not recommended for swimming. Chapel Porth is another area beach.

== Demographics ==
At the 2021 census, St Agnes parish had a population of 8,591 in 3,729 households.

Census population of St Agnes parish
Census	Population	Female	Male	Households	Source
2001	7,257	3,793	3,464	3,327	
2011	7,565	4,010	3,555	3,404	
2021	8,591	4,478	4,113	3,729	

In 2010, the population was 1,440 in St Agnes Central and 2,480 in St Agnes Fringe, Mithian and Trevellas for a total of 3,920 people. In Blackwater and Mount Hawke there were 2,130 people and in Porthtowan and Wheal Rose there were an additional 1,580 people. The total of the numbers from these neighbourhoods was 7,630.

St Agnes working aged (16–64) summary
Description	St Agnes Central	St Agnes Fringe, Mithian and Trevellas	Blackwater and Mount Hawke	Porthtowan and Wheal Rose	Total	Percentage of Total Working Aged
Working aged	852	1,506	1,232	1,028	4,618	
Not claiming benefits	762	1,351	1,102	883	4,098	89%
Out of work benefits	70	120	110	120	420	9%
Other benefits, includes carers, disabled, bereaved and unknown	20	35	20	25	100	2%

The following is an aggregate statistic of the community network area that St Agnes shares with Perranporth for managing local governmental activities with Cornwall Council:

St Agnes and Perranporth Community Network Area Population 2010
Community Network Area	Age 0–15	Working age	Age 65+	All Ages
St Agnes and Perranporth	2,700	10,600	4,100	17,400

This represents a 6% growth since 2001. With a total network area of 12,453 hectares, the population density is 1.40 acres/person.

== Government and politics ==
At the lower level of local government, St Agnes has a parish council which elects 18 members from the wards of Blackwater, Mithian, Mount Hawke, St Agnes, and Porthtowan.

At the upper level of local government, St Agnes is governed by the Cornwall Council unitary authority. For elections to the council, most of the parish is in St Agnes electoral division; Blackwater is in Perranporth electoral division. Cornwall Council group the words into the St. Agnes and Perranporth Community Network.

Historically, St Agnes was in Pydar hundred and rural deanery. It was in Truro Rural District from 1894 until 1974. It was then in Carrick District until Cornwall became a unitary district in 2009.

For civil registration purposes, since 1 July 1837 St Agnes has been in the Truro registration district.

== Transport ==
There is bus service within Cornwall by a number of operators. The major operator is Go Cornwall Bus. Service runs through the village of St Agnes and other towns.

The nearest railway stations are Redruth and Truro.

== Notable people ==
- Thomas Tonkin (1678–1742), Cornish landowner and historian.
- John Opie (1761–1807), notable painter, born at Trevellas.
- John Passmore Edwards (1823–1911), journalist, newspaper owner and philanthropist
- George Smiley (aged about 60) fictional intelligence officer
- Louise Cooper (1952–2009), writer, lived locally

== See also ==
- Mimetite

== External links and references ==
- World Heritage Listing for St. Agnes
- Cornwall Record Office Online Catalogue for St Agnes
