= Bolster Day =

Annual festival held at Chapel Porth, Cornwall, UK

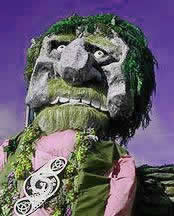
Image of the giant puppet of Bolster from the Bolster Day celebrations

Bolster day is an annual festival held at Chapel Porth cove near St Agnes, Cornwall, UK. The festival is held on the Sunday before the early Spring Bank Holiday in May every year and reenacts the events of the Cornish legend of Bolster the giant and Saint Agnes with use of giant puppets and local performers. During the day there are also Cornish dance displays and other entertainments. It is held on the last Sunday before the May Day bank holiday.

== The legend of Bolster ==
Bolster was a legendary giant who was said to live near the cliffs at St Agnes. He was also rumoured to eat children, sheep, cattle and people at random.

A Knight, Sir Constantine, and other local dignitaries challenge Bolster to a fight to the death. Legend says that the fights took place at Chapel Porth and that the giant overcame all who challenged him. The legend continues to say that he fell in love with a beautiful young girl called Agnes who steals his heart. Young Agnes was the one to finally vanquish the giant. She asks him to fill a nearby hole in the clifftops with his blood to prove his love for her, knowing that there is a crack in the hole which runs out to the sea. Bolster cuts himself to fill the hole and dies due to blood loss. The events of Bolster day recreate this story in more detail.
