= Perranporth Airfield =

Airport in Perranporth, England

Perranporth Airfield (Cornwall)
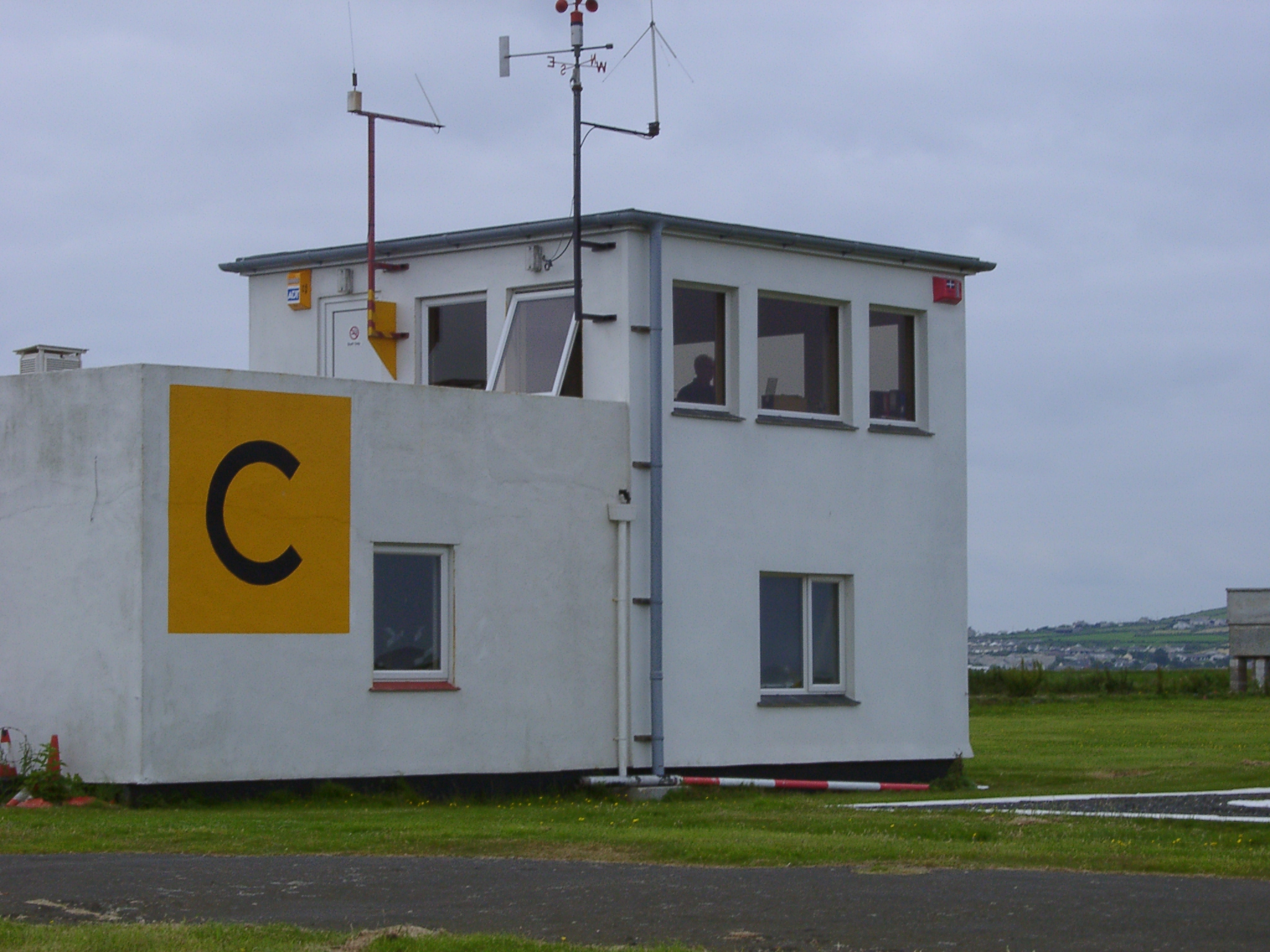
- View of World War II control tower
- IATA: none; ICAO: EGTP

Summary
- Airport type: Public
- Operator: Perranporth Airfield Ltd
- Location: Perranporth
- Elevation AMSL: 330 ft / 101 m
- Coordinates: 50°19′50″N 05°10′46″W
- Website: www.perranporthflyingclub.co.uk

Map
- Location in Cornwall

Runways
| Direction | Length | | Surface |
| Direction | m | ft | Surface |
|---|---|---|---|
| 05/23 | 923 | 3,028 | Asphalt |
| 09/27 | 741 | 2,431 | Asphalt |
| 01/19; Unlicensed | 650 | 2,133 | Asphalt |
- Sources: UK AIP at NATS

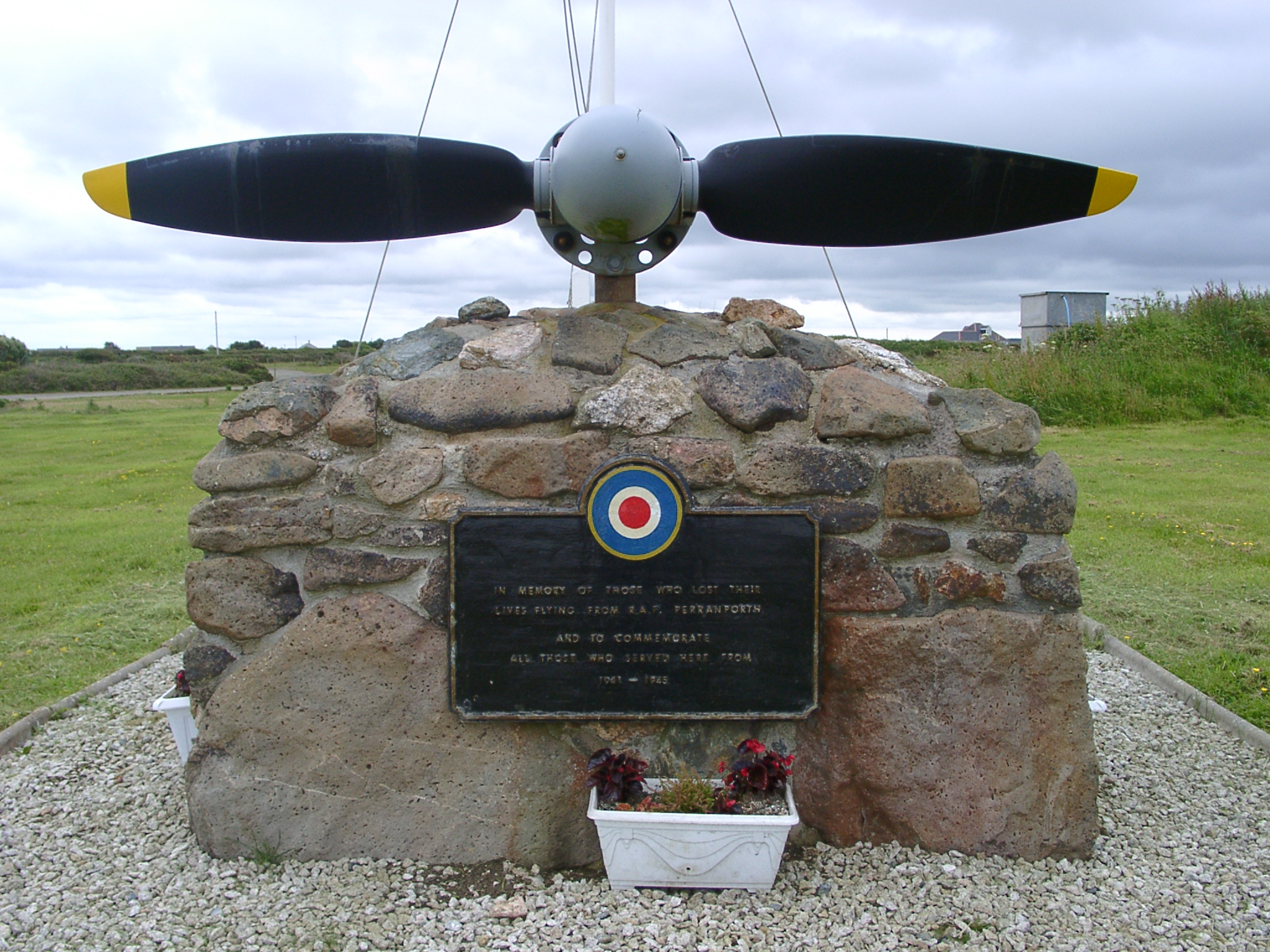
View of World War II war memorial

Perranporth Airfield (ICAO: EGTP) airfield is located 1.5 NM (2.8 km; 1.7 mi) southwest of Perranporth and 6 NM (11 km; 6.9 mi) southwest of Newquay, in the village of Trevellas, Cornwall, England, United Kingdom. It is a former Second World War Royal Air Force fighter station.

Perranporth Aerodrome has a CAA Ordinary Licence (Number P787) that allows flights for the public transport of passengers or for flying instruction as authorised by the licensee (Perranporth Flying Club Limited). The aerodrome is not licensed for night use.

== Royal Air Force use ==
RAF Perranporth became operational on 28 April 1941. The airfield was used by 21 different squadrons flying Spitfires. The airfield was decommissioned in April 1946.

== Postwar use ==
Perranporth Airfield is run by Perranporth Flying Club Ltd. They offer air experience flights, trial lessons and PPL courses.

The airfield has examples of Second World War bunkers, air-raid shelters and revetments. Most are in very good condition, and Spitfire revetments can still be used to tie aircraft down.

Other activities taking place at Perranporth include parachuting, land yachting, motorsport, and cycling events. Clubs for radio controlled cars and aircraft also operate there from time to time.

== See also ==
- Military history of the United Kingdom during World War II
- List of former Royal Air Force stations
