= Tilbury (disambiguation) =

Tilbury is a town in Thurrock, Essex, England

Tilbury may also refer to:

== Places ==
- Tilbury, town in Thurrock, Essex, England
  - Port of Tilbury, port at Tilbury
  - East Tilbury, a village parish in Thurrock, Essex, England
  - West Tilbury, a village in Thurrock, Essex, England
- Tilbury Fort, a fort on the north bank of the River Thames to defend London
- Tilbury, Ontario, Canada, a town
- Tilbury Industrial Park, a business area in the city of Delta, British Columbia, Canada

== People ==
- Dawn Tilbury, American control theorist
- Gervase of Tilbury, (fl.late 12th century), English lawyer and writer
- John Tilbury, (born 1936), British pianist
- Peter Tilbury, (born 1945), British actor and writer
- Zeffie Tilbury, (1863-1950), English actress
- Tilbury Jack, a nickname of John Arundell (admiral) (1495–1561), British Royal Navy admiral

== Music ==
- Tilbury (band), Icelandic indie pop folk band
- The Tilbury Band, English brass band

== Sports ==
- Tilbury F.C., an Association Football club based in Essex

== Others ==
- HMS Tilbury, various Royal Navy ships
- Tilbury (carriage), a horse-drawn carriage
- George Alexander Pyke, Lord Tilbury, a recurring fictional character in the stories of British writer P. G. Wodehouse
- Tilbury Town (disambiguation)

== See also ==
- Tilbury Juxta Clare, a parish in north Essex, England
