= Passmore Edwards Public Library, Shepherd's Bush =

Coordinates: 51.5053°N 0.2259°W

Passmore Edwards Public Library
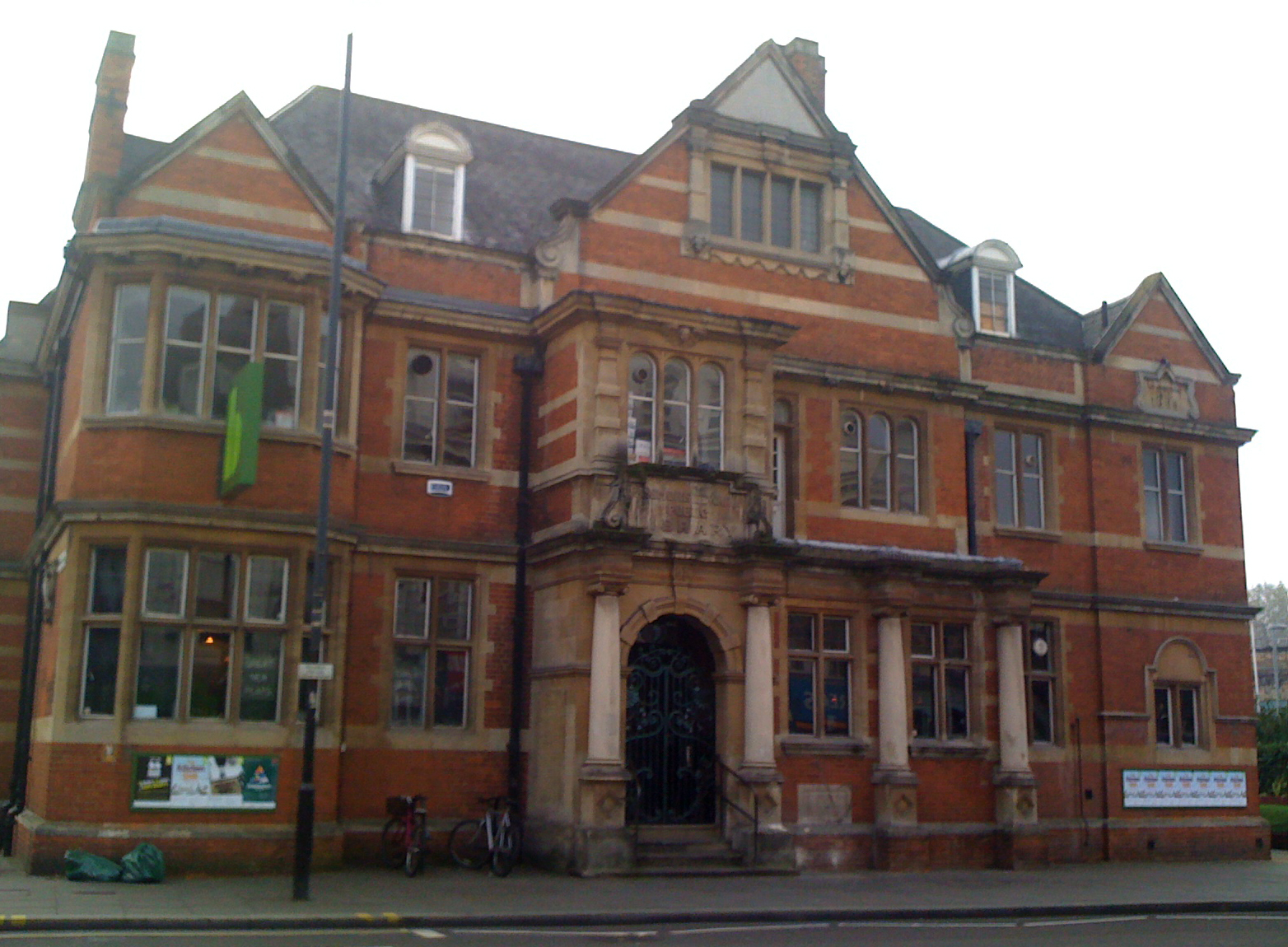
- Passmore Edwards Library, Shepherds Bush
- Interactive map of the Passmore Edwards Public Library area

General information
- Type: Former Library, now a theatre
- Architectural style: Victorian.
- Location: Shepherd's Bush, Uxbridge Road, London W12, London, England
- Current tenants: The Bush Theatre Co
- Construction started: 1895
- Completed: 25 June 1896
- Client: Hammersmith Library Commissioners

Technical details
- Structural system: Timber frame, brick.

Design and construction
- Architect: Maurice Bingham Adams

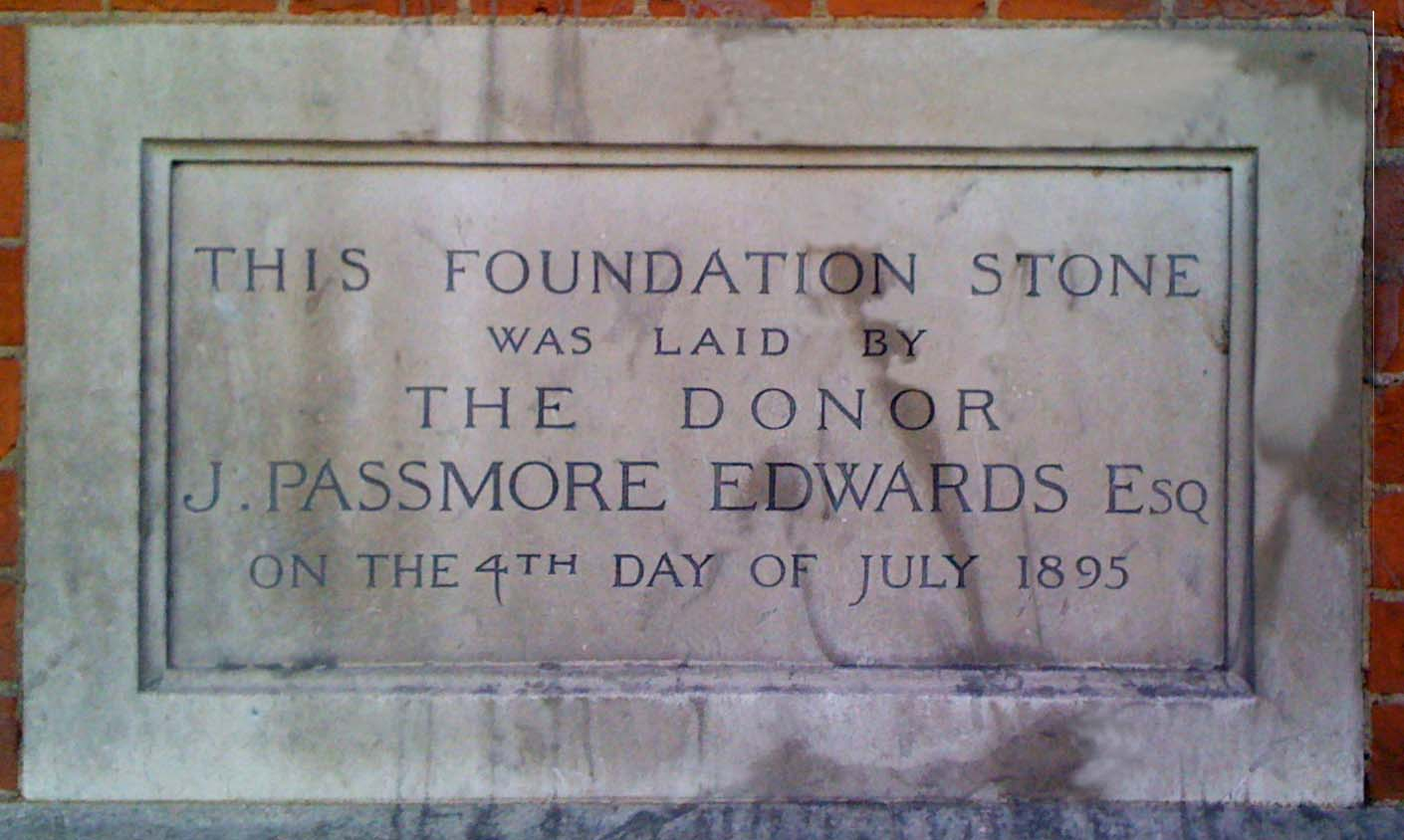
Passmore Edwards Library Shepherd's Bush Foundation Stone

The Passmore Edwards Public Library on the Uxbridge Road, Shepherd's Bush, London, was built in 1895 and funded by the journalist and philanthropist Passmore Edwards. It is one of a number of public libraries that still bear his name today. In 2008 a new library was built in Shepherd's Bush, part of the substantial Westfield London development, and the Passmore Edwards library fell into disuse. In October 2011 it re-opened as the new home of the Bush Theatre.

== History ==
Designed by Maurice Bingham Adams, and originally known as the Passmore Edwards Free Library Hammersmith, the project was one of many public libraries built around the end of the nineteenth century by John Passmore Edwards (1823 – 1911). Edwards was a British journalist, newspaper owner and philanthropist. The son of a carpenter, he was born in Blackwater, a small village between Redruth and Truro in Cornwall, United Kingdom.

Maurice Bingham Adams designed five of the Libraries funded by Passmore Edwards. He and Edwards shared a belief in self-help and the importance of good architecture, which would provide the educational institutions required to educate the British working man and help give Britain a competitive edge.

The library was built in 1895, when Shepherd's Bush was still largely open land, but in the process of being developed to house London's expanding suburbs. A foundation stone, laid by Passmore Edwards, bears the date 4 July 1895. The library was opened by Archibald Primrose, 5th Earl of Rosebery on 25 June 1896.

Many of Shepherd's Bush's new inhabitants were poor and badly educated. In the early 20th century Irish labourers sought work and opportunities in London; their arrival in the capital created fears of urban slums and the spread of disease. At the turn of the century Hammersmith MP Sir William Bull was appalled to see Shepherd's Bush Green become home to destitute unemployed sleeping rough, gambling, and playing pitch and toss.

== Today ==
In October 2011 the library re-opened as the new home of the Bush Theatre. The building is currently included on the London Borough of Hammersmith and Fulham's list of Buildings of Merit, deserving of protection.

== See also ==
- History of Shepherd's Bush
