= Tilbury Town =

Tilbury Town may refer to:

- Tilbury, a town in Thurrock, Essex, England
  - Tilbury Town railway station
- Tilbury Town, a fictional American town in several works by Edwin Arlington Robinson

== See also ==
- Tilbury (disambiguation)
