= HMS Tilbury =

HMS Tilbury is the name of several ships of the Royal Navy.

- HMS Tilbury (1699) was a 50-gun fourth-rate ship of the line which was broken up in 1726.
- HMS Tilbury (1733) was a 60-gun fourth-rate ship of the line. She accidentally caught fire and sank off Hispaniola in 1742.
- HMS Tilbury (1745) was a 58-gun fourth-rate ship of the line. She was driven onto the rocks by a storm in 1757.
- HMS Tilbury (1856) was an Albacore-class gunboat launched in 1856 and broken up in 1865.
- HMS Tilbury (1918) was an S-class destroyer launched in 1918 and sold for breaking up in 1931.
- HMS Tilbury (J228) was a Bangor-class minesweeper transferred to the Royal Indian Navy before she was launched in 1942 and renamed HMIS Konkan (J228).

== See also ==
- PS Tilbury, launched in 1883
- Tilbury (disambiguation)
