= John Passmore Edwards =

British journalist, newspaper owner, MP and philanthropist (1823–1911)

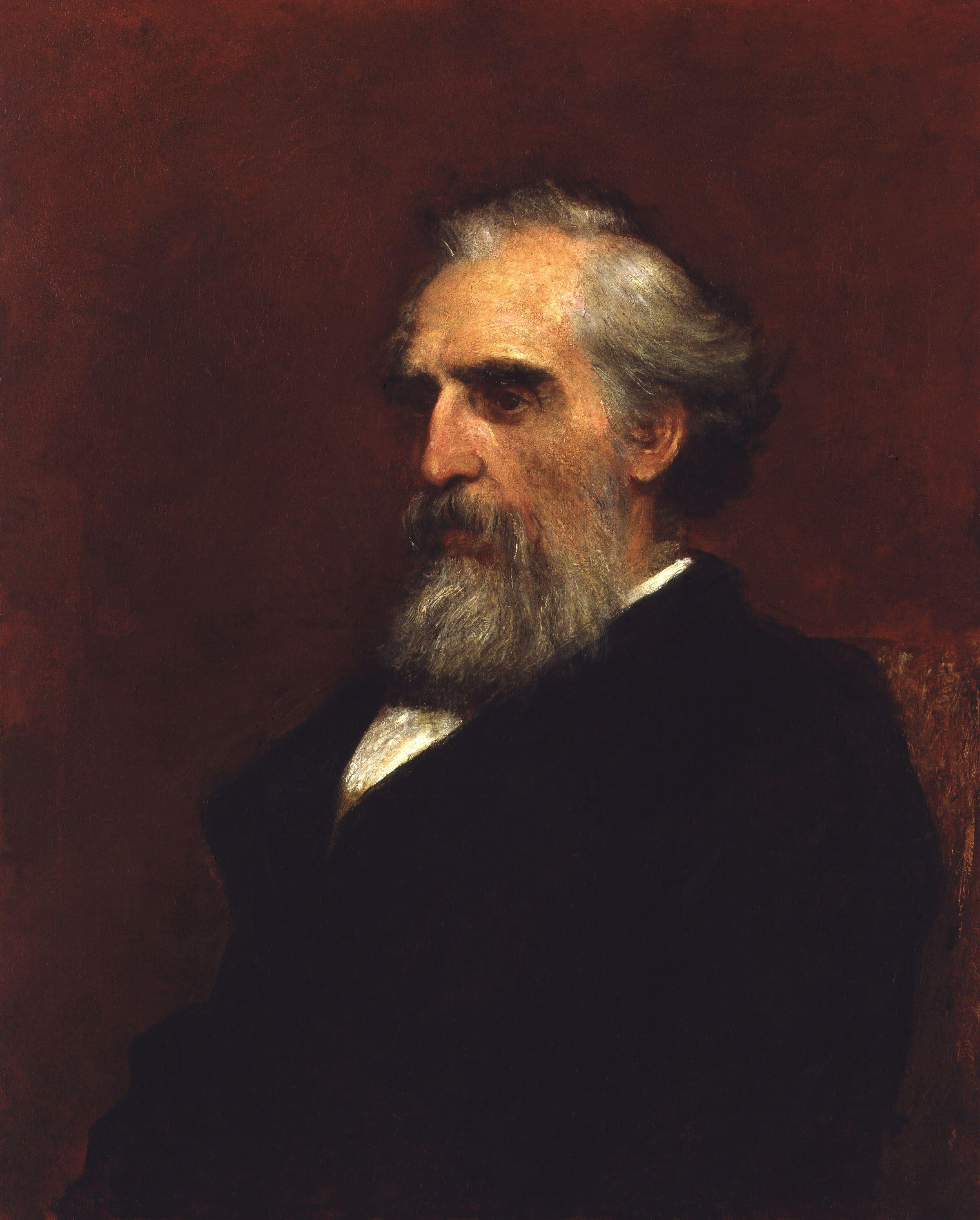
- Portrait of John Passmore Edwards by George Frederic Watts, 1894
- Born: 24 March 1823; Blackwater, Cornwall, England
- Died: 22 April 1911 (aged 88); Hampstead, London
- Occupation(s): journalist and philanthropist
- Title: Member of Parliament for Salisbury
- Term: 1880–1885

John Passmore Edwards (24 March 1823 – 22 April 1911) was a British journalist, newspaper owner, and philanthropist who briefly served as a Liberal Party Member of Parliament.

== Early life ==
According to his autobiography Passmore Edwards was born in Blackwater, a small village between Redruth and Truro in Cornwall, England. He had three brothers, William, Richard and James. His father was a Cornishman, a brewer by trade. His mother's maiden name was Passmore, and she had been born in Newton Abbot, Devon.

He reported that in his youth there were few books available to him, and they were mostly theological in nature. At age twelve, the first book he managed to purchase for himself was Newton's Opticks, and he declared that he "was just as wise at the end as I was at the beginning of reading it".

== Journalism ==
He became the Manchester representative of the London Sentinel, a weekly newspaper opposed to the Corn Law, in 1844 but the paper failed within a year. By 1845 he settled in London, supporting himself by freelance writing and lecturing in the cause of social reform.

His initial publishing ventures, including the widely read Public Good, were failures, bringing him to bankruptcy in 1853, but his 1862 purchase of The Building News and Engineering Journal (founded in 1854 as The Building News) led to profitability; this was followed by the twopenny weekly English Mechanic (subtitled and Mirror of Science and Art) and shareholding in the leading London newspaper The Echo, which he purchased in 1876. He eventually sold two-thirds of his share in The Echo to Andrew Carnegie to follow a political and social agenda. However, they disagreed and he bought it back and restored his editor in 1886. The paper closed in 1905. Ebeneezer J. Kibblewhite was longtime editor of The Building News and Architectural Journal.

In 1893 Francis Hughes-Hallett (a former MP who had defeated Passmore Edwards at Rochester in 1885) filed a lawsuit against Passmore Edwards and Kibblewhite, as proprietor and editor/printer of The Weekly Times and Echo, over an article in the paper that poked fun at his widely reported adultery. The article, published in the issue of 29 May 1892, included the lines

It is reported that Colonel Hughes-Hallett, formerly M.P. for Rochester, is going to honour the new Parliament with his presence if he can get returned. He should stand with Sir Charles Dilke for some double-barrelled constituency, where the electors are not particular, and then we should have a suitable champion of purity on each side of the House, in view of eventualities, Hallett and Dilke! Sodom and Gomorrah might have been proud of such a distinguished pair of representatives.

Hughes-Hallett claimed that the comparison of him to disgraced former MP Sir Charles Dilke and to say that the two should run together for the constituency of "Sodom and Gomorrah" constituted libel driven by personal malice. The defendants argued that since the press had already covered Hughes-Hallett's affairs extensively, they were not doing additional harm to his reputation. The jury found for the defendants.

== Politics ==
He was a delegate to the International Peace Congresses in Brussels, Paris and Frankfurt (from 1848 to 1850). He stood as a Liberal candidate for Truro in the general election of 1868 but was not elected. In the 1880 general election he gained a parliamentary seat in the two-member Salisbury constituency as a Liberal. Salisbury was reduced to one MP by the Redistribution of Seats Act 1885 and in the 1885 general election he stood unsuccessfully as a Liberal in Rochester.

He became somewhat sceptical about the quality of professional politics and the inability of politicians to effectively represent the interests of their constituents, and his opposition to the Second Boer War lost him some popularity.

He twice refused a knighthood.

== Philanthropy ==
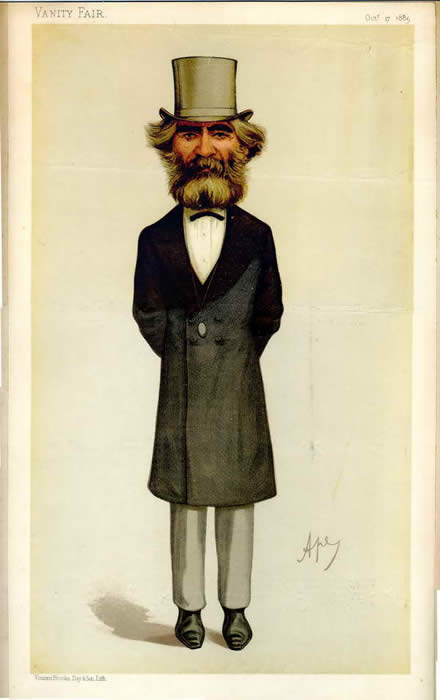
Passmore Edwards caricatured by Ape in Vanity Fair, 1885

A lifelong champion of the working classes, Passmore Edwards is remembered as a generous benefactor. Over the space of 14 years, 70 major buildings were established as a direct result of his bequests. These included hospitals, 11 drinking fountains, 32 marble busts, 24 libraries, schools, convalescence homes and art galleries and the Passmore Edwards Settlement (later called the Mary Ward Centre), which was originally located at Mary Ward House on Tavistock Place. He was also a generous donor to the Workers' Educational Association. Many of Passmore Edwards' buildings were designed by the architect Maurice Bingham Adams, who was also the editor of one of his journals, Building News.

In 1898 Passmore Edwards donated substantially to the Essex Local and Educational Museum of Natural History, which was later named the Passmore Edwards Museum.

He also gave money to many hospitals including the Passmore Edwards District Cottage Hospital, next to Tilbury Dock, Essex, where he built a ward which was named after him. Wards in Wembley Cottage Hospital and Willesden General were also named after him. He also donated his earnings to a fountain in Hoxton Square, Shoreditch, London. This fountain is regularly frequented by the local community and is considered a historical landmark in an area that finds itself becoming detached from its history.

Passmore Edwards was a leading Freemason, and a founder in 1906 of the Standard Chapter of Improvement, which sought to simplify and unify the incoherent rituals of the Holy Royal Arch degree. He was a teetotaller and vegetarian.

== Legacy ==
Many of the buildings that he paid for are still in use for their original purpose. A bust of Passmore Edwards by Sir George Frampton was rescued from the basement of Hoxton Library and unveiled in May 2007 at the Passmore Edwards Library in St Ives, Cornwall.

As well as London libraries such as at East Dulwich and Edmonton, he gave the public library buildings in Devon at Newton Abbot and in Cornwall at Bodmin, Camborne, Falmouth, Launceston, Liskeard, Penzance, Redruth, St Ives and Truro.

The Passmore Edwards Public Library in Shepherd's Bush, London, is now the home of the Bush Theatre, which moved there in October 2011.

The Passmore Edwards Public Library in Borough Road, London, has been refurbished by London South Bank University and houses the university's apprenticeships and a coffee shop.

The Epilepsy Society's main administrative office is sited at Passmore Edwards House, a Grade II listed building in Chalfont St Peter, Buckinghamshire.

The Passmore Edwards Centre in Newton Abbot was erected 1902-1904 in memory of Passmore Edwards' mother.

== Gallery ==
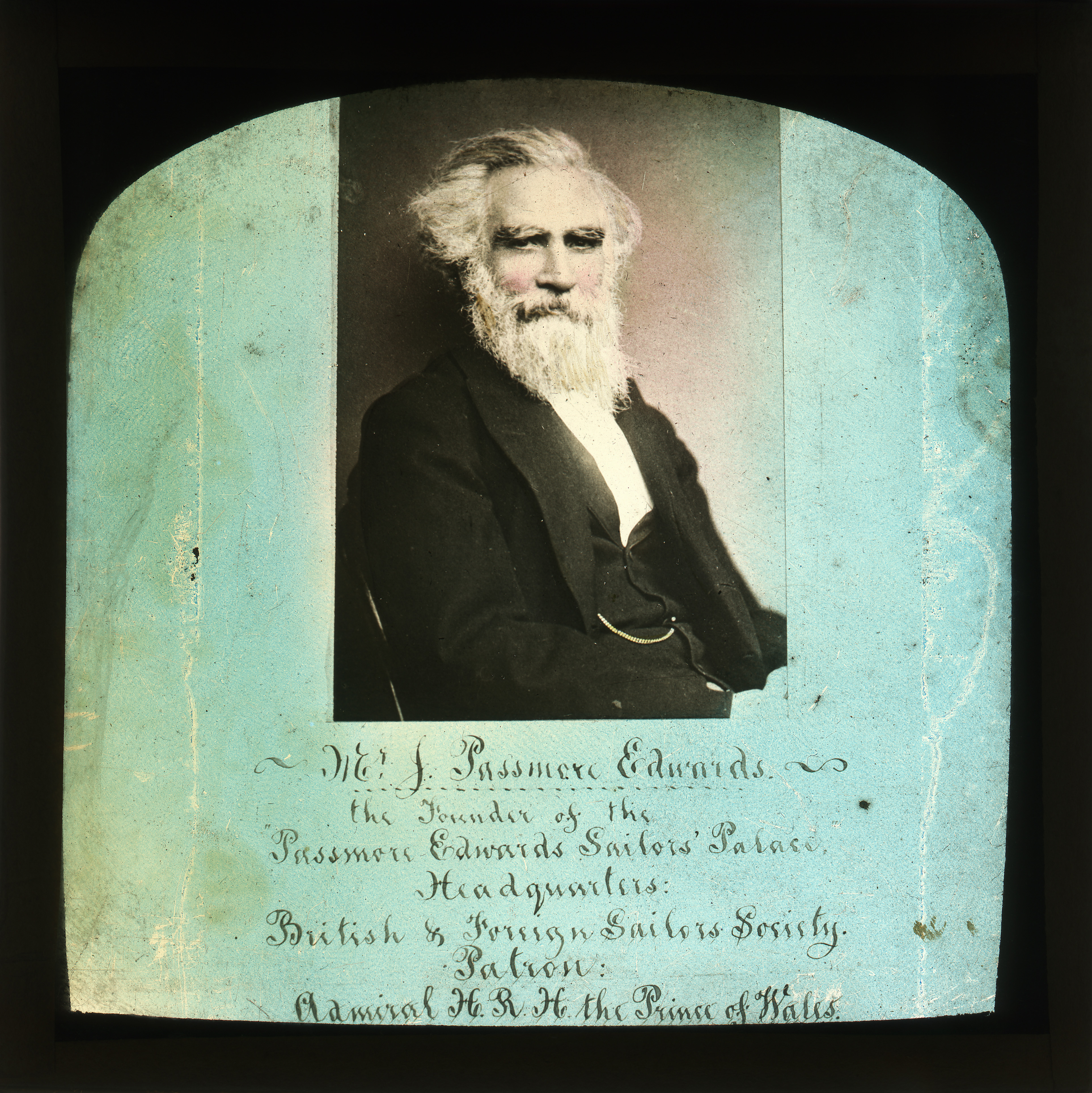
Photograph (1910) of Passmore Edwards

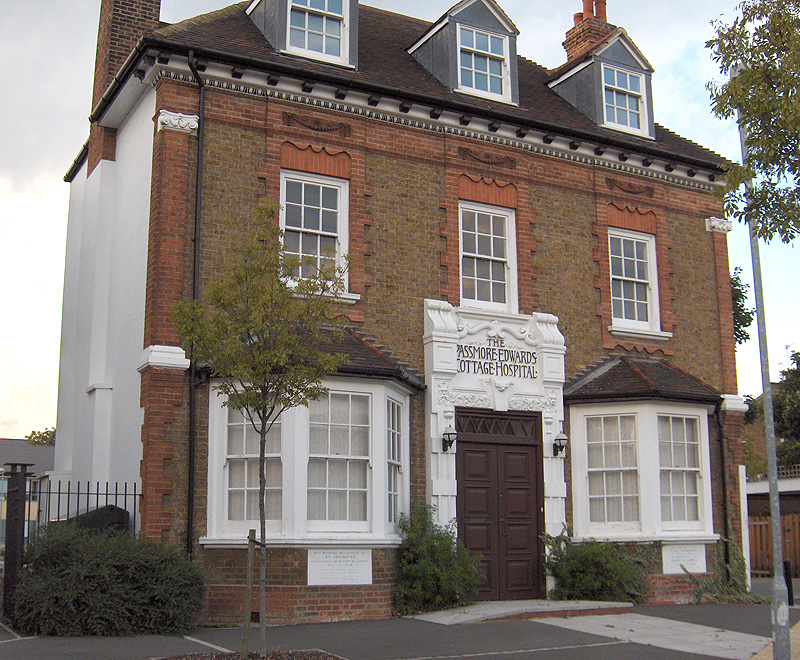
Passmore Edwards Cottage Hospital in Acton, London, built c. 1900, is an example of Passmore Edwards' philanthropy

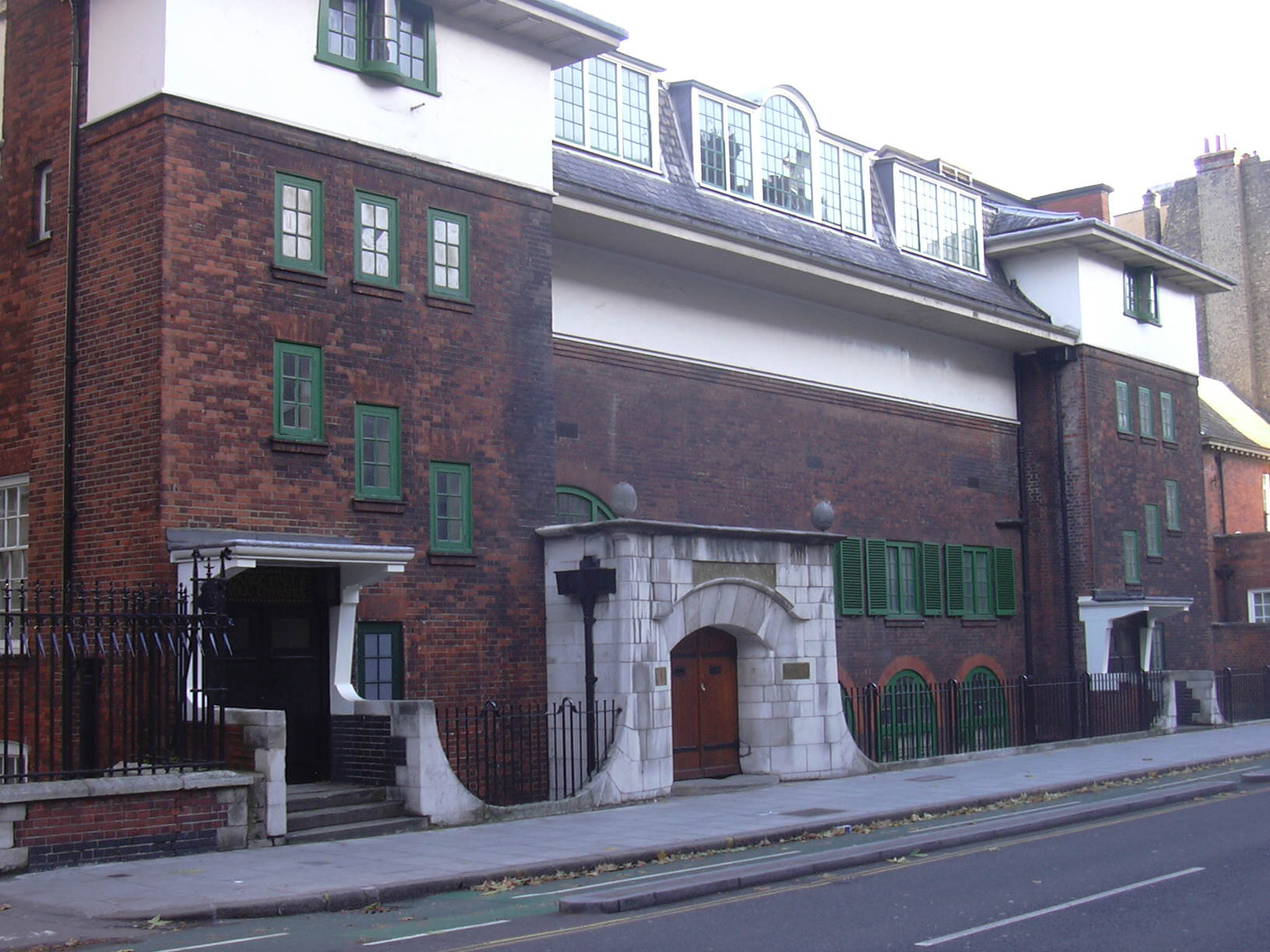
Passmore Edwards Settlement building, now Mary Ward House, Tavistock Place

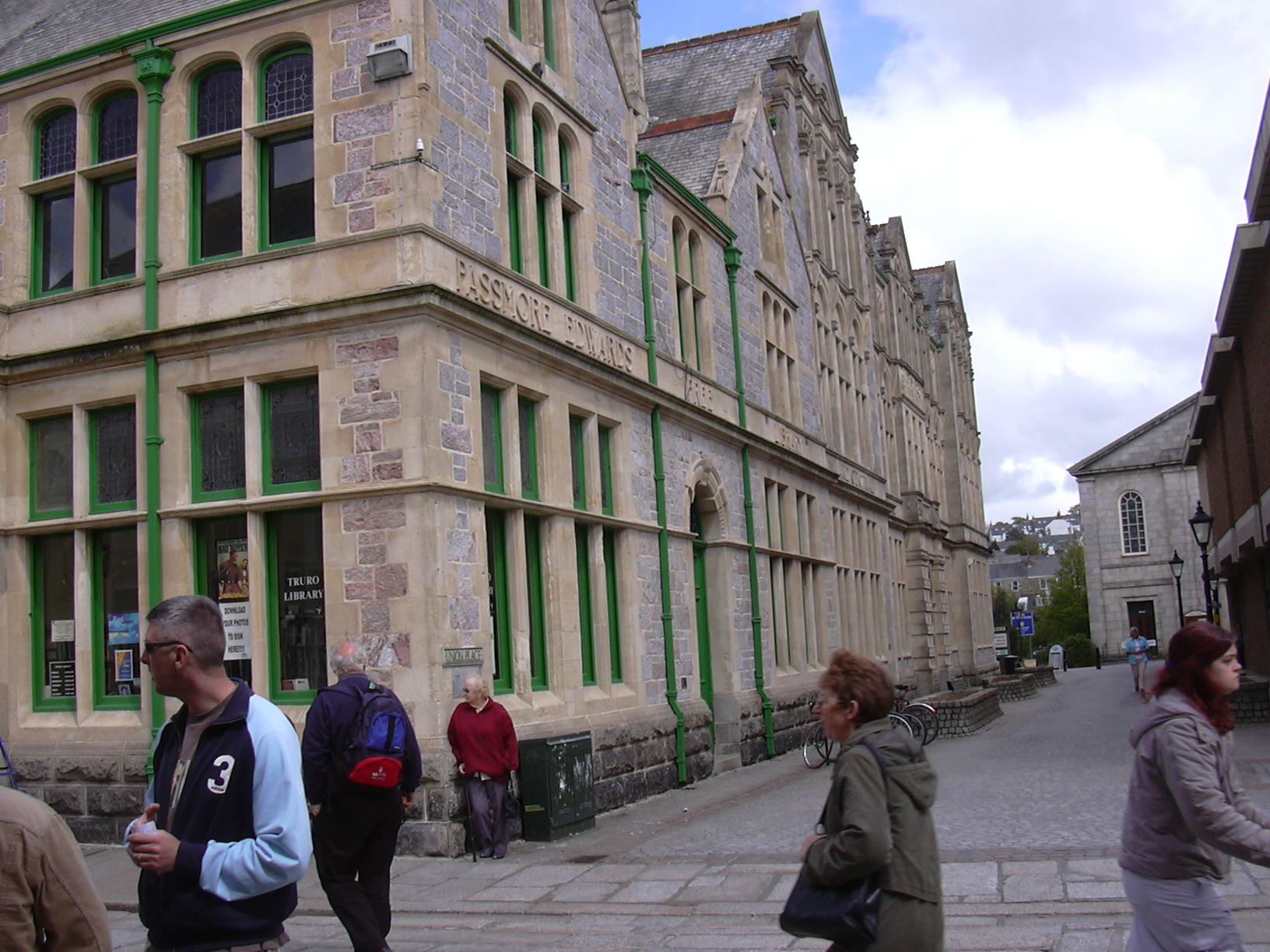
Truro Public Library and Technical School

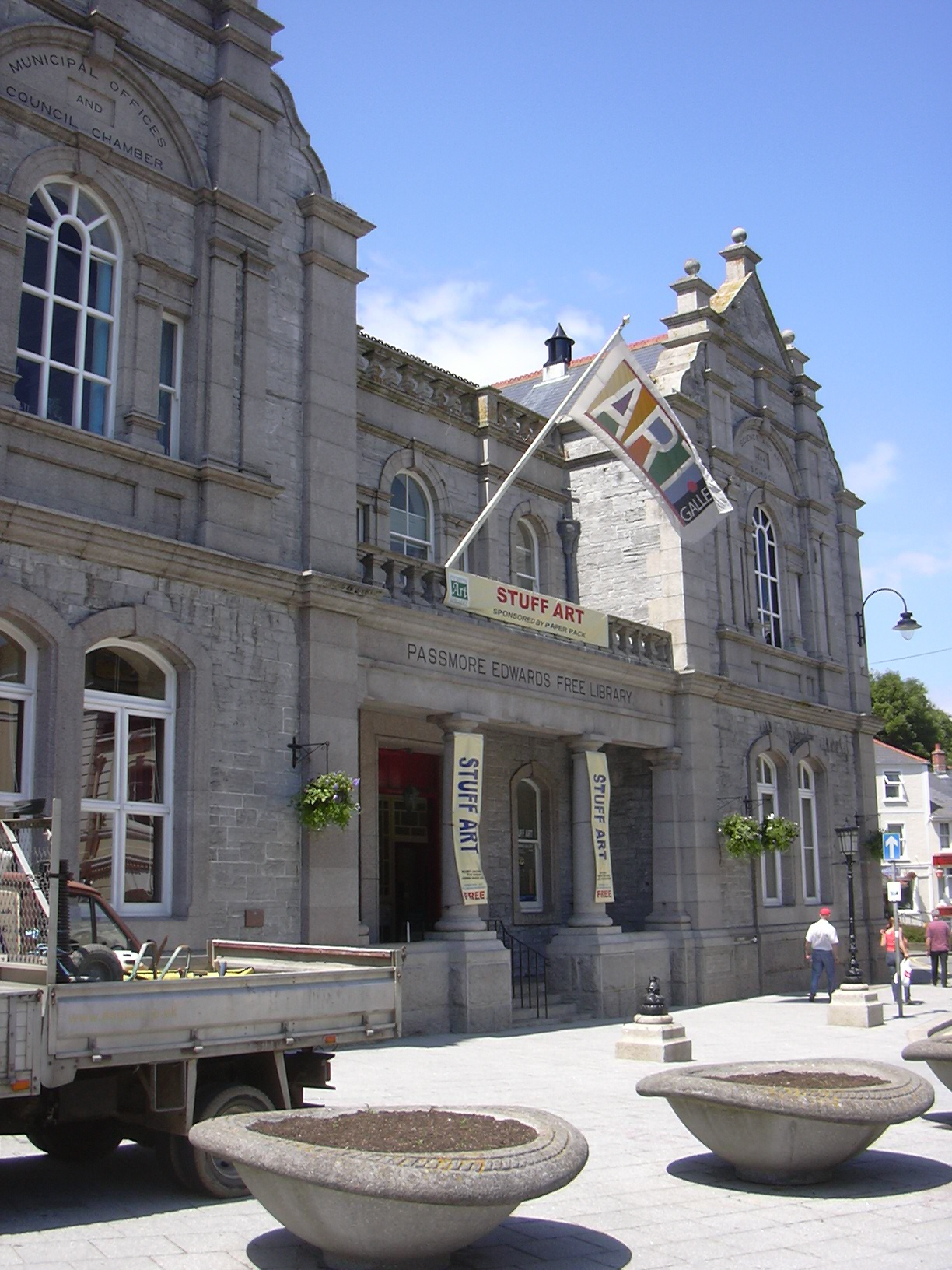
Falmouth Public Library and Art Gallery

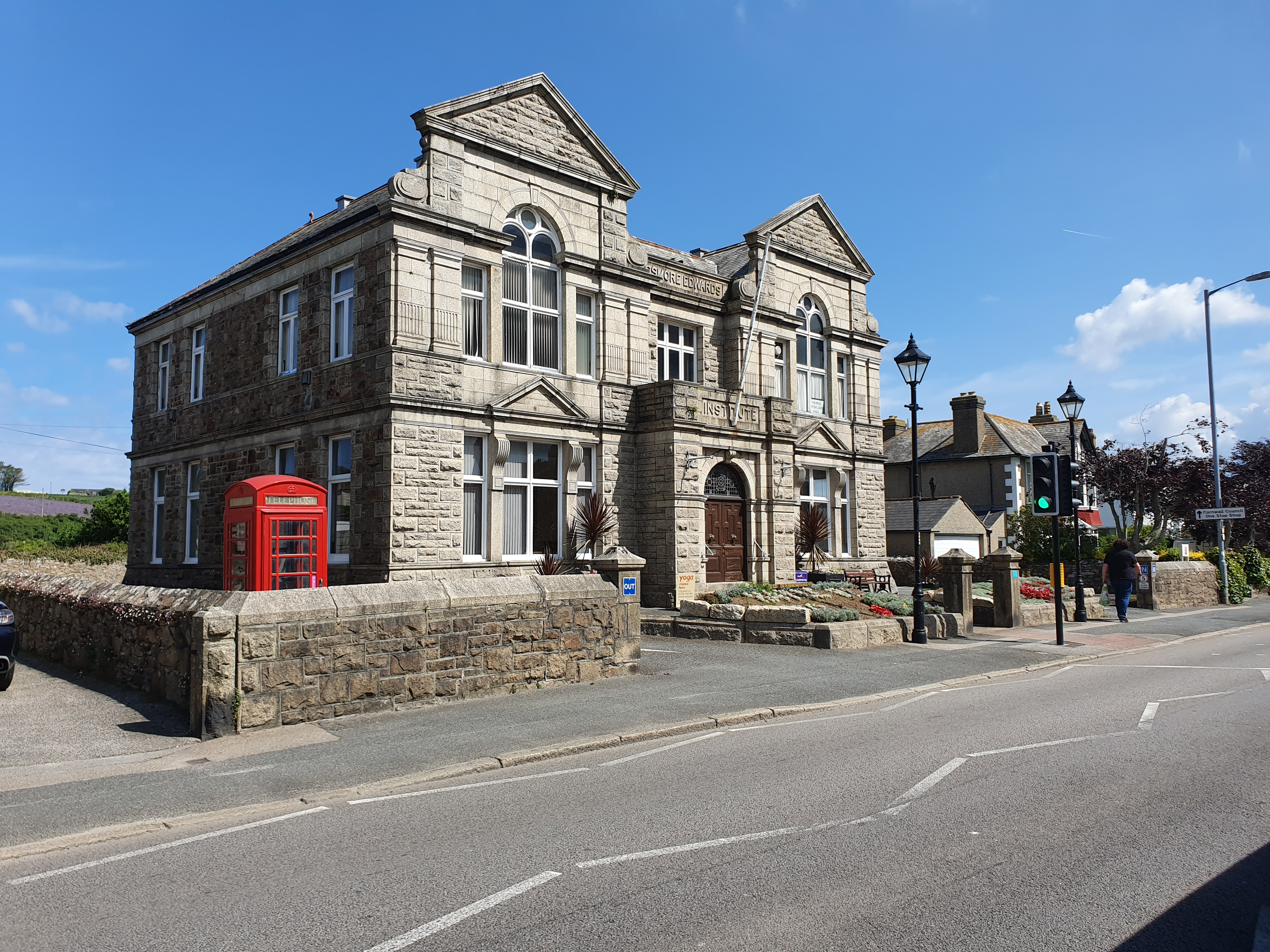
Hayle Institute, Hayle, Cornwall

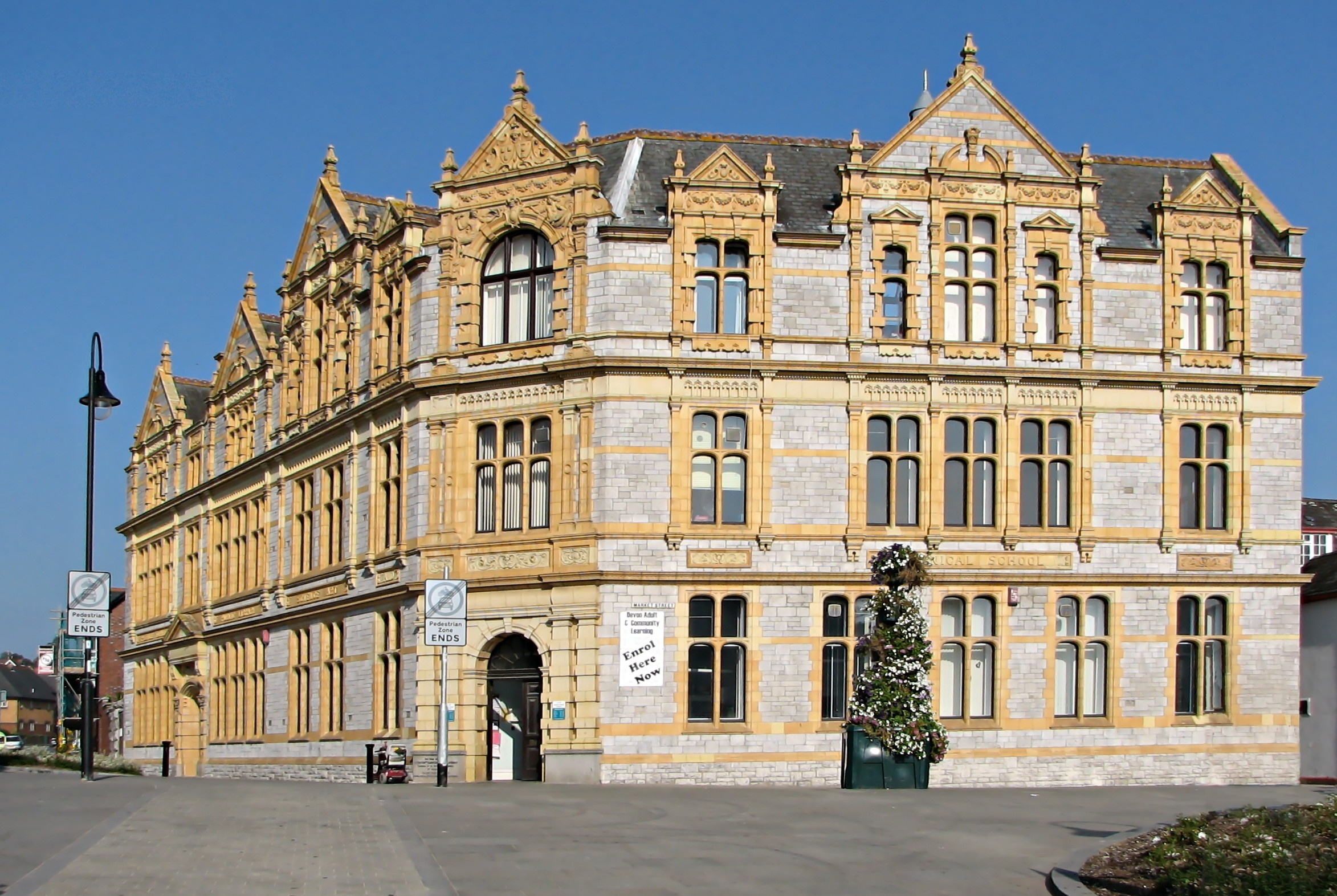
Newton Abbot Library

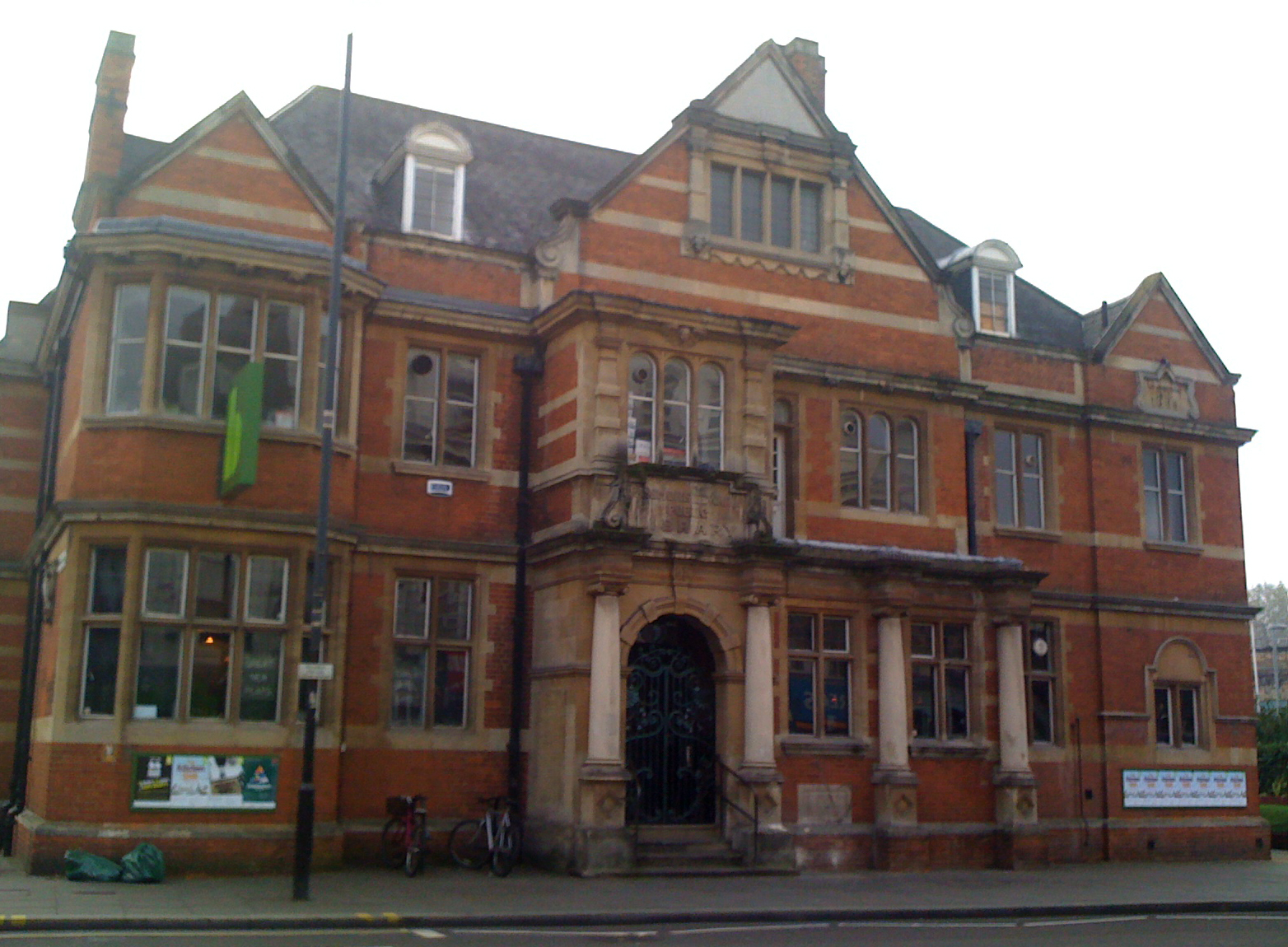
Passmore Edwards Public Library in Shepherd's Bush

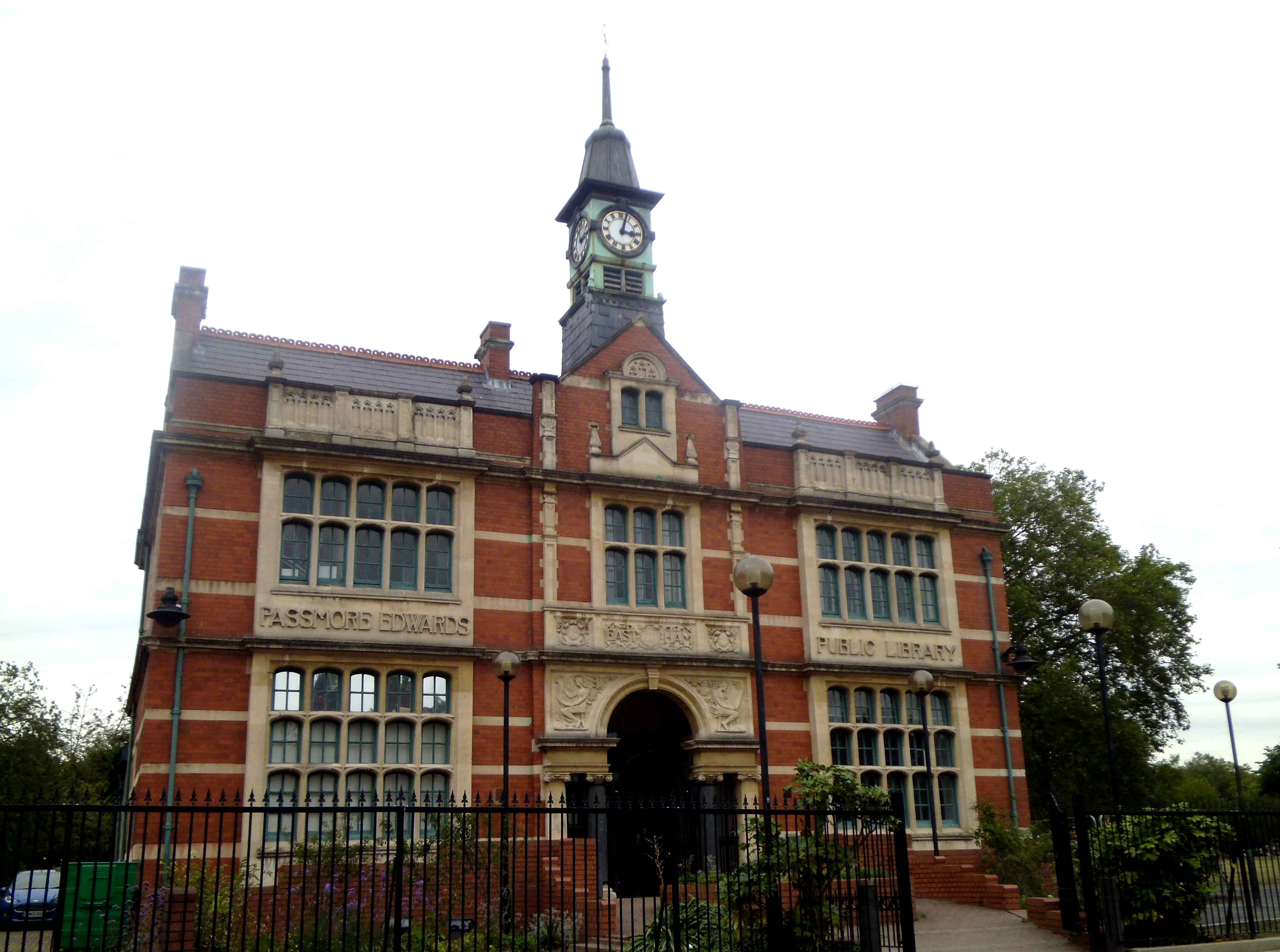
Passmore Edwards Public Library, East Ham, London; now Newham register office

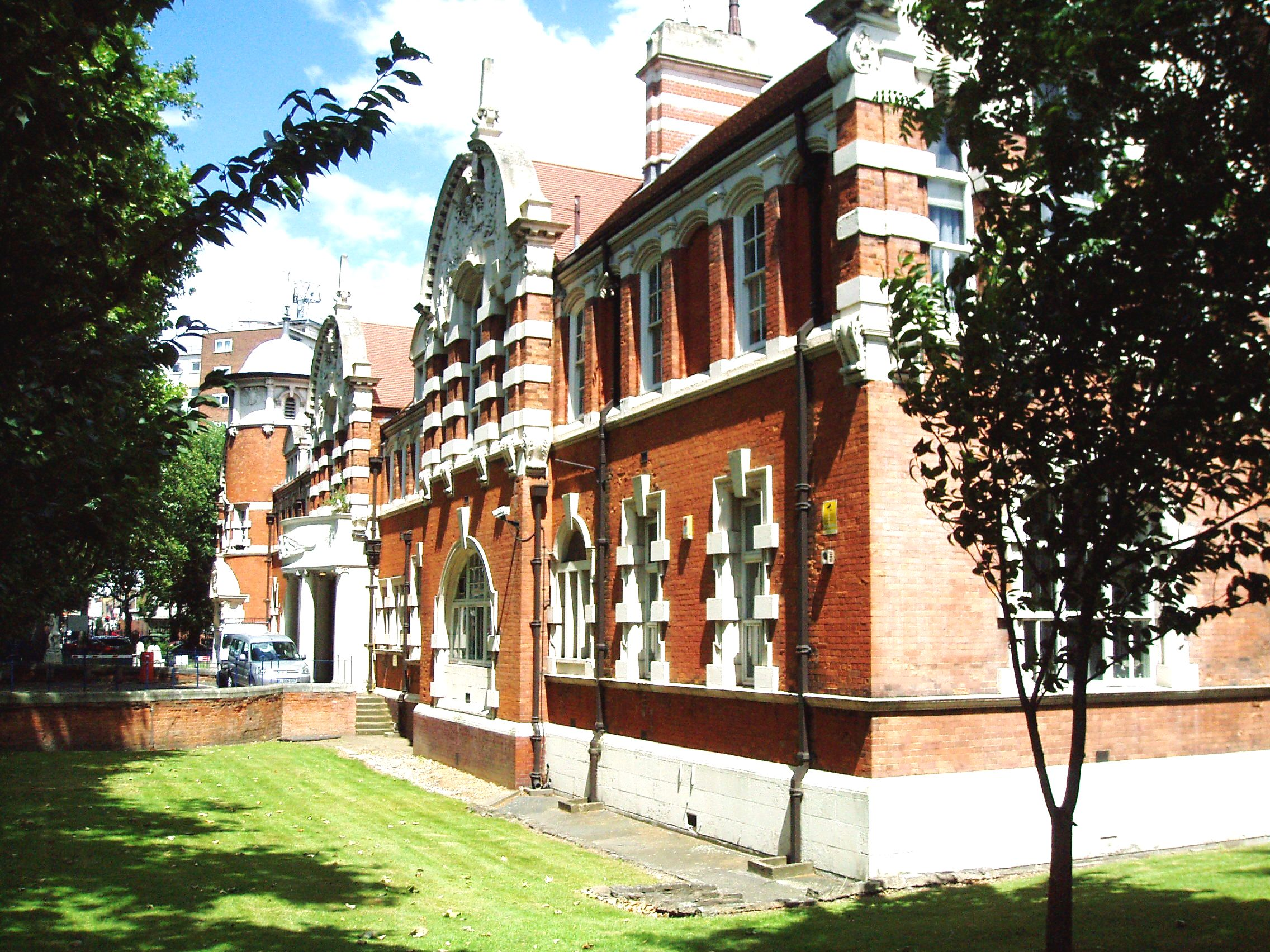
West Ham Technical Institute and the Passmore Edwards Museum, West Ham, London, 1900. Now used as the University of East London and its student union respectively. Passmore Edwards opened the college in 1900, which he described as the `People's University'

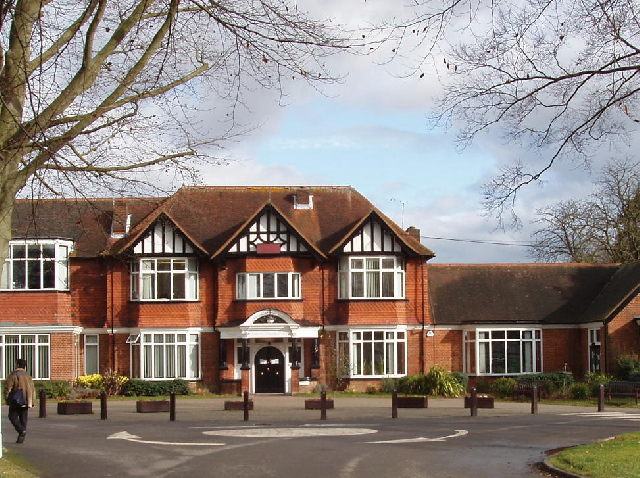
Passmore Edwards House, Chalfont St Peter, Buckinghamshire; the main offices for Epilepsy Society

== Bibliography ==
- Baynes, Peter John Passmore Edwards 1823-1911: an account of his life and works, P. A. Baynes (1995) ISBN 0-9526231-0-2
- Best, R. S. The Life and Good Works of John Passmore Edwards, with pen and ink illustrations by C. M. Pellow and a list of Buildings, sponsored by Edwards, their architects and opening dates, with an appendix on the architect Silvanus Trevail, [(1851–1903), who designed nine of them. Dyllansow Truran (1982) ISBN 0-907566-18-9
- Burrage, E. H. J Passmore Edwards, Philanthropist (1902)
- Edwards, J. Passmore A Few Footprints (1906)
- Evans, Dean, Funding the Ladder: the Passmore Edwards legacy, 2011 (Francis Boutle Publishers, London) ISBN 978-1-903427-66-8
- Ewing, Heather, The Passmore Edwards Public Libraries in London: A Study in Patronage and the Development of a Typology, unpublished thesis (Courtauld Institute of Art, London, 1998)
- MacDonald, J. J. Passmore Edwards Institutions, Strand Newspaper Company (1900)

Parliament of the United Kingdom
Preceded by Granville Ryder; John Alfred Lush	Member of Parliament for Salisbury; 1880–1885; With: William Grenfell (1880–1882); Coleridge Kennard (1882–1885)	Succeeded by William Grenfell
