= Passmore Edwards District Cottage Hospital =

Former hospital in Tilbury, England

Passmore Edwards District Cottage Hospital, Tilbury, Essex, also known as Tilbury and Grays District Cottage Hospital, was a hospital in Tilbury, Essex.

== History ==
The hospital was one of several cottage hospitals funded by John Passmore Edwards, a wealthy philanthropist, journalist, newspaper owner and Member of Parliament. In 1894 Tilbury had a population of 14,000, a busy dock, but no hospital. Passmore Edwards agreed to contribute £2000 towards the construction of a cottage hospital. He was asked to lay the foundation stone in October 1895, the hospital opened in 1896, and was enlarged in 1900-1901. The hospital Chairman was Sidney Holland who had just joined the management committee of The London Hospital, in Whitechapel, and was also Chairman of Poplar Hospital. The hospital closed in 1969 and hospital provision was taken over by Orsett Hospital, now Basildon and Thurrock University Hospitals NHS Foundation Trust.

== Notable staff ==
The first two matrons both trained at The London Hospital under Matron Eva Luckes.

- Caroline Myra Watson (1856-1948), Matron 1896-1915. Watson trained between 1889-1891 and stayed on to work as a staff nurse afterwards. In 1895 she moved to Poplar Hospital as a Sister. As hospital Chairman, Holland oversaw the selection of a matron for the new hospital and appointed Watson without advertising the position.
- Anna Cornelia Jeppsen (1880-1951), Matron 1915- until at least 1918. Jeppsen trained between 1910-1912. After her training she stayed on as a staff nurse and undertook Midwifery training before becoming matron in Tilbury.
