= Blackwater, Cornwall =

Village in Cornwall, England

Coordinates: 50.2699°N 5.1799°W

Blackwater: Cornish: Dowrdu
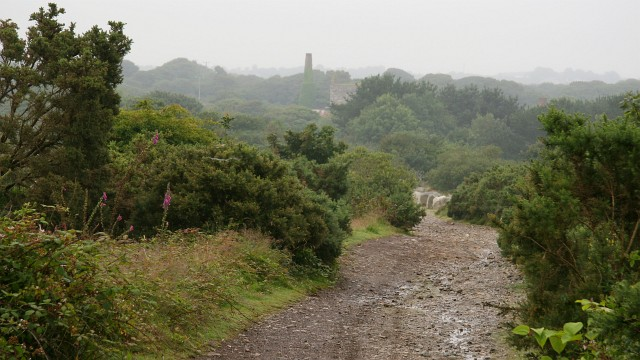
- A Cornish Mining Walk, Blackwater, Cornwall

- Location within Cornwall
- OS grid reference: SW736461
- Unitary authority: Cornwall
- Shire county: Cornwall
- Ceremonial county: Cornwall
- Region: South West
- Country: England
- Sovereign state: United Kingdom
- Post town: Truro
- Postcode district: TR4
- Police: Devon and Cornwall
- Fire: Cornwall
- Ambulance: South Western
- UK Parliament: Truro & Falmouth

Blackwater (Cornish: Dowrdu) is a village in Cornwall, England, United Kingdom. It is situated in the parish of St Agnes between Truro and Redruth. The village lies on the old course of the A30 north of the current course which bypasses it. The village has a primary school (built in 1877) which serves the village and surrounding settlements.

== History ==
Over the course of Blackwater's history, the village has supported four public houses: Clinton House, Cornish Miners Inn, The Red Lion and The Spread Eagle. The Truro and Newquay Railway (1903–1963) crossed through Blackwater. A station building was located south of Presingoll Barns near St Agnes. In 1972 the railway bridge was destroyed.

== Geology ==
In an 1824 published geological study, 19th-century Blackwell was described as follows: "Descending into a little valley at Blackwater, slate and compact rock present themselves in a section afforded by a ravine. In this valley cultivated fields and a few trees gladden the eye; but this oasis is of little extent; for a steep ascent leads again to the common, which extends as far as Chasewater, over rocks of the same character of..." bright red remains of mining operations.

== Wheal Concord ==
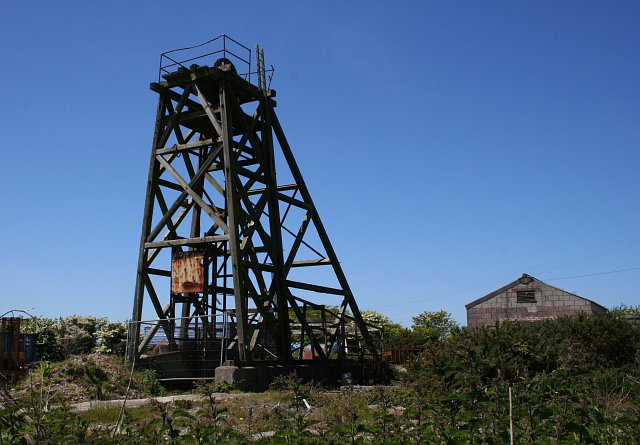
Wheal Concord headgear for the mine that was reopened in 1980, visited by the Duke of Cornwall in 1981, and closed in 1986 after the tin market crash of 1985

Commonly known as Wheal Concord, Wheal Concord and Wheal Briton mines are located on the road between Blackwater North Hill and Skinner's Bottom. The founding dates of the mines are unknown, but they both closed (Note: Wheal Briton closed in 1791.) and joined forces when they reopened in 1810. The Wheal Concord Silver, Lead and Copper Mining Company Limited was formed in 1860, but due to a drop in the tin market, the mining company closed a few years later. Regarding the late 19th-century fall of tin prices, Herbert Thomas said of St Agnes mining in his 1896 "Cornish Mining Interviews":

I can remember about 14 or 15 mines at work. But after tin fell seriously in 1874 the number began to diminish. Now the only mines at work are West Kitty, Wheal Kitty, Polberro and Blue Hills. Wheal Friendly cannot battle with hard times any longer and is about to be wound up…

— Herbert Thomas, journalist

In 1980 Nicholas Warrell, having secured £500,000 in investment monies, and Jack Trounson reopened the mines and produced 21,000 tonnes of tin. The year after opening they received a visit from Prince Charles. The mine was only open for a few years, but they had extracted all that they could with their contributors' investments. Wheal Concord was unable to secure the investment of £4,000,000 for machinery and resources to access resources deeper underground and had to close their business in 1986. The mine closed in November 1982.

== Religion ==
The 18th-century Methodist chapel in Blackwater was a simple, earth-floored building where women and men sat on different sides of the chapel. This chapel succumbed to a fire in 1821. The Blackwater Methodist Church was completed in 1825, added a gallery in 1832 and received a pipe organ in 1923. Since the church closed in 1985 it has been used as a home and for business purposes.

The Sunday School building, built with the funding and support of John Passmore Edwards was completed in 1893 and dedicated to Edward's late uncle, a St Day Sunday school superintendent and teacher. It was a stone building with granite dressings. Gothic cathedral glass and leadlight windows adorned the building.

== Education ==
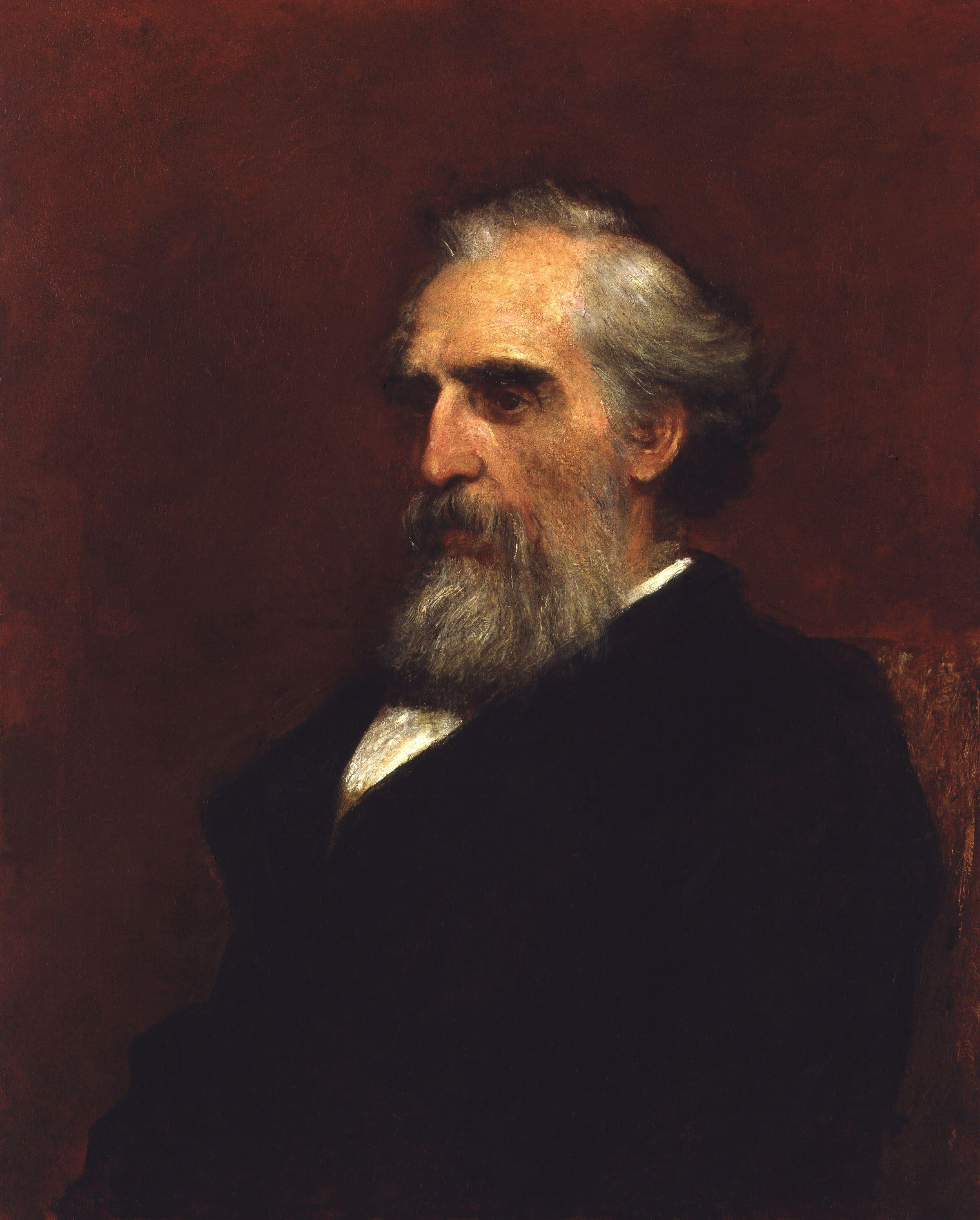
George Frederic Watts, John Passmore Edwards, 1894, National Portrait Gallery, London

The local Blackwater Community Primary School provides services for infants, children 3–5 and juniors. The school facilities include a sports field, wild area and greenhouse.

Commonly known as the Blackwater Lecture and Reading Room, the Blackwater Institute was founded in 1890 by John Passmore Edwards who was born in Blackwater. This was the first of many donated public buildings by Edwards. He also financed the construction of the Mithian Village Hall, St Agnes village Miners' and Mechanics' Institute and 69 other public buildings. Edwards was a successful newspaper owner but his beginnings were humble. The idea for the institute sprouted from a request for books for Blackwater's citizens by the Reverend of the Mithian church, Fursdon Rogers. Based upon the Reverend's request and his own memories of having joined the Chacewater Reading Society to access reading material, Edwards decided to build a building for educational study.

Lord Falmouth donated the land and the Tywarnhale estate donated the stone for the building. James Prowse & Son created the masonry work and the exterior was decorated by Mr Craze and Solomon & Company. John Symons and his son, Frank, designed and decorated the building; the elder Symons was a school mate of Edwards. Two rooms were separated by a wooden divider that could be moved for large gatherings like concerts. The building has also been used for local meetings, County Technical Instruction Committee classes, men's snooker club and the 1920 Coroner's inquest into the unsolved double murder of Joseph Hoare and Laura Sara.

== Amenities ==
The Red Lion Public House is the village pub.

== Notable people ==
The Victorian philanthropist and journalist John Passmore Edwards was born here. He had the Blackwater Institute built within a few hundred yards of the site of the cottage of his birth and youth.

== In popular culture ==
- Carlton Television's Murder Most Foul television series featured a story of the unsolved 1920 murder of Laura Sara and her common law husband Joseph Charles Hoare at their "Seaview Cottage".
