= Tilbury (band) =

Icelandic rock band

- Origin: Reykjavík, Iceland
- Genres: Folk rock
- Years active: 2010–present
- Labels: Record Records
- Members: Þormóður Dagsson; Kristinn Evertsson; Örn Eldjárn; Guðmundur Óskar Guðmundsson; Magnús Trygvason Eliassen

Tilbury is an Icelandic rock band with folk influences founded in the summer of 2010. It started as a personal musical project by singer Þormóður Dagsson called Formaður Dagsbrúnar. He had been a drummer in Skakkamange, Jeff Who? and Hudson Wayne.

As the project developed he formed the band Tilbury, with experienced musicians. Kristinn Evertsson from Valdimar on synthesizers, the guitarist Örn Eldjárn who was in Brother Grass, and bass player Guðmundur Óskar Guðmundsson from Hjaltalin. The drummer Magnús Trygvason Eliassen has also played on Sin Fang, Amiina and Moses Hightower. Based on the depth of musical talent, Icelandic media has dubbed the project a supergroup.

Tilbury has released three albums, the debut Exorcise released on 7 May 2012 followed by Northern Comfort in January 2014. After 9 years, Tilbury released their third album So Overwhelming on 14 April 2023.

== Members ==
- Þormóður Dagsson - lead vocals - [ Skakkamange, Jeff Who? and Hudson Wayne ]
- Kristinn Evertsson - synthesizers - [ Valdimar ]
- Örn Eldjárn - guitar - [ Brother Grass ]
- Guðmundur Óskar - bass - [ Hjaltalin ]
- Magnús Trygvason Eliassen - drums [ Sin Fang, Amiina and Moses Hightower ]

== Discography ==
=== Albums ===
- 2012: Exorcise
- 2014: Northern Comfort
- 2023: So Overwhelming

=== Singles ===
- 2012: "Tenderloin"
- 2014: "Northern Comfort"
- 2022: "Skylights"
- 2022: "Feel This"
