= Tilbury Band =

English brass band

The Tilbury Band
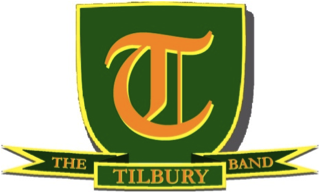

Background information
- Origin: Tilbury, England, United Kingdom; Tilbury Railwaymens' Band; Tilbury Town Silver Band; Tilbury Silver Band; RM18 7BX
- Genres: Classical
- Occupations: Brass band
- Years active: June 1919–present
- Members: Musical Director; Melvin White
- Website: www.tilburyband.co.uk

The Tilbury Band is an English-based brass band, founded in 1919 by the Tilbury Branch of the National Union of Railwaymen. In 2011, the band became a second section contesting brass band.

== Early history ==
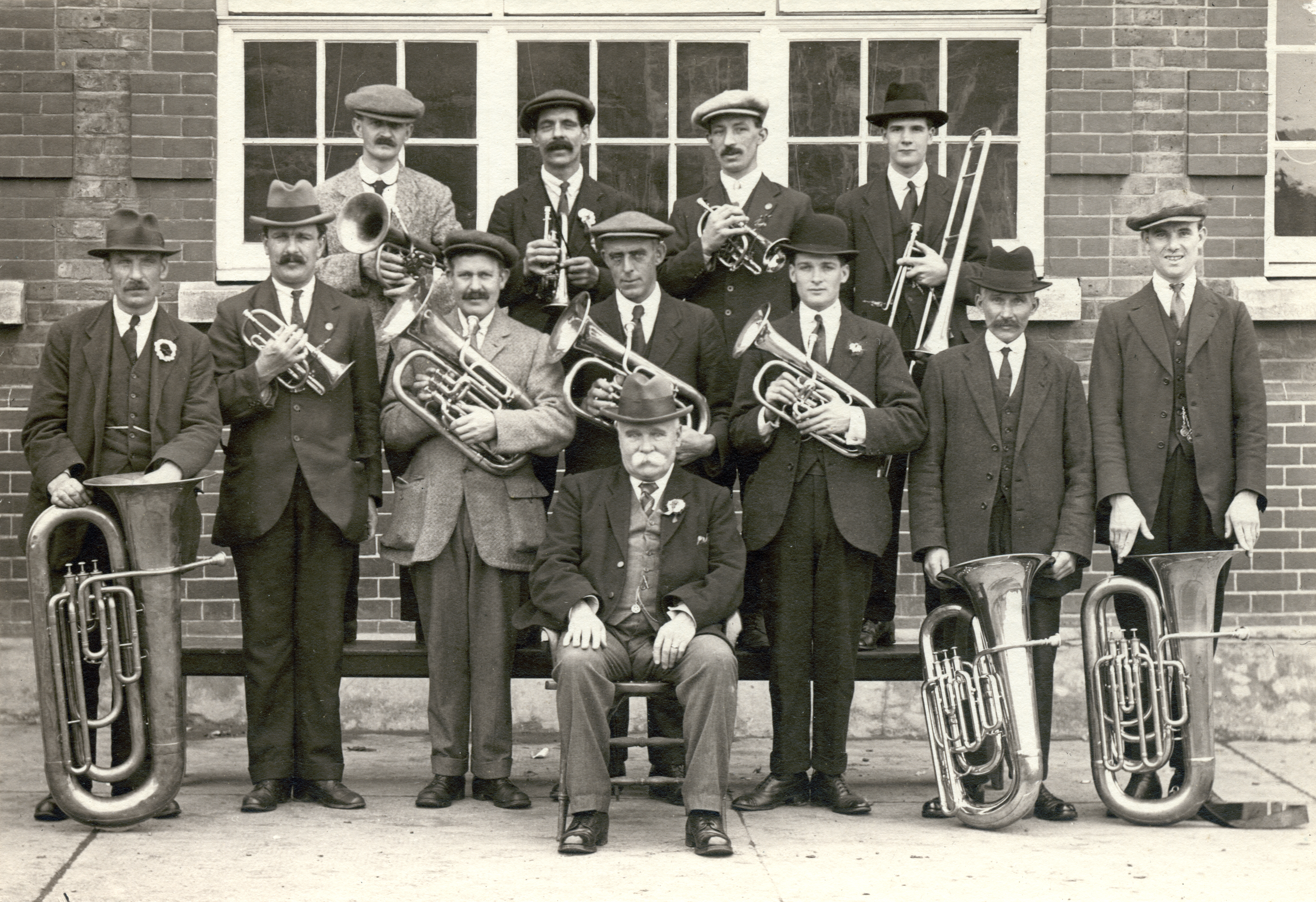
Tilbury Railwaymens Band, circa 1919

On 28 May 1919 a meeting of the Tilbury Branch of the National Union of Railwaymen was held. At this meeting it was proposed and agreed to form a brass band. By 1 July the Tilbury Railwaymen's Band had called its first meeting and two delegates were appointed to travel to Shoeburyness (near Southend-on-Sea) to view a set of 24 instruments. On the next meeting night 47 members were in attendance. As only one bandsman (Mr H. Jones) could play an instrument he was appointed as Band Master. As candidates stepped forward for instruments it was discovered that 30 wanted to play the big drum.

In August 1920, Mr. Snelling was appointed as Bandmaster, and Mr. Jones joined the playing ranks of the band. At the band's AGM in January 1921 the decision was made to purchase the band their first set of new instruments from Hawkes & Sons (now Boosey & Hawkes) in London. On these, it was said, the band made favourable progress. At the half yearly meeting in July, owing to the repeated request of supporters in the town, it was decided to alter the name to The Tilbury Town Band.

February 1922 saw a contest for local bands held at Grays. Wishing to gain a conductor with contest experience, Mr. G Nicholls of Grays Temperance Band was engaged. After five weeks tuition the band mounted the contesting platform for the first time securing second prize and two medals. (Out of the five bands, all the others were over twenty years old). Following success at grays it was decided to pay a visit to what is now known as the National Brass Band Championship of Great Britain, held at The Crystal Palace. It was, however, not until 1923 that the band made a success at the Crystal Palace contest, securing third prize in the Junior section B, competing against twenty seven bands from all over the British Isles.

December 1922 saw the band purchase their first set of 33 uniforms from The Uniform Clothing & Equipment Co.

== WWII suspension and a new home ==
During the Second World War, the band's activities were suspended, but it was quickly reformed when peace 'broke out' in 1945. Four years later (on 24 March 1949) the band purchased an old Salvation Army hall (in Dock Road, Tilbury) for £225. This became the new band headquarters. In the 1960s, the band changed name again, to the present name "The Tilbury Band".

In 1976, the original band hall was demolished to make way for a new purpose-built headquarters at the cost of £22,000. This hall is the one still used by the band today. The band's 50th anniversary was achieved in 1969 with a large-scale concert at Thurrock's Civic Hall in Grays, with the planned soloist of Derek Garside. Due to illness, Mr. Garside was unable to attend and instead persuaded Maurice Murphy to attend as soloist in his stead.

== Recent history ==
During the 1970s and '80s, the band made the finals of the National Brass Band Championships of Great Britain three times, coming third in the second section in 1978 (under the baton of Melvin White). The band were promoted to the Championship Section. The Youth Band under the direction of Michael Stroud, were the Butlins National Youth Champions and finalists in the Pontins National Youth Championship.

On St. Patrick's Day (17 March), 2001 the band went to the London & Southern Counties qualifying round of the second section at Stevenage. Under the direction of Robert Nunnery they walked away with first prize and an invitation to the national finals in Preston in September 2001. In 2008, the Tilbury Band officially appointed a new conductor and director of music in Alan Duguid, who remained position until the appointment of Andrew Austin in 2011.

The Tilbury Band met their centenary in 2019 with a concert at the London International Cruise Terminal in Tilbury Docks. At that time, the band did not have a regular musical director and the band was coached by Melvin White, with the concert conducted by former member and internationally acclaimed conductor Spencer Down.

On 19 March 2022, the Tilbury Band achieved great success securing second place in the London & Southern Counties Regional Contest ("The Area") of the National Brass Band Championships of Great Britain, under the baton of musical director Melvin White, with the band receiving an invitation to attend the National Brass Band Championships Final in Cheltenham in September 2022.
