= Tilbury =

Port town in Essex, England

Coordinates: 51.4606°N 0.3582°E

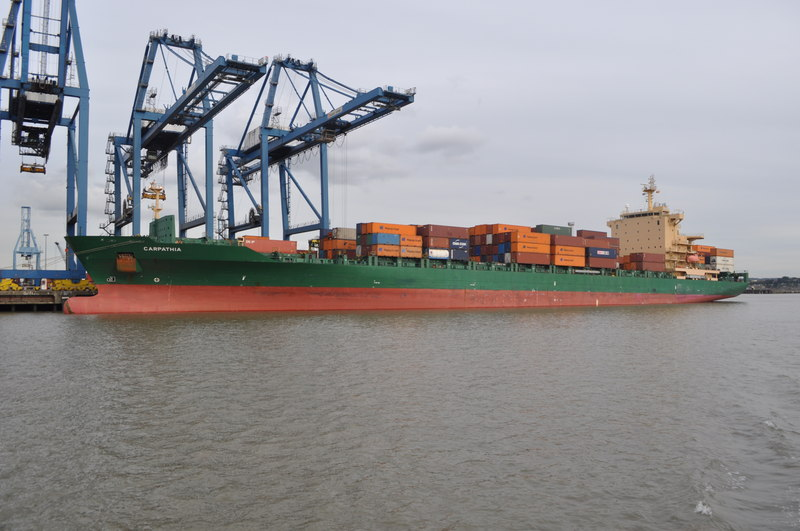
- The Port of Tilbury

- Location within Essex
- Population: 14,185 (Built up area, 2021)
- OS grid reference: TQ639761
- Unitary authority: Thurrock
- Ceremonial county: Essex
- Region: East
- Country: England
- Sovereign state: United Kingdom
- Post town: TILBURY
- Postcode district: RM18
- Dialling code: 01375
- Police: Essex
- Fire: Essex
- Ambulance: East of England
- UK Parliament: Thurrock

Tilbury (or Tilbury Town) is a port town on the north bank of the Thames in the borough of Thurrock in Essex, England. The town was established as separate settlement near East and West Tilbury and Tilbury Fort in the late 19th century, on land that was mainly part of the parish of Chadwell St Mary. The Gravesend–Tilbury Ferry was an ancient and important crossing point. Tilbury is part of the Port of London with a major deep-water port which contributes to the local economy. It lies 24 miles (39 km) east of central London and adjoins the town of Grays. It is the southernmost point in Essex. At the 2021 census the Tilbury built up area had a population of 14,185.

== Etymology ==
The name of the present town of Tilbury is derived (by way of the port) from the nearby settlements of East and West Tilbury. The name of these settlements is derived from the Saxon burgh, "fortified place", either belonging to Tila, or perhaps at a lowland place. The 8th century spelling (Bede) was "Tilaburg", and the spelling in Domesday was "Tilberia". The town is alternatively known as Tilbury Town to distinguish it from East and West Tilbury.

== History ==
Tilbury's history is closely connected with its geographical location (see below). Its counterpart on the south bank of the River Thames, Gravesend, has long been an important communications link, and it was there that a cross-river ferry (see below) was connected, mainly due to the narrowness of the river at this point. In addition, Gravesend and Northfleet (also on the south shore) both became vitally important to shipping on the Thames: the former as the first port of call for foreign shipping bound for London, and the latter as a naval dockyard.

There is archaeological evidence of Roman occupation. At the time, sea-levels had dropped, making the marshes habitable. There may well have been a Roman settlement on the site of what is now Tilbury Docks. In the 12th century the river, which had hitherto consisted of difficult channels with uncharted shoals, was changed by the process of embanking the river and enclosing areas of marsh. This improved the river's flow, and also resulted in improved land resources on the marsh. It was nevertheless an unhealthy place in which to live; Daniel Defoe, who, in 1696, operated a tile and brick factory in the Tilbury marshes and lived in a nearby house, wrote about "the Essex ague".

In 1588 Queen Elizabeth I came ashore here to review her main army at the nearby village of West Tilbury (see Speech to the Troops at Tilbury).

In 1852 an Act of Parliament had authorised the building of the London Tilbury and Southend Railway (LTSR), with a short spur to take advantage of the ferry over the Thames; a pier nearby was constructed for the steamboat traffic. The station was originally named Tilbury Fort and opened in 1854. The station was renamed Tilbury Riverside railway station in 1936.

A few houses were built for the railway workers, but it was not until the construction of Tilbury Docks (see below) that there was any settlement worthy of a name. Whilst the docks were being built, the thousands of workers were either provided with temporary accommodation or had to commute from surrounding villages and towns. As a result of overcrowding, more permanent housing was built once the docks were completed, including tenement blocks; but these were poorly constructed, and until the formation of Tilbury District Council (see below) the town was in a poor state, as it largely remained until 1918, when government funds were available to better the situation.

The 19th century Tilbury Hotel, a largely wood-built structure by the entrance to the docks, was destroyed by incendiary bombs during raids 3-4 February 1944, with only one fatality amongst the guests.

=== Tilbury Ferry ===
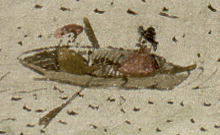
Art of the Tilbury Ferry, c. 1640

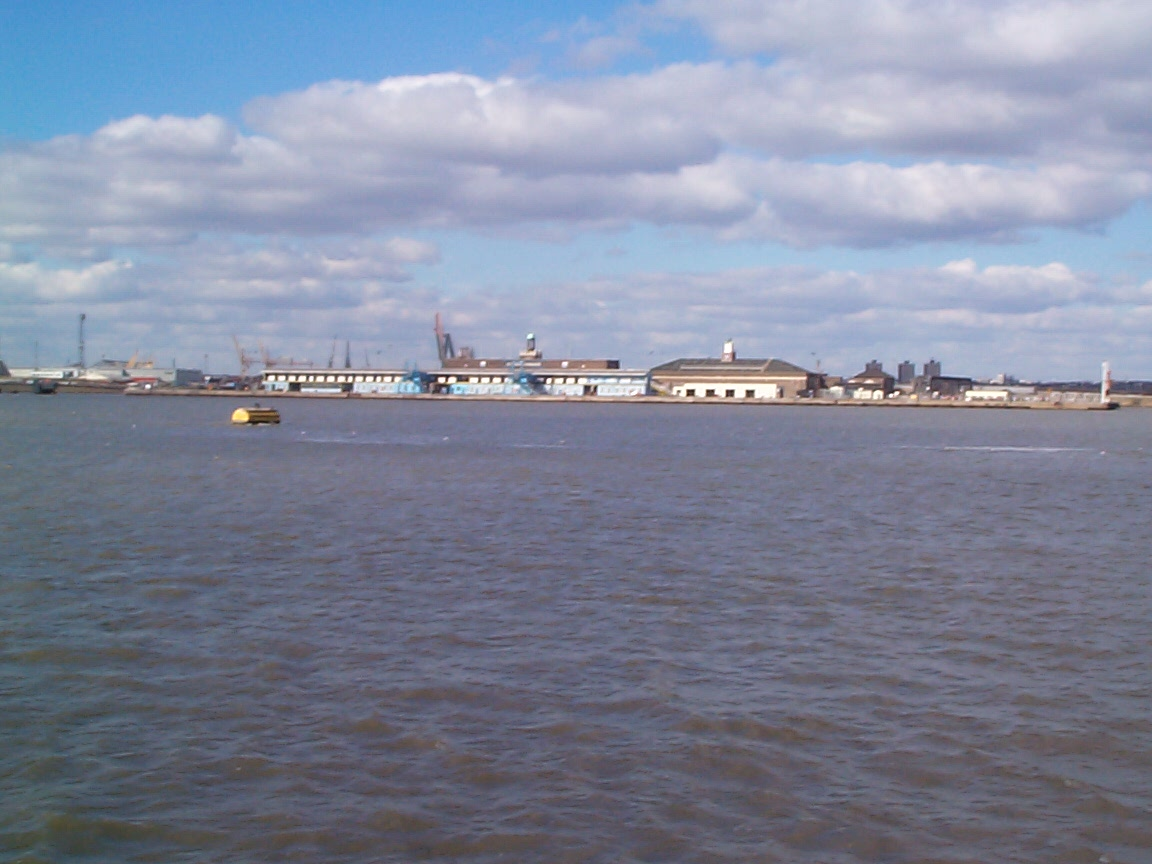
The landing stage in 2001

Tilbury–Gravesend Ferry has operated from very early times. A sketch-map of 1571 shows evidence of two jetties, the one on the north bank leading to a northward road crossing the marsh. There are also houses marked on the marsh itself, which became important for sheep grazing; and there is some evidence to suggest that the ferry was used for the cross-river transport of animals and wool. Although the 17th century drawing might suggest a boat too small for large consignments, the long-established Gravesend market encouraged such traffic, and a contemporary account suggests that one of the boats used was a hoy, a forerunner of the Thames sailing barge.

=== Tilbury Fort ===
The curve and narrowness of the river here made it a suitable place to construct forts for the defence of London against foreign invaders. The first permanent fort at Tilbury was a D-shaped blockhouse built in 1539 by Henry VIII and initially called the "Thermitage Bulwark", because it was on the site of a hermitage dissolved in 1536. The Tilbury blockhouse was designed to cross-fire with a similar structure at New Tavern, Gravesend. During the Armada campaign (1588), the fort was reinforced with earthworks and a palisade, and a boom of chains, ships' masts and cables was stretched across the Thames to Gravesend, anchored by lighters. The fort was rebuilt under Charles I and is now owned by English Heritage.

== Governance ==
There is one tier of local government covering Tilbury, at unitary authority level: Thurrock Council, based in Grays. The Tilbury built up area as defined by the Office for National Statistics straddles the two wards of Tilbury Riverside and Thurrock Park, and Tilbury St Chads.

=== Administrative history ===
Tilbury Fort straddled the ancient parishes of West Tilbury and Chadwell St Mary. The latter parish also included the marshland and banks of the Thames west of the fort where the ferry port, railway station and docks were built and the new town of Tilbury was subsequently developed from the late 19th century.

When elected parish and district councils were established in 1894, Chadwell St Mary was given a parish council and included in the Orsett Rural District. It was commented upon at the time that all the parish councillors elected at the first election lived in the nascent town of Tilbury which was growing up around Tilbury Docks at the southern end of the parish, rather than in the older village of Chadwell St Mary to the north or the rural parts of the parish. A separate ecclesiastical parish called Tilbury Docks was created in 1903, but the area remained part of the civil parish of Chadwell St Mary.

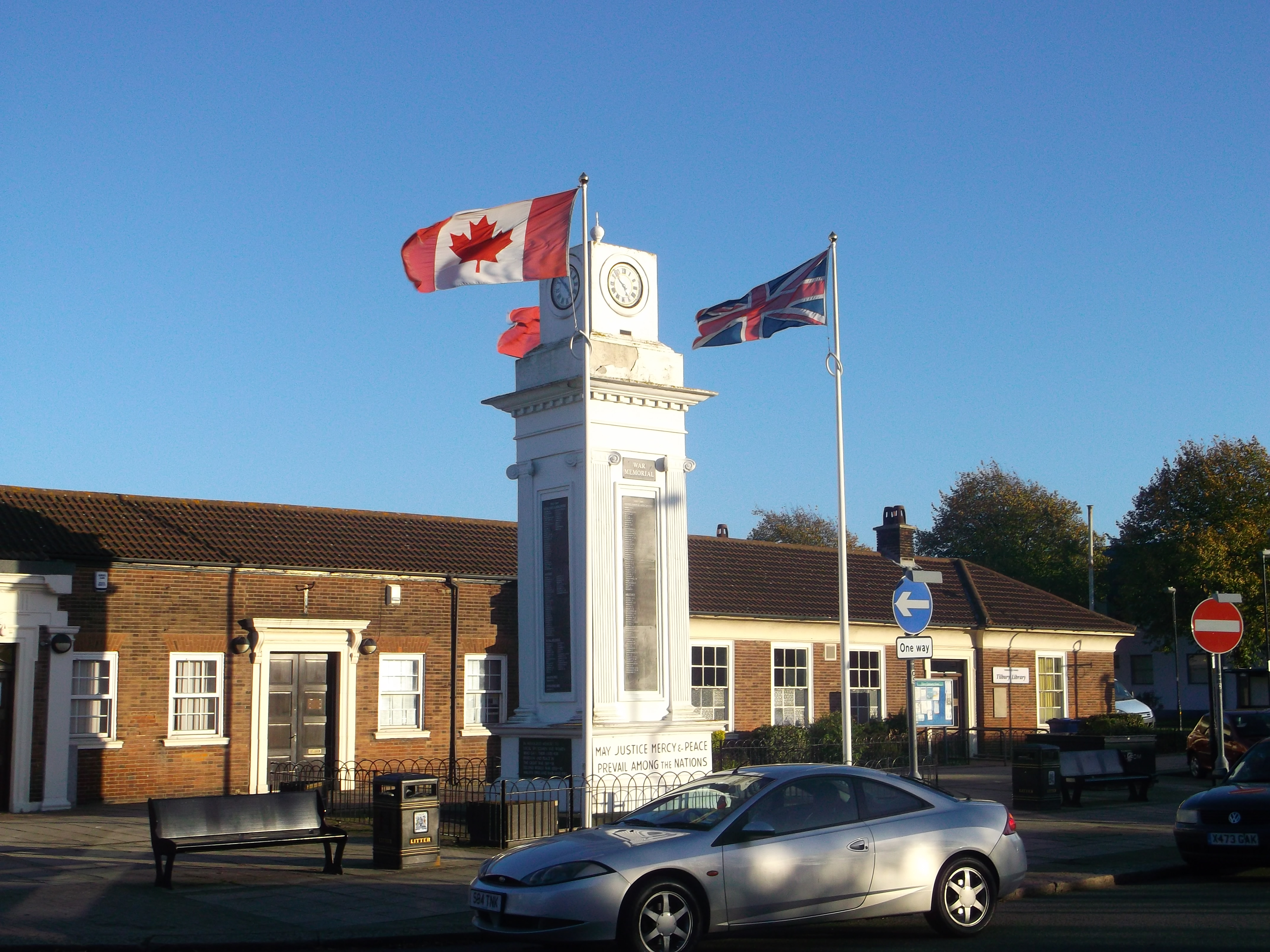
Tilbury Clock Tower War Memorial, with the council offices and library behind it

In 1912, the civil parish of Chadwell St Mary was removed from Orsett Rural District and converted into an urban district called Tilbury, with the town of Tilbury having become the largest settlement in the parish. Tilbury Urban District Council therefore replaced the Chadwell St Mary Parish Council. In the early 1930s, the urban district council laid out a new civic square as a focal point for the town centre, including a war memorial in the form of a clock tower (completed in 1934) with a public library and new council offices behind it.

In 1936, the Tilbury Urban District and the single civil parish of Chadwell St Mary that it contained were both abolished on the creation of the new Thurrock Urban District. At the 1931 census (the last before their abolition), the Chadwell St Mary civil parish and Tilbury Urban District had a population of 16,825.

Thurrock Urban District was reformed to become a non-metropolitan district with borough status called Thurrock in 1974. Thurrock Borough Council became a unitary authority in 1998, taking over county-level services in the borough which until then had been provided by Essex County Council. Thurrock remains part of the ceremonial county of Essex for the purposes of lieutenancy.

== Geography ==
Tilbury is on the north bank of the River Thames, where the river's meander has caused it to narrow to approximately 800 yards (730 metres) in width. The area to the north is one-time marshlands; to the north of that there is higher ground, where lie the villages of Chadwell St Mary, West and East Tilbury. The town lies to the north of the London-Southend railway line. Tilbury is located east of the capital of England, London.

The major landmarks are the docks, the cruise-ship landing stage, and the Tilbury Power Station. There are two churches in Tilbury: St John's (Church of England) and Our Lady Star of the Sea (Roman Catholic); there is also a Convent of Mercy. There is, in addition, a synagogue in Dock Road. The educational institutions in Tilbury include primary education, which are Lansdowne Primary School, St Mary's RC Primary School and Tilbury Manor Primary School renamed Tilbury Pioneer Academy when the school was taken over by the Gateway Learning Community, a collective of several schools in the local area. The last serve Infant and Nursery, as well as Junior children. Lying just outside the town is The Gateway Academy, the main secondary school for Tilbury, Chadwell St Mary and the eastern parts of Grays, as well as the adjoining Gateway Primary Free School. USP College (Palmers Campus) is in east Grays near Tilbury.

== Transport and industry ==
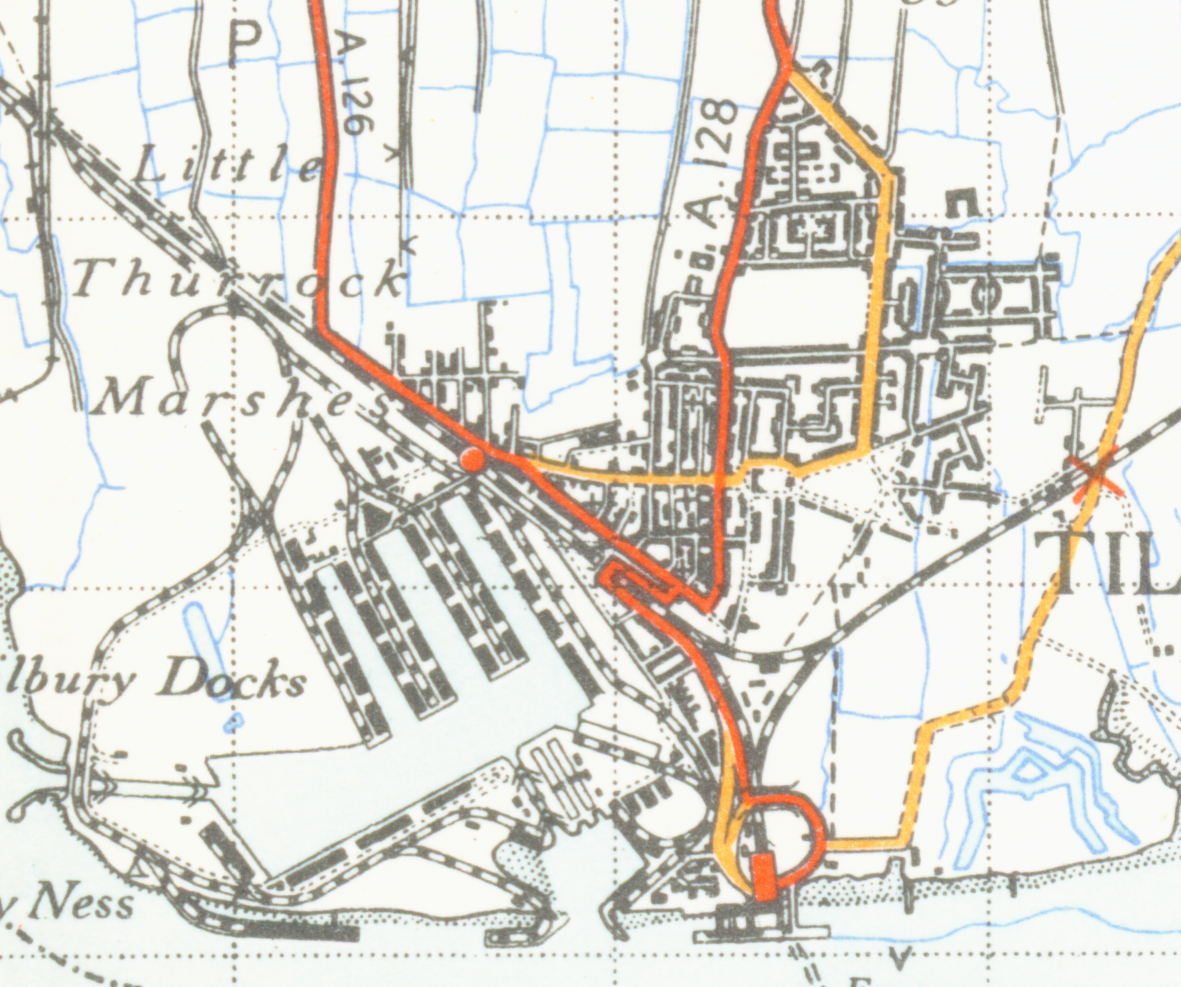
Map of the town from 1946

The Port of Tilbury handles a variety of bulk cargo, timber, cars and container traffic and remains, along with Southampton and Felixstowe, one of Britain's three major container ports. It is the main UK port for importing paper, including newsprint. The one-time passenger landing stage was reopened by the Port of Tilbury group as the London Cruise Terminal, though it is no longer served by the railway.

Until the introduction of standardised containers, the majority of the town's inhabitants were employed in the docks. The resulting loss of jobs has never been made up. So Tilbury today has high unemployment, and education and employment prospects are widely perceived as poor.

Thurrock Council, together with Kent County Council, subsidised the ferry between Tilbury and Gravesend, which was operated by Lower Thames & Medway Passenger Boat Company and then by Jetstream Tours. It ceased to operate from 2024.

Tilbury Town railway station is on the c2c (London, Tilbury and Southend line), providing services to London Fenchurch Street and Southend. Tilbury Riverside railway station was closed on 29 November 1992, although the railway still serves the nearby container depot.

Local buses are operated by Ensignbus.

National Cycle Route 13 from London to Norfolk passes through the town.

== People and culture ==
The Tilbury Band, dating from 1919, was among the leading brass bands in the UK.

Notable people who have had some connection with Tilbury include: football players, John Evans (1929–2004), and Tom Scannell (1925–1994); Noel Betowski, artist, was born there in 1952; Thomas Horrocks Openshaw (1856–1929), a consultant surgeon at Tilbury Hospital; and actor Adewale Akinnuoye-Agbaje whose being raised there by foster parents is documented in the movie Farming.

In the 2014 BBC series The Honourable Woman, the title character Nessa Stein is made Baroness of Tilbury in the first episode.

Tilbury and its environs have been used in some television episodes. Tilbury Fort was used as a location for Sharpe's Regiment, starring Sean Bean.

== Healthcare ==
Until 1896 Tilbury had no hospital. In 1894 the Philanthropist John Passmore Edwards, M.P. agreed to fund a new hospital which was named the Passmore Edwards District Cottage Hospital. In 1969 Orsett Hospital took over healthcare provision in the area.

== Media ==
Local radio station Gateway 97.8, is a community based radio station.

The Thurrock Gazette is the town's local weekly newspaper.

== Sport and leisure ==
Tilbury has a non-League football club Tilbury F.C. who play at Chadfields. Chadfields had previously been a greyhound racing track. The racing was independent (not affiliated to the sports governing body the National Greyhound Racing Club) and was known as a flapping track, which was the nickname given to independent tracks. The racing is believed to have been operational in the 1930s and lasted until 1947, when a betting licence had been granted.

A later venue called the Tilbury Stadium on land at the end of Dunlop Road also hosted greyhounds between 1964 and 1967.
