= Henry James (British Army officer) =

British army officer, surveyor, engineer and inventor

Lieutenant-General Sir Henry James FRS MRIA FGS
- Born: 8 June 1803; Rose in Vale, Mithian, Cornwall; Truro, Cornwall
- Died: 14 June 1877 (aged 74); Southampton, England
- Spouse: Anne Emma Watson (m. 1845)
- Relatives: Henry Spencer Palmer (nephew)
- Military career
- Allegiance: United Kingdom
- Branch: Board of Ordnance; British Army
- Service years: 1826–1877
- Rank: Brevet Lieutenant-General
- Service number: 604
- Unit: Corps of Royal Engineers
- Commands: Director of Ordnance Survey, 1854–75; Director of the Topographical and Statistical Department of the War Office, 1857–70
- Awards: Knight Bachelor, 1860

Lieutenant-General Sir Henry James FRS MRIA FGS (1803 – 1877) was a Royal Engineers officer who served as the director-general of the Ordnance Survey, the British Government mapping agency, from 1854 to 1875. Sir Henry was described by the agency itself as "perhaps Ordnance Survey's most eccentric and egotistical Director General". Sir Henry spent most of his life working for the Ordnance Survey and after becoming its head he introduced the new science of photography. He also would later claim to be the inventor of the process known as Photozincography or Zinco. Sir Henry also played a part in the resolving of the battle of the scales.

== Career and early life ==
Born in 1803 at Rose in Vale, Mithian, Cornwall, he was the fifth son of John James of Truro and Jane, daughter of John Hoskers. He attended a grammar school in Exeter and the Royal Military Academy, Woolwich, from which he was commissioned as a second lieutenant in the Royal Engineers on 22 September 1826. He was promoted to captain in 1846 and then to Colonel in 1857.

In 1827 he joined the Ordnance Survey and spent the majority of his career working for it, mainly in Ireland, though after a brief stint at the Admiralty, he eventually climbed through the ranks to take charge of the Edinburgh Office of the Ordnance Survey in 1850. His appointment to head of the Ordnance Survey was controversial, as his father-in-law, Major General Edward Watson, RE, aided him above two more obvious candidates.

He married Anne Emma Watson, daughter of Major General Edward Watson, Royal Engineers, at St John's, Paddington, London, by The Rev. Capel Molyneux, on 13 February 1845.

=== Director-General ===
In 1854, at the age of 51, he became Superintendent of the Ordnance Survey, taking over from Lieutenant Colonel Lewis Hall. He was far more experienced than his predecessor having worked most of his life for the Survey. Upon assuming the directorship, Sir Henry became involved in the battle of the scales. While the Ordnance Survey had surveyed a large part of the country, the scale at which the maps should be made and what was the most useful had yet to be decided. Sir Henry was a firm believer in the 1:2500 scale, and he used his position to effect this change despite the less than full approval of his superiors.

James created a photography department to the Ordnance Survey in 1855 as a means of reducing the scale of maps. This included a purpose-built photographic building, designed by James, which allowed two photographers to work at the same time. He claimed to have invented photozincography, a photographic method of producing printing plates. In fact, the process had been developed by two of his staff. However James was the driving force behind using the process to create and publish a facsimile of the Domesday Book in the 1860s. Sir Henry has been called, by T. Owen, one of the greatest image builders the Ordnance Survey ever had, because Sir Henry made all the advances he and his department made freely available. This was taken up by many foreign governments who were suitably impressed, the Queen of Spain making him a member of the Order of Isabella the Catholic in 1863; which he added to his knighthood of 1860 for services to science.

Sir Henry James continued using his photozincographic process to preserve historic manuscripts. He went on to publish a whole series of English historical documents, the process of which continued on after his death. Similarly he ordered the Ordnance Survey of Jerusalem which was commissioned to help improve the water supply to the city. A copy of this map still survives at the National Archives.

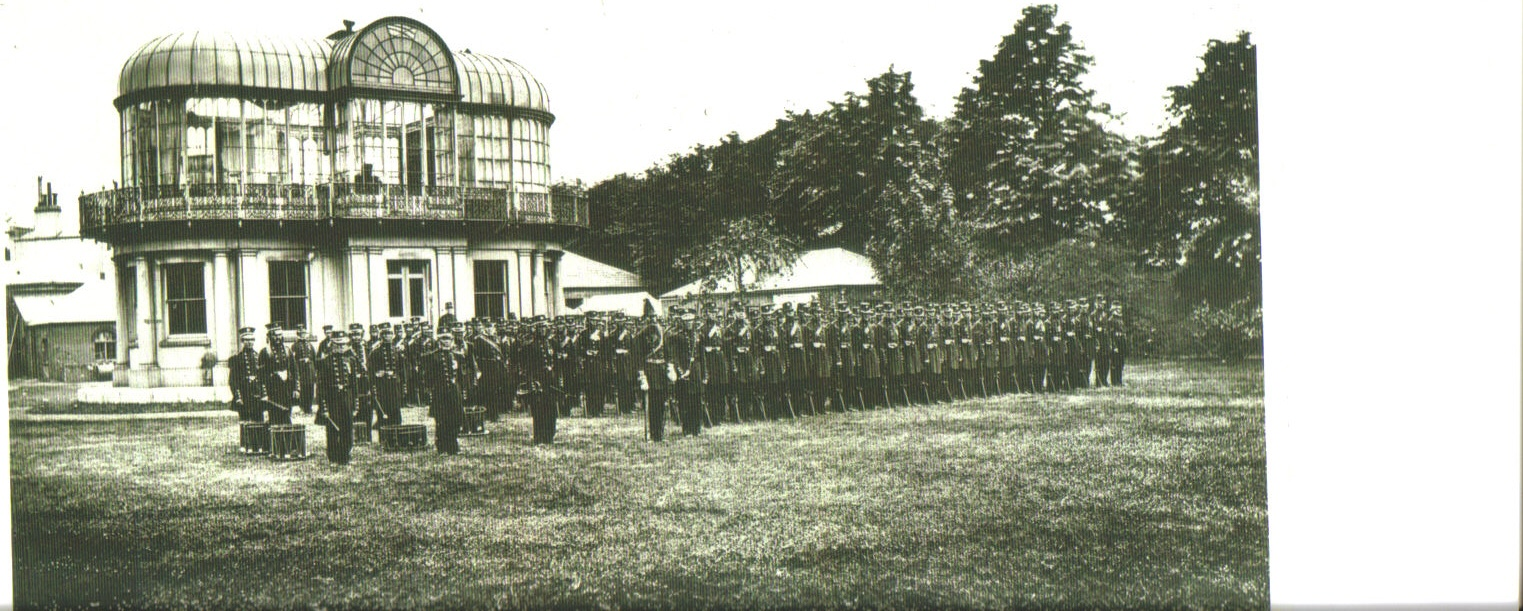
Photograph of the photography building and Henry James

== Retirement ==
Due to failing health Sir Henry retired in 1875 at the age of 72, having been Director General of the Ordnance Survey for 21 years. His retirement was welcomed by his colleagues and soon after his departure a thinly veiled attack on his running of the survey was released in the Hampshire Independent in 1875. Sir Henry James died on 14 June 1877, at the age of 75, at his home in Southampton. Despite his death, his mark remained on the Ordnance Survey—a plaque with his name and the date being attached to every building at the Ordnance Survey offices that was built during his tenure.

== Publications ==
- James, Henry (1860). Photo-zincography (2nd ed.). Southampton: Forbes and Bennett.
