= Barkla Shop =

Hamlet in Cornwall, England

Coordinates: 50.311°N 05.177°W

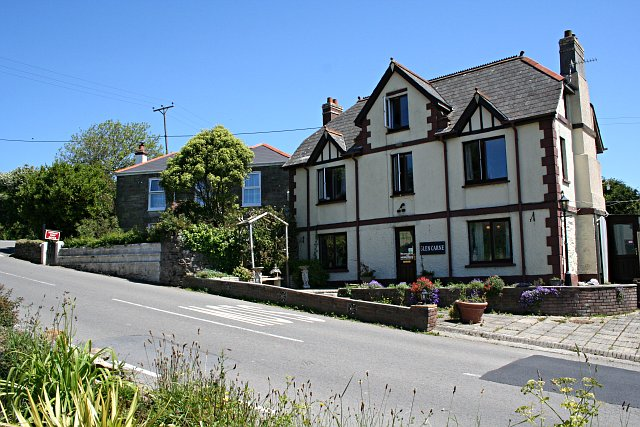
- Barkla Shop

- Location within Cornwall
- OS grid reference: SW738505
- Civil parish: Perranzabuloe
- Shire county: Cornwall
- Region: South West
- Country: England
- Sovereign state: United Kingdom
- Post town: St Agnes
- Postcode district: TR5
- Police: Devon and Cornwall
- Fire: Cornwall
- Ambulance: South Western
- UK Parliament: Truro and Falmouth

Barkla Shop is a small hamlet in mid Cornwall, England, United Kingdom half-a-mile east of St Agnes. It is in the civil parish of Perranzabuloe.

Barkla Shop, located on the road between Perranporth and St Agnes, is named after a blacksmith's shop. When the railway was built rock was brought from the Wheal Liberty quarries by horses, and the blacksmith's shop was important to properly maintain the horses. There was also a carpenter's shop. Both shops are no longer there.

The Mithian post office is located in Barkla.

The Glen Carne Housing and Support organisation has a location in Barkla Shop, for long term housing while homeless men gain training and education, such as in Information Technology or horticulture.

== Gallery ==
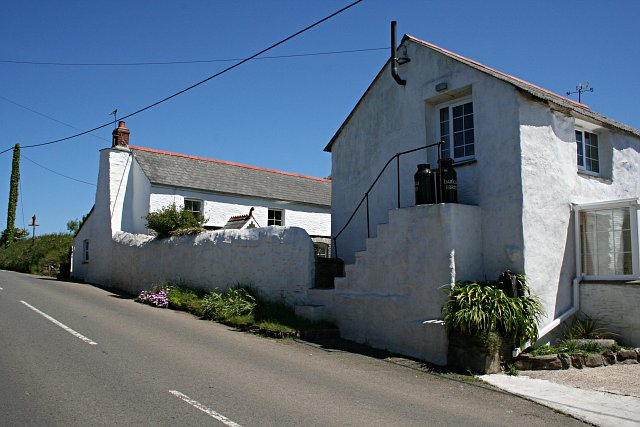
Barkla Farm

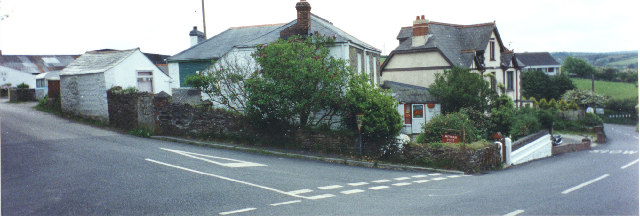
Mithian Post Office, Barkla Shop, St Agnes

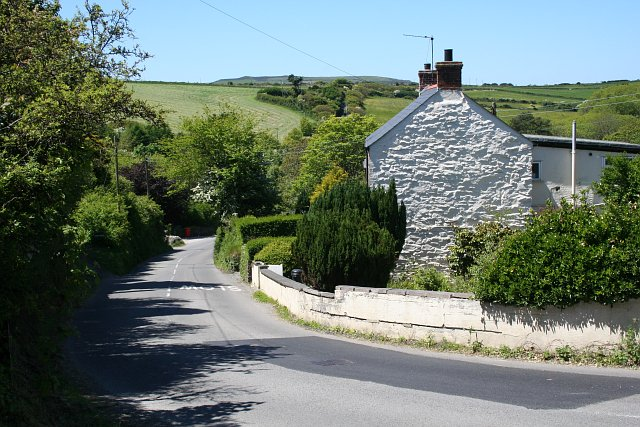
Across Trevellas Valley at Barkla Shop

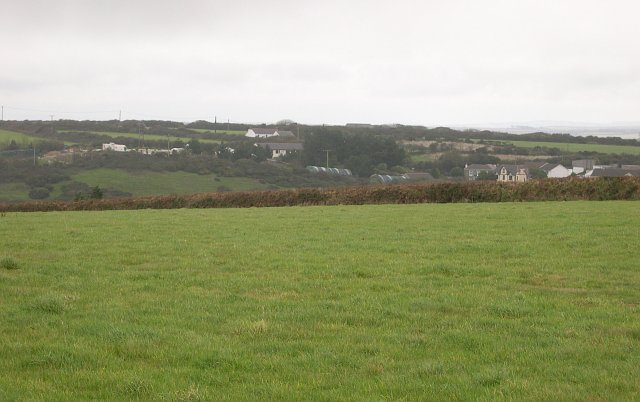
Across the valley to Barkla Shop from a spot near Ropewalk Farm looks east across the valley. The village of Mithian lies over the far hillside.

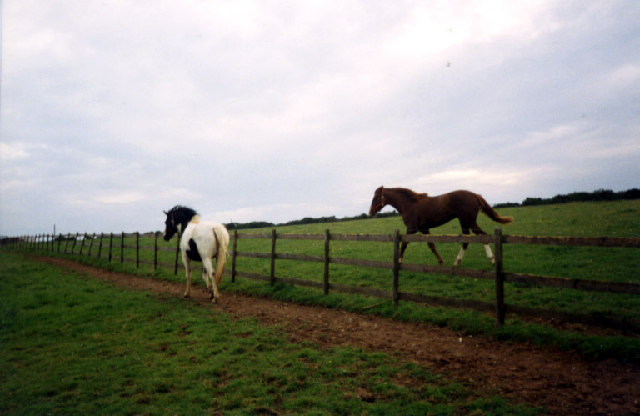
Guard horse near Barkla Shop
