= William White (architect, born 1825) =

English architect (1825–1900)

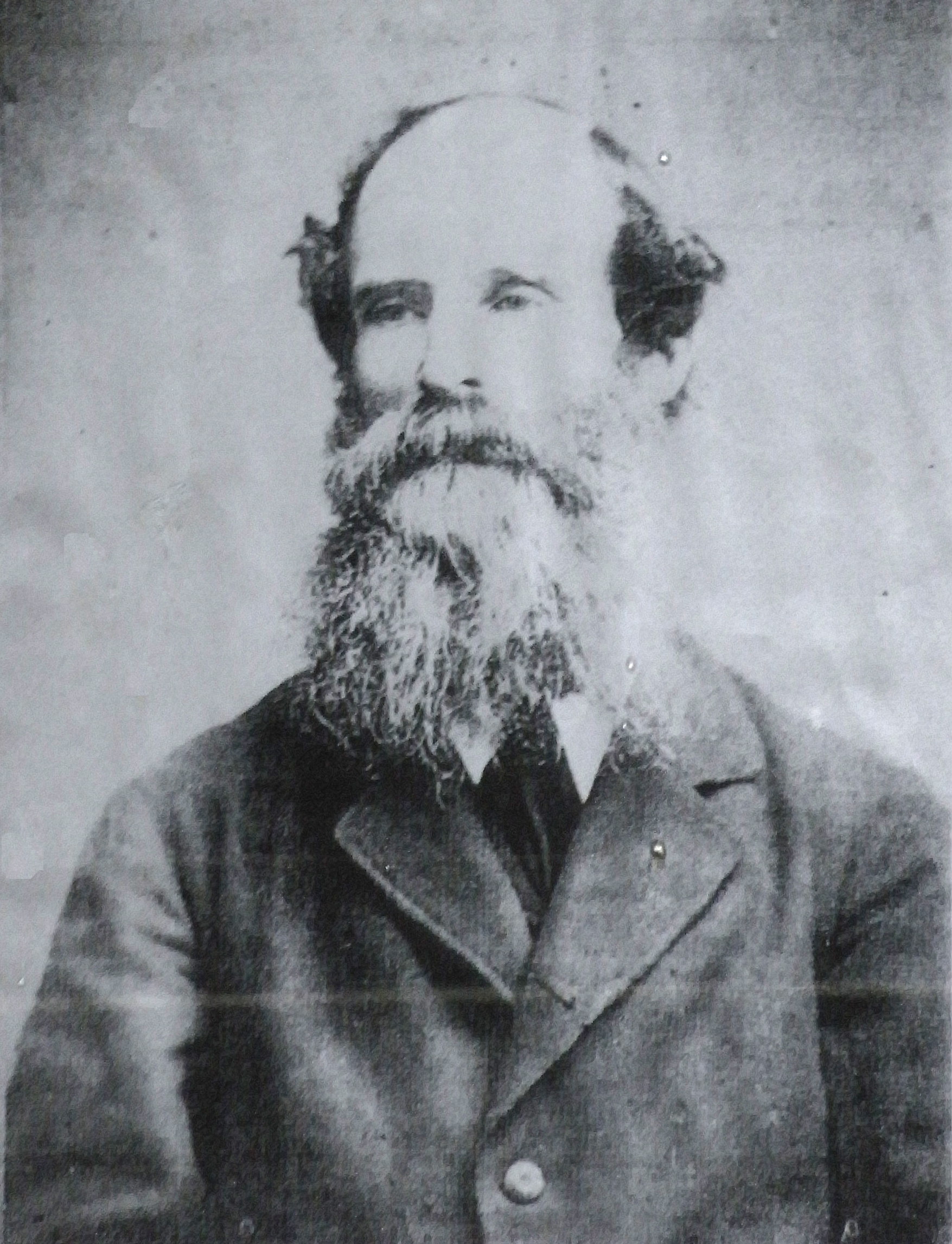
White, in about 1900

William White, FSA (15 May 1825 – 1900) was an English architect, noted for his part in 19th-century Gothic Revival architecture and church restorations.

William White was born in Blakesley, Northamptonshire, England, on 15 May 1825. He was the son of a clergyman, and great nephew of the writer and naturalist Gilbert White of Selborne. After a five-year apprenticeship in Leamington Spa he moved to London as an improver in George Gilbert Scott's practice, where he remained for two years before setting up his own practice in Truro, Cornwall in 1847. In 1851 he returned to London and worked out of Wimpole Street. His style was close to that of William Butterfield and he built many churches.

== Works ==
=== Cornwall ===
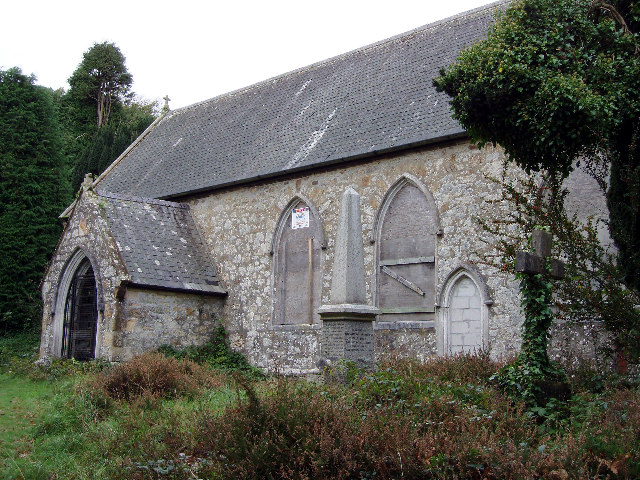
St Michael's parish church, Baldhu

- St Michael's parish church, Baldhu (new build), 1848
- Maryfield House, Antony, near Torpoint (school, house and vicarage), 1848
- Bank and Solicitors Offices, Truro (new commercial premises for the Cornish Bank and solicitors offices), 1849. Now Charlotte's Tea House and Pizza Express.
- St Gerrent, Gerrans (rebuild apart from tower and spire), 1850
- St Felicitas and St Piala's Church, Phillack, 1856–1857
- St Philip and St James parish church, Antony, near Torpoint
- House at Lower Town, Colan, Mountjoy, circa 1875
- St Peter's parish church, Mithian, near St Agnes, 1861
- Bank House, at St Columb Major, circa 1857
- House at Denzell, near St Columb Major
- The Old Rectory, St Columb Major
- Penmellyn House, St Columb Major
- Rosemellyn House, St Columb Major, 1871
- St Hilary's parish church, rebuilt on the old foundations in 1855
- Rectory for Canon Reginald Hobhouse at St Ive, 1852–54
- St Moren parish church, Lamorran, 1845, restoration
- St Petroc's parish church, Little Petherick, 1858
- St Peter's parish church, Mithian, 1861
- Trewan Hall, alterations and additions, 1870

=== Devon ===
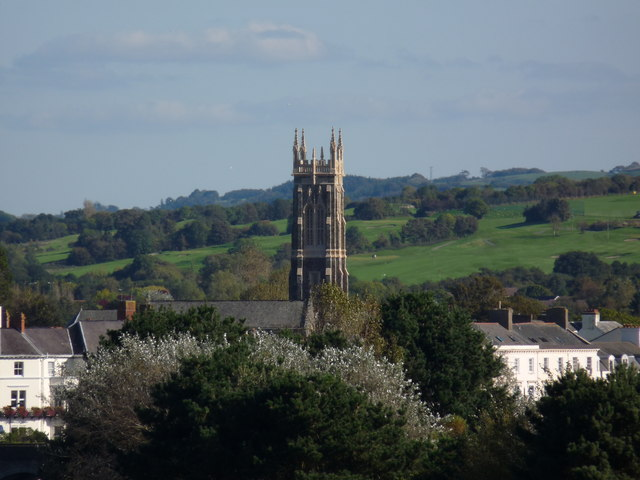
Holy Trinity parish church, Barnstaple

- Bishop's Court, Sowton. This former bishop's palace was remodelled in the 1860s and is considered by English Heritage to be one of White's most important domestic buildings; he carefully designed the fittings and much of the furniture, with exceptional attention to detail, specifically for the house.
- St Michael's parish church, Clyst Honiton
- St Nicholas & St Giles parish church, Sidmouth
- Holy Trinity parish church, Barnstaple, 1867
- St Mary's parish church, Upton Pyne, alterations 1874–75
- St Michael and All Angels parish church, Cadbury, Devon, restoration in 1857
- St John the Baptist parish church, Instow, restored 1872–73
- St Peter's parish church, Shirwell, heavily restored 1880s
- Holy Trinity parish church, West Down, restored 1874
- Dartington Hall, South Hams, remodelled and extended again in about 1860
- Winscott House, Peters Marland, 1865, for John Curzon Moore-Stevens, Esq.
- St Peter's parish church, Peters Marland, 1865, financed by John Curzon Moore-Stevens, Esq., of Winscott House. Rebuilding of nave and chancel, ancient tower unaltered.

=== Essex ===
- St Giles parish church, Great Maplestead
- St Laurence and All Saints Church, Eastwood, restoration, 1873–75

=== Hampshire ===
- Christ Church, Freemantle, Southampton, consecrated 1865
- Christ Church, Hatherden, 1857
- St Mark's parish church, Woolston, consecrated 17 November 1863
- St Mary's parish church, Selborne, restoration, 1856
- St Michael and All Angels church, Lyndhurst, between 1890 and 1892

=== Lincolnshire ===
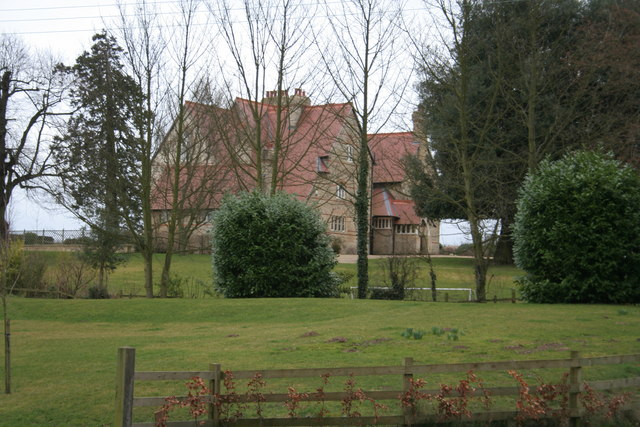
Heydour Old Vicarage

- Heydour. The Old Vicarage, 1857. Nikolaus Pevsner: "Picturesque and asymmetrical, varied roof lines, tile hung gables and pointed arches picked out in red brick". The vicarage is a precursor to the Queen Anne style of architecture.

=== London ===
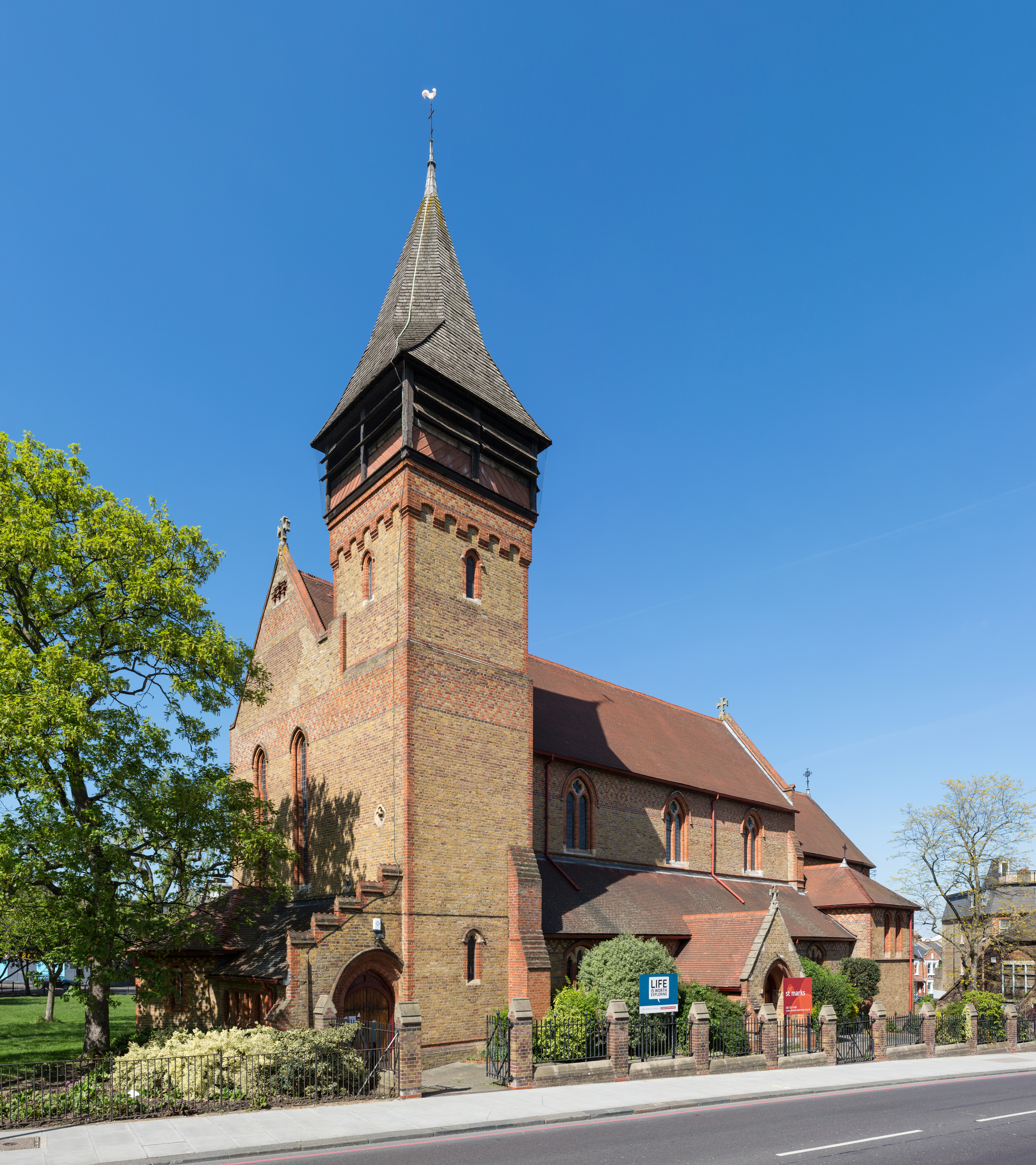
St Mark's, Battersea Rise

- St Mark's parish church, Battersea Rise, 1872–74
- St Saviour's parish church, Aberdeen Park, Islington, 1865–66
- All Saints parish church, Kensington
- Forest School Chapel, College Place, Waltham Forest, built 1857 and enlarged 1875
- St Michael's parish church, Wandsworth Common, 1881
- St Dionis Vicarage, 18 Parsons Green, Fulham, 1898–99

=== Oxfordshire ===
- All Saints parish church, Mollington, restoration, 1856
- St James parish church, Claydon, restoration, 1860
- St Lawrence's parsonage, Milcombe, 1861–62
- All Saints parish church, Great Bourton, almost completely rebuilt, 1863
- Holy Trinity Vicarage, Finstock, 1864
- St Giles parish church, Wigginton, restoration of chancel and south aisle, 1870
- Belfried gate tower for All Saints parish church, Great Bourton, 1882

=== Surrey ===
- St John the Divine parish church, Felbridge, 1865
- St John's Vicarage, Felbridge

=== Sussex ===
- St Mary the Virgin parish church, Littlehampton, West Sussex, new chancel and restoration, 1899
- St Peter and St Paul parish church, West Wittering, West Sussex

=== Wiltshire ===
- St Michael's church, Axford, 1856
- School and master's house, Chute, 1857–8 (now village hall)
- St Michael the Archangel, Brixton Deverill, refenestrated and chancel extended, 1862
- Church of the Holy Saviour, Westbury Leigh: nave and chancel 1876–7; south aisle, 1888–9; tower, 1899

=== Other counties of England ===
- Holy Innocents parish church, Adisham, Kent, restoration, 1869
- Quy Hall, Stow-cum-Quy, Cambridgeshire, rebuilding, 1869–71
- St. James and St. John parish church, Derwent, Derbyshire
- Holy Trinity parish church, Elvington, York, East Riding of Yorkshire, 1876–77
- Holy Cross & St. Mary's parish church, Quainton, Buckinghamshire, 1877
- St Leonard's parish church, Sandridge, Hertfordshire, comprehensive restoration, 1886–87
- Stained glass in Holy Trinity, Touchen End, Berkshire
- The Old Vicarage, Irton, Holmrook, Cumbria, 1864

=== Ireland ===
- Humewood Castle, Wicklow Mountains, Ireland (Note: Professor Mark Girouard acknowledges Humewood as "the finest and most important 19th century castellated mansion in Ireland")

=== South Africa ===
- St, Batholomew's Church, Grahamstown
- Armstrong House and Espin House, St. Andrew's College, Grahamstown

=== Madagascar ===
- St. Lawrence Anglican Cathedral Ambohimanoro, Antananarivo

== White's contemporaries in the Gothic Revival ==
- James Brooks
- Richard Cromwell Carpenter
- John Loughborough Pearson
- Benjamin Mountfort
- James Piers St Aubyn
- George Edmund Street
- Henry Woodyer

== Notes and references ==
- Baggs, A.P.; Kent, G.H.R.; Purdy, J.D. (1976). "Elvington". In Allison, K.J. (ed.). A History of the County of York East Riding: Volume 3: Ouse and Derwent wapentake, and part of Harthill wapentake. pp. 12–17.
- Demissie, Fassil (2012). Colonial Architecture and Urbanism in Africa: Intertwined and Contested Histories. Ashgate. ISBN 978-0-7546-7512-9.
- Elleray, D. Robert (2004). Sussex Places of Worship. Worthing: Optimus Books. p. 39. ISBN 0-9533132-7-1.
- Girouard, Mark (1979). The Victorian Country House. Yale University Press. ISBN 0-300-03472-5.
- Hunter, Gill (2010). William White: Pioneer Victorian Architect. Spire. ISBN 978-1-904965-26-8.
- Lauder, Rosemary (2005). Vanished Houses of North Devon. Tiverton: Winscott House. ISBN 978-0-9528645-2-3.
- Nairn, Ian; Pevsner, Nikolaus; Cherry, Bridget (revision) (1971) [1962]. Surrey. The Buildings of England (2nd ed.). Harmondsworth: Penguin Books. p. 244. SBN 14-071021-3.
- Poland, Marguerite (2018). The St Andrew's College Chapel - A history: 1855 - 2018. Grahamstown: St Andrew's College.
- Sherwood, Jennifer; Pevsner, Nikolaus (1974). Oxfordshire. The Buildings of England. Harmondsworth: Penguin Books. ISBN 0-14-071045-0.
