= St Dionis, Parsons Green =

Church in Fulham, London, England

Coordinates: 51.4735°N 0.2010°W

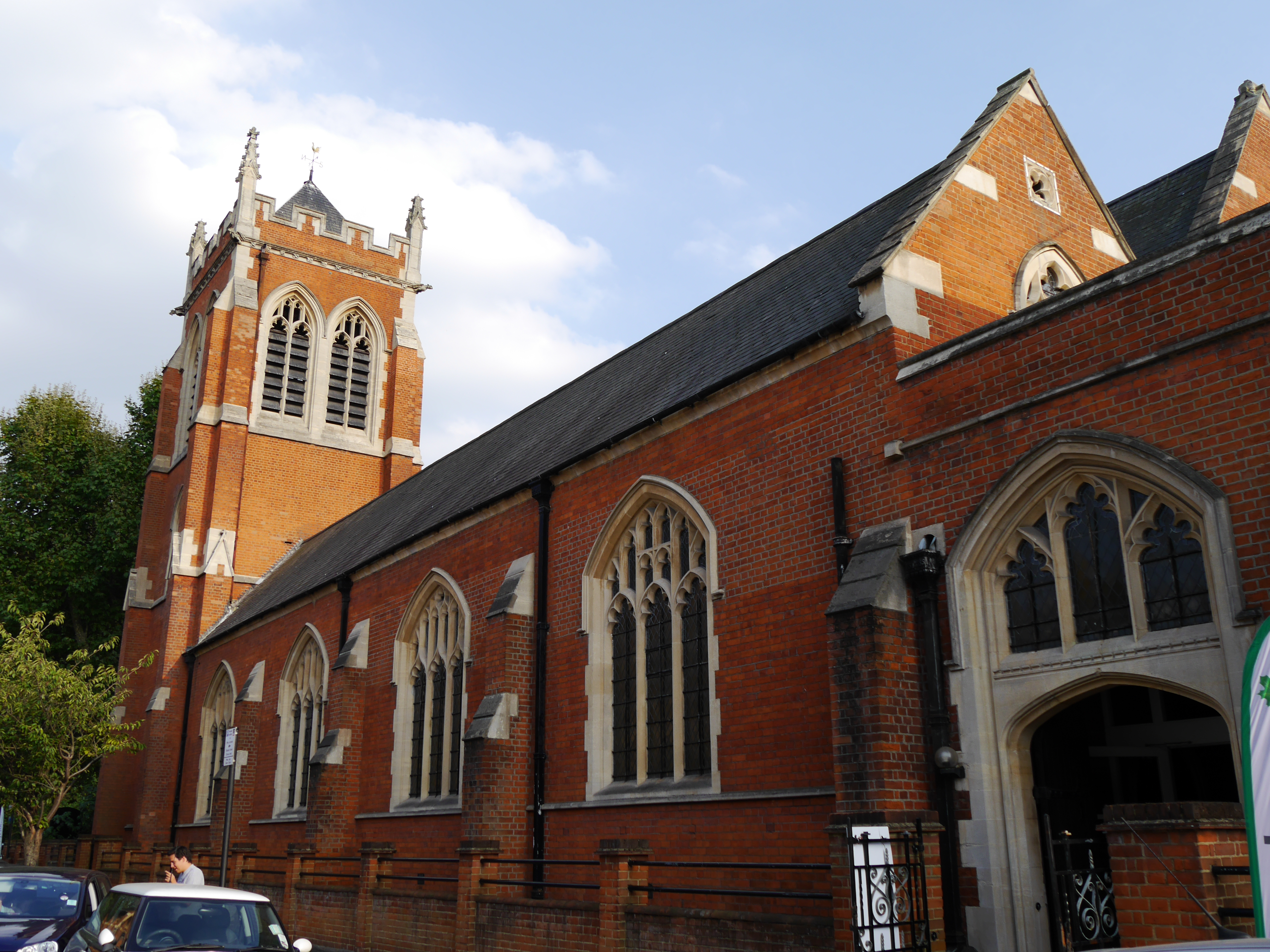
St. Dionis church

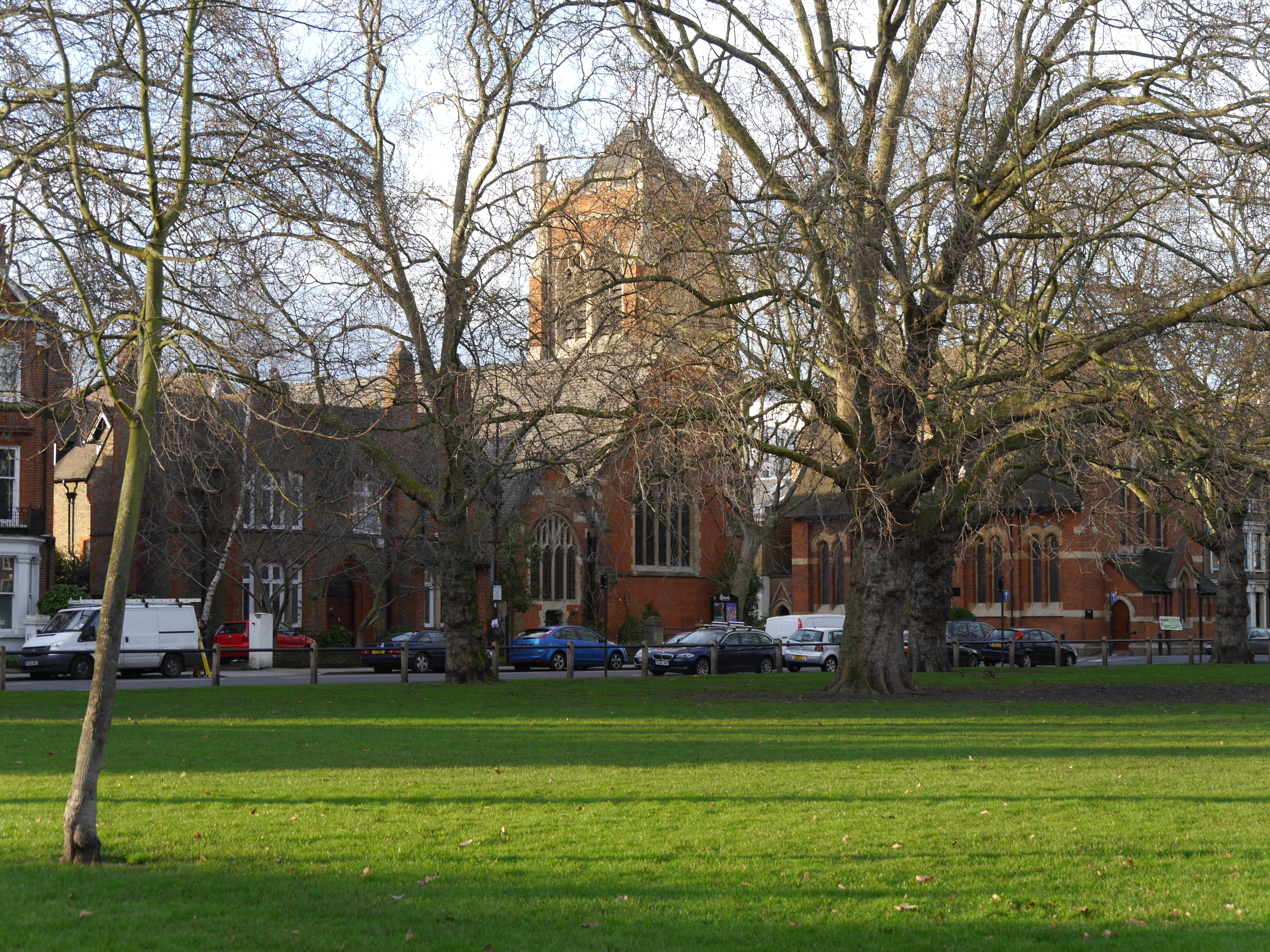
St. Dionis: Vicarage, Church and Mission Hall (left to right)

St. Dionis, Parsons Green, is a Grade II listed Anglican church at Parsons Green, Fulham, London.

== History ==
The church was built in 1886 in the Perpendicular Gothic style to a design by the architect Ewan Christian. It replaced the 1876 building to the right, St Dionis Mission Hall, which became its Mission Hall.

It was named after St Dionis Backchurch, a parish church in the City of London of medieval origin, which was rebuilt after the Great Fire of London to the designs of Christopher Wren. After being declared unsafe, it was demolished in 1878. St. Dionis, Parsons Green, was paid for with the proceeds of the sale of the site, and the font and pulpit of the City church survive there. The name "Dionis" is, in fact, a corruption of Denis, the name of the traditional apostle of France who was beheaded while trying to convert the Parisians in the 3rd century. The church, therefore, is dedicated to Saint Denis.

St Dionis Vicarage, built 1898–99, is to the left.
