= Rose in Vale Country House Hotel =

Building in Mithian, Cornwall, England

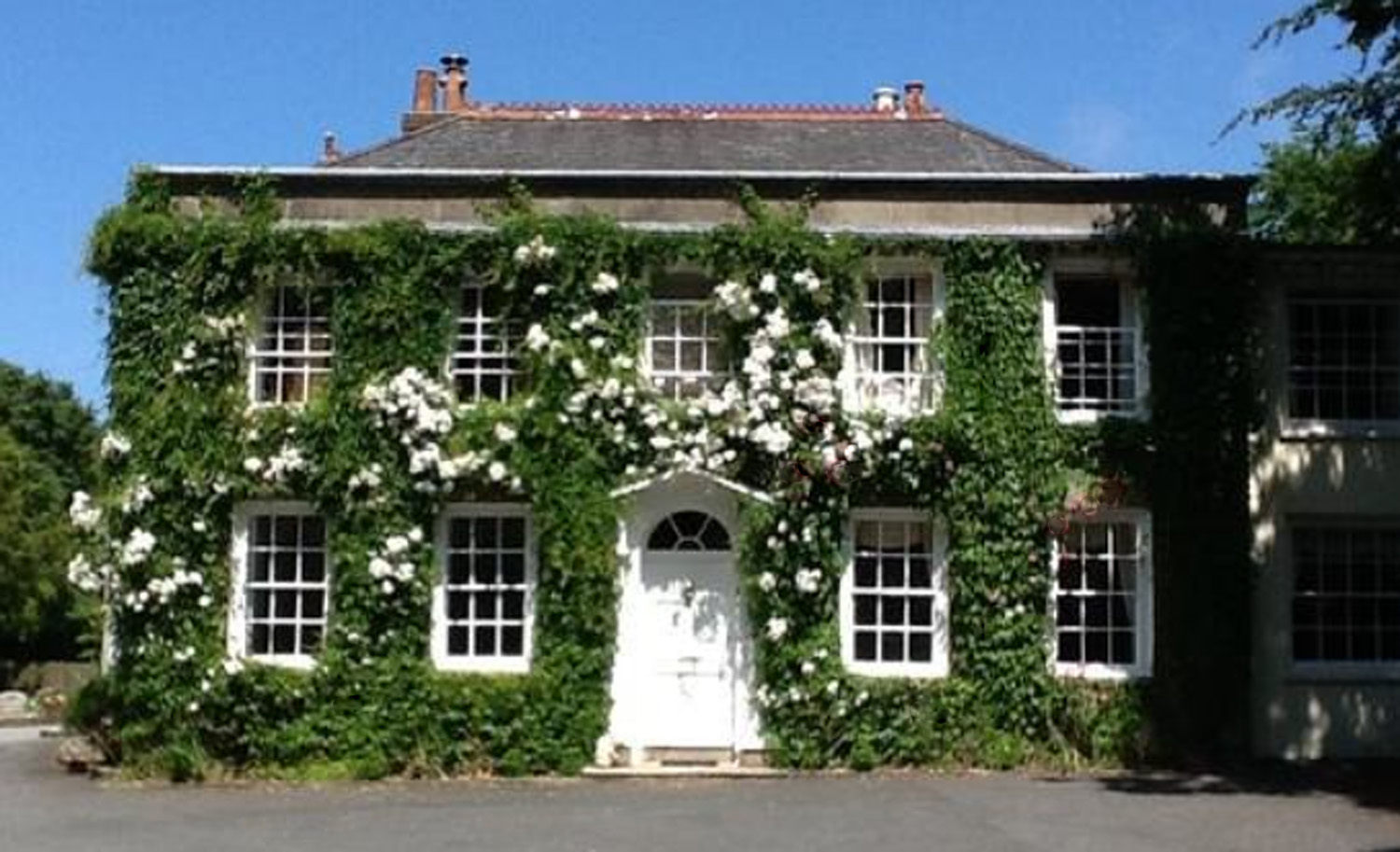

- Location within Cornwall
- 50.3130°N 5.1662°W
- Location: Mithian, Perranzabuloe, Cornwall, England

Listed Building – Grade II*
- Official name: Rose in Vale Country Club
- Designated: 30 May 1967
- Reference no.: 1141527

Rose in Vale Country House Hotel, in Mithian, Cornwall, England, UK, is a building of historical significance and is Grade II* listed on the English Heritage Register. It was originally a 17th-century Cornish longhouse that consisted of two cottages. In 1761, Mr Thomas Nankivell bought the property and added the Georgian frontage. It was the home of several prominent people over the next two hundred years. Today, it is a hotel that provides accommodation and restaurant facilities and caters to special events, particularly weddings.

== Early residents ==
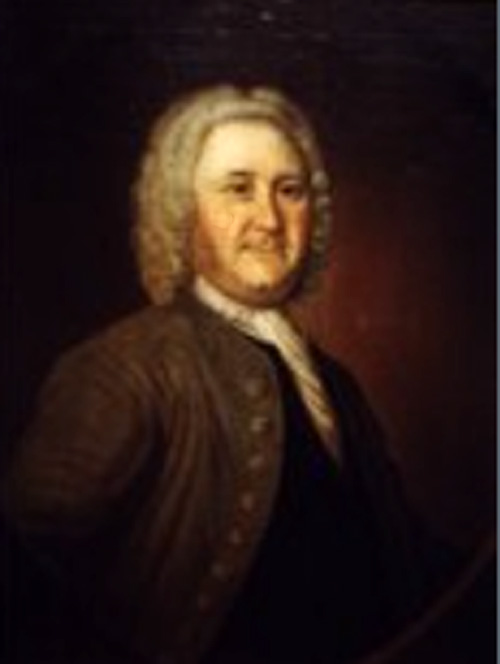
Thomas Nankivell

Thomas Nankivell (1707–1777), who made substantial additions to the house in 1761, was a wealthy landowner. His Will revealed that he owned numerous properties. He was born in 1707 in St Agnes. His father was Benjamin Nankivell (1681-1759). He also owned many properties some of which Thomas inherited when his father died in 1759. In 1738, Thomas married Mary Giddy (1711–1809), the daughter of John Giddy of Kea. The couple had ten children.

The family befriended the famous artist John Opie when he was young and encouraged him in his work. Out of gratitude for their assistance, Opie painted Joyce Townsend, who was one of their daughters. She was a local beauty who was said to possess "great sweetness and animation".

Elizabeth, who was another of Thomas’s daughters, married in 1763 John James. Their son John James (1770–1719), a solicitor in Truro, inherited Rose in Vale after his grandfather Thomas Nankivell died in 1777. John's son, the famous surveyor Sir Henry James, RE, was born at Rose in Vale in 1803.

In 1804, John advertised the sale of all of his property. Rose in Vale was included in the advertisement and was described as a "dwelling house consisting of a drawing room, a dining room and parlour. Also, there is a hall, kitchen, laundry, and pantry with a back kitchen, suitable offices, and eight bedrooms." At this time, Rev James Bennetto rented the house, bought the property, and lived there until he died in 1818.

The Rev James Bennetto (1752–1818) was born in 1752 in St Stephen-in-Brannel, Cornwall. He was educated at the University of Oxford, and in 1793, was appointed as Vicar of Perranzabuloe and St Agnes. In 1795, he married Elizabeth Southerd (1770–1865). The couple had six children. In 1818, James died, and the house was advertised for sale.

Captain John Oates (1768–1855) became the owner soon after this. He was living there by 1828, as his father’s burial notice records that he died aged 90 at Rose in Vale in 1828. Captain Oates owned the Great Wheal Leisure Copper Mine at Perranporth. He was also involved in other mines. In the early 1830s Captain Oates and his co-adventurers sank a shaft at Wheal Leisure Mine and "upon the shaft was put a steam engine and water wheel to drain the lodes."

In 1796, he married Joan Cowlin (sometimes called Cowling). The couple had no children. John became very wealthy and purchased many properties in the area. Because of his wealth, he generously gave the poor numerous funds to assist them. Joan died in 1850 and he died in 1855. As he had no children, he left Rose in Vale to his wife’s nephew, Richard Cowling.

== Later residents ==
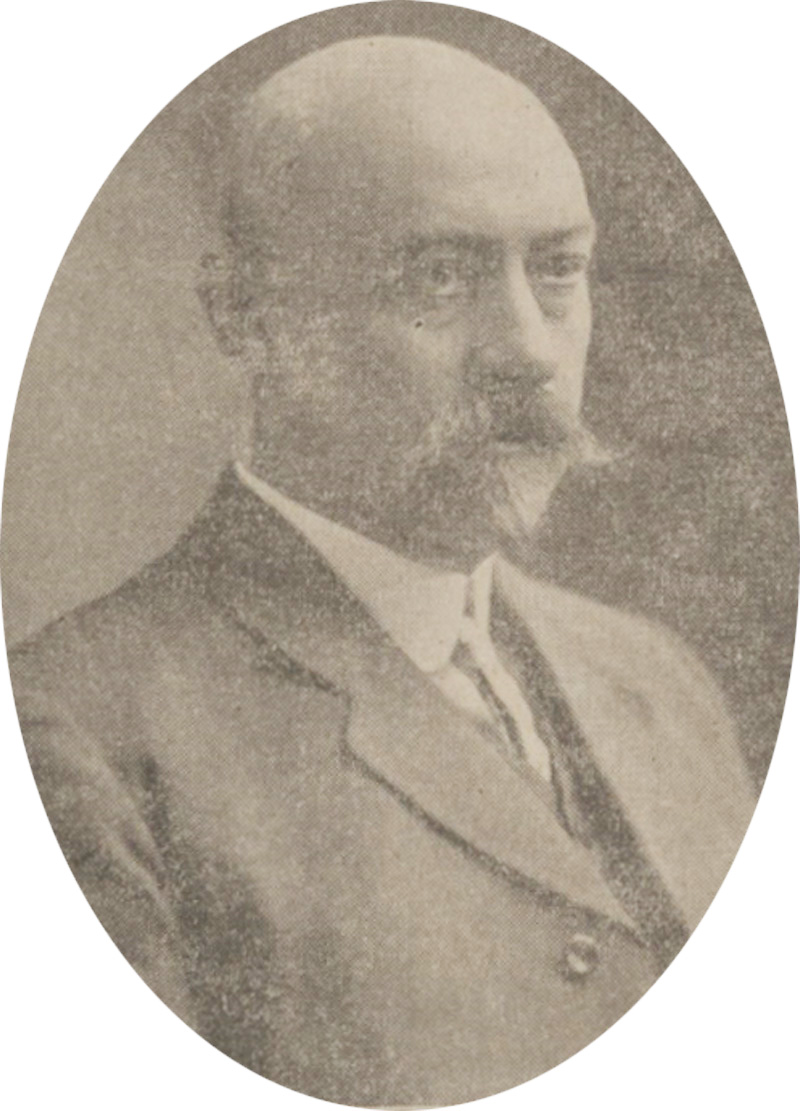
Captain John Whitford

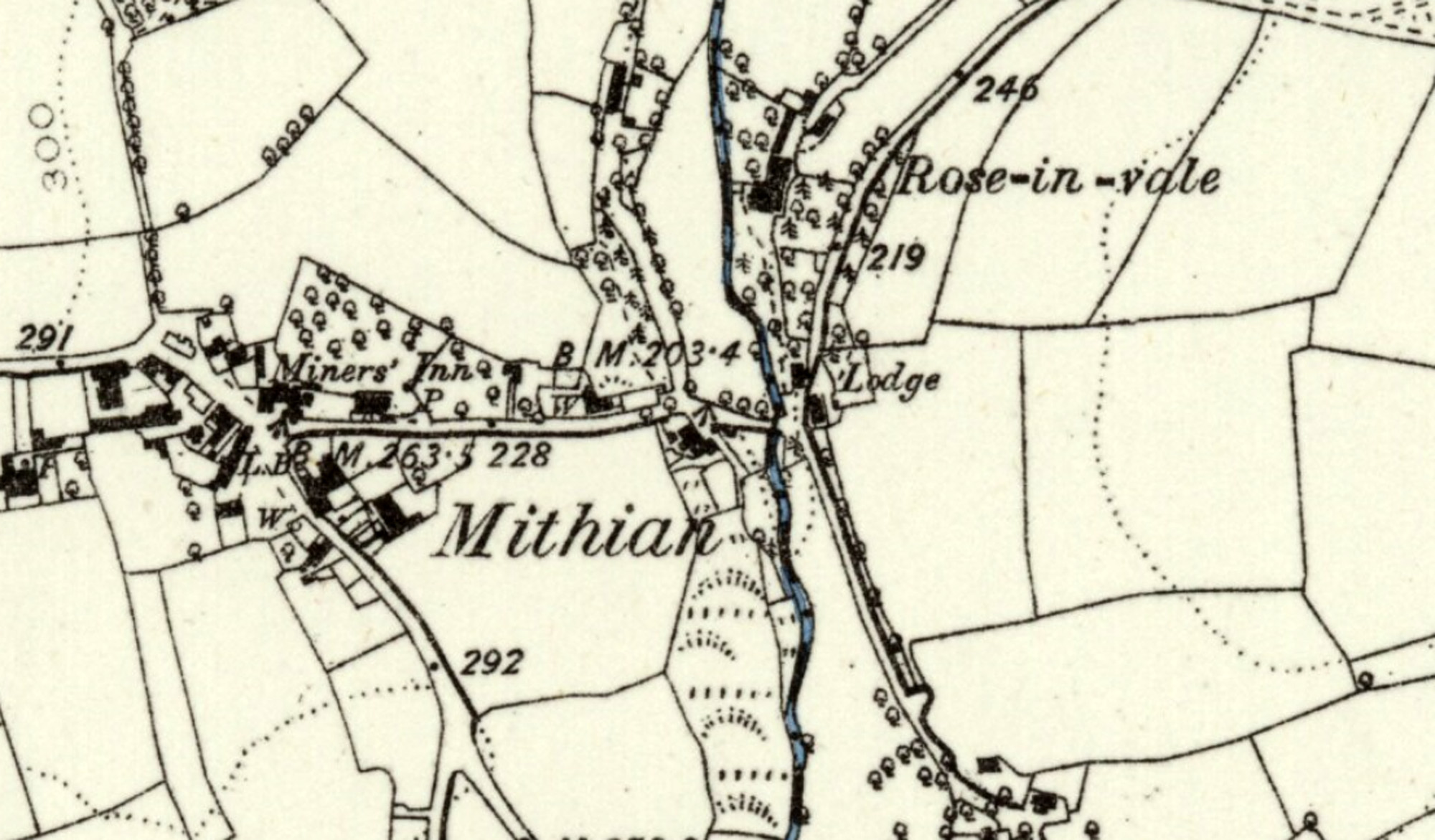
Map of Mithian 1879

Richard Cowling (also called Cowlin) (1811–1879) was born in 1811 in Perranzabuloe. His father was Joan’s brother Edward Cowlin (1784-1850) of Gorran. In 1843 he married Ann Saunders (1812-1895) of Devon. However, the couple had no children. He died in 1879 at Rose in Vale.

By 1900, the property was owned by Captain John Whitford (1858-1926), the manager of a gold mine in South Africa. He was born in 1858 in St Newlyn East, Cornwall and worked in several mines in the area. In 1881, he married Ann Searle Hooper (1859-1927), the daughter of Simon Hooper, a lead miner from Mithian. The couple had seven children. He spent much of their married life in South Africa while she reared the children in England. In about 1900, he bought Rose in Vale for his family. The 1901 Census shows his wife Ann living with five of their younger children. In 1910 there was an article about his mining career in the English newspapers. By 1920 the couple were both living in Rose in Vale. He died in 1926 and she died in Truro in 1927.

The property began operating as a guesthouse early in the 20th century presumably during Captain Whitford's period of ownership and by 1910, was one of the very early properties to register with AA Hotel Services for the provision of accommodation.

By about 1930, Reuben and Annie Hoskin were the residents of Rose in Vale. Annie ran the property as a guest house and he farmed the property. Today the property still provides accommodation and is a venue for special events and exclusive weddings.
