= Old Rectory, St Columb Major =

Historic building in St. Columb Major, Cornwall, England

The Old Rectory
- Location within Cornwall
- 50.4378°N 4.9422°W
- Location: St Columb Major, Cornwall, England

History
- Built: 1849–1851
- Built for: Rev Dr Samuel Walker

Site notes
- Architect: William White
- Architectural style: Victorian Gothic Revival

Listed Building – Grade II*
- Official name: The Old Rectory
- Designated: 16 April 1986
- Reference no.: 1144096

The Old Rectory is a grade II* listed Victorian moated Rectory, located on the banks of the River Menalhyl in St Columb Major, in Cornwall, England. It is a major work by the architect William White. The house is currently under renovation by a private owner to be used as a house.

Commissioned by Dr Samuel Walker, Rector of St Columb, following the speculation that the proposed Cornish bishopric would be based at St Columb. It was built in 1851, on the site of a 14th-century moated medieval house. It is an asymmetrical plan rectory in a Gothic revival style.

Over the years it has undergone a range of alterations. After undergoing several uses in the past it is currently privately owned and unoccupied.

In 2011 it was listed by The Victorian Society as one Britain's most endangered buildings.

After years of inaction by Cornwall Council the Victorian Society launched a petition in 2015 to save the building. Photos in 2015 show the shocking state of neglect and water damage to the building.

== Reading list ==
- Beacham, Peter & Pevsner, Nikolaus (2014) Cornwall. (The Buildings of England.) New Haven: Yale University Press; pp. 523–24
- Hals, William, (1740) The Compleat History of Cornwall
- Henderson, Charles (1930) St Columb Major, Church and Parish; p. 9
- King, Cathcart & James, David (1983) Castellarium Anglicanum: an Index and Bibliography of the Castles in England, Wales and the Islands. London: Kraus International Publications; Volume I, p. 9
- Polsue, Joseph (1867) A Complete Parochial History of the County of Cornwall Truro: William Lake; London: John Camden Hotten, 1867–72, Vol. 1, p. 227
- Salter, Mike (1999) The Castles of Devon and Cornwall. Malvern: Folly Publications; p. 35
