= St Dionis Vicarage =

Coordinates: 51.473373°N 0.200885°W

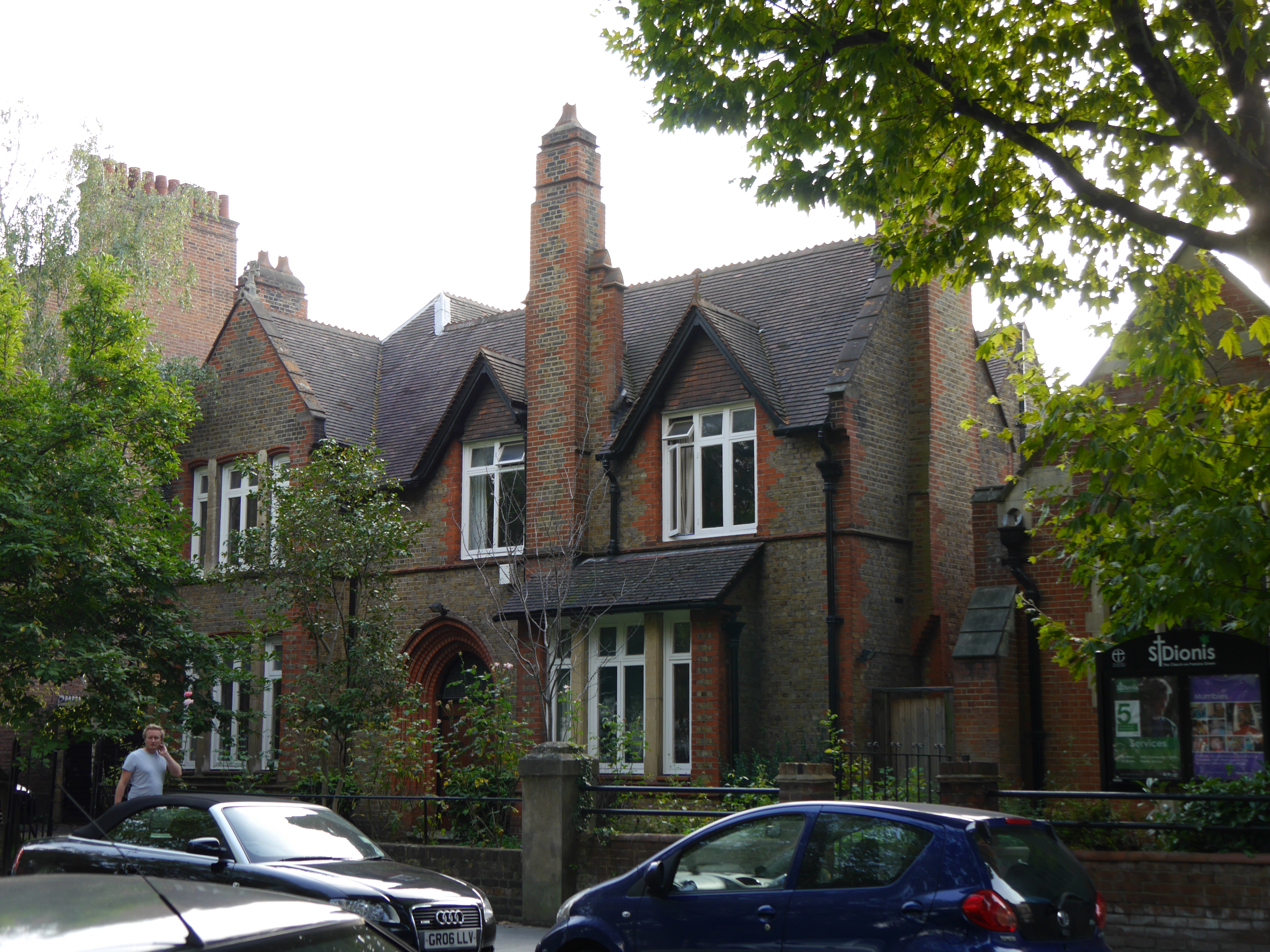
St Dionis Vicarage

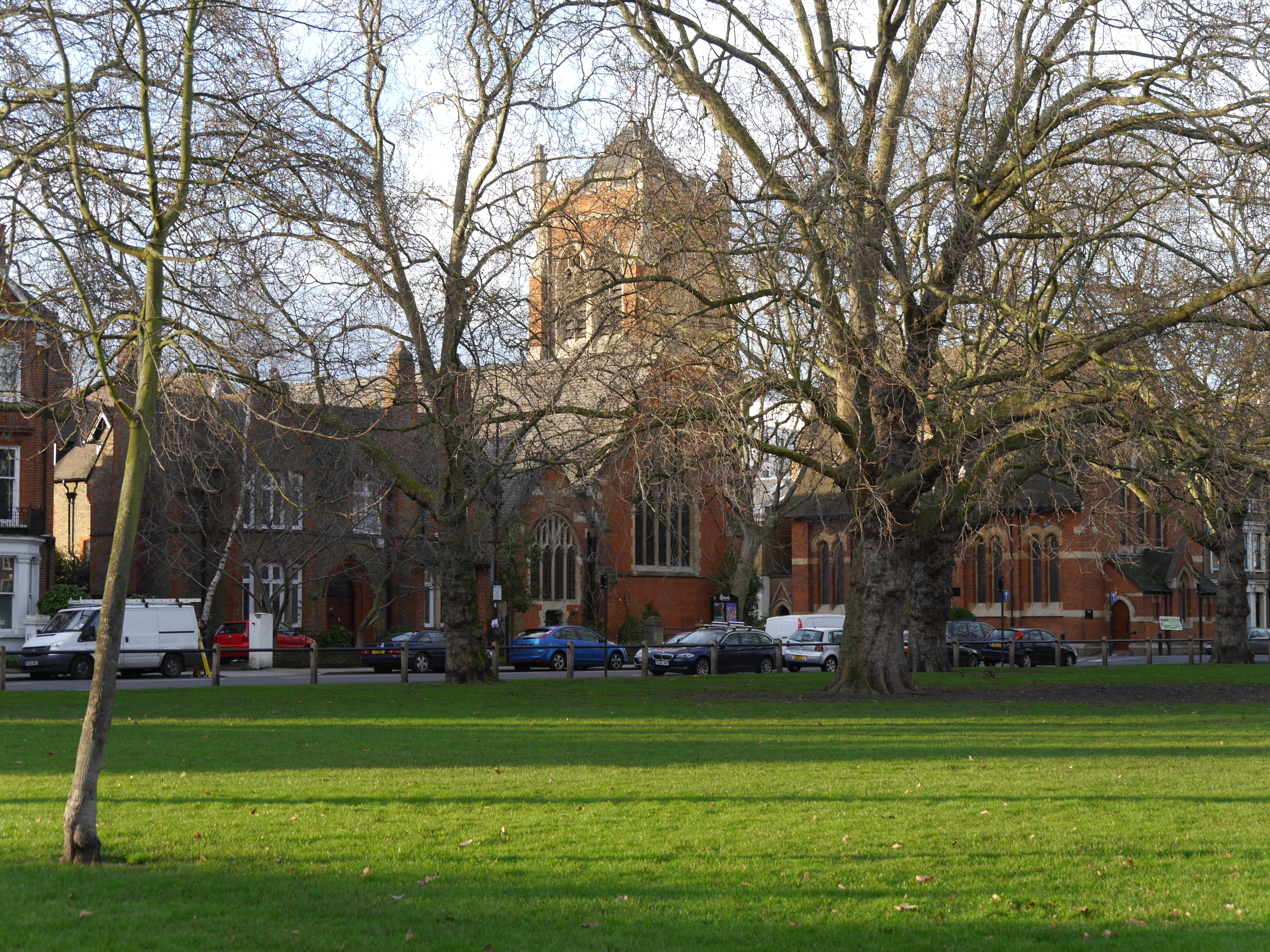
Vicarage, Church and Mission Hall (left to right)

St Dionis Vicarage is a Grade II listed vicarage at 18 Parsons Green, London, SW6 4UH. It was built in 1898–99 to a design by the architect William White.
