= St Dionis Mission Hall =

Church in London, England

Coordinates: 51.473787°N 0.200854°W

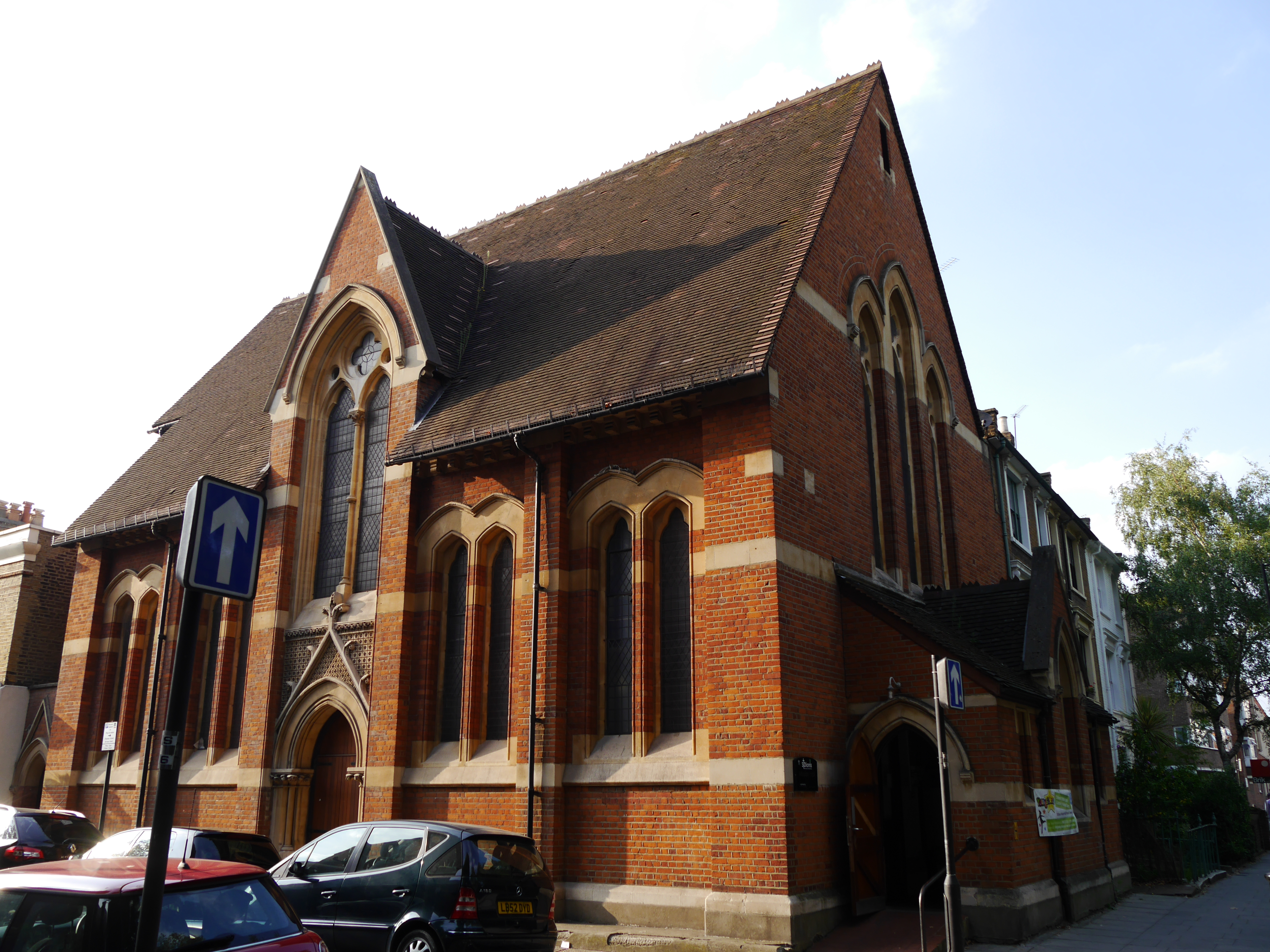
St Dionis Mission Hall

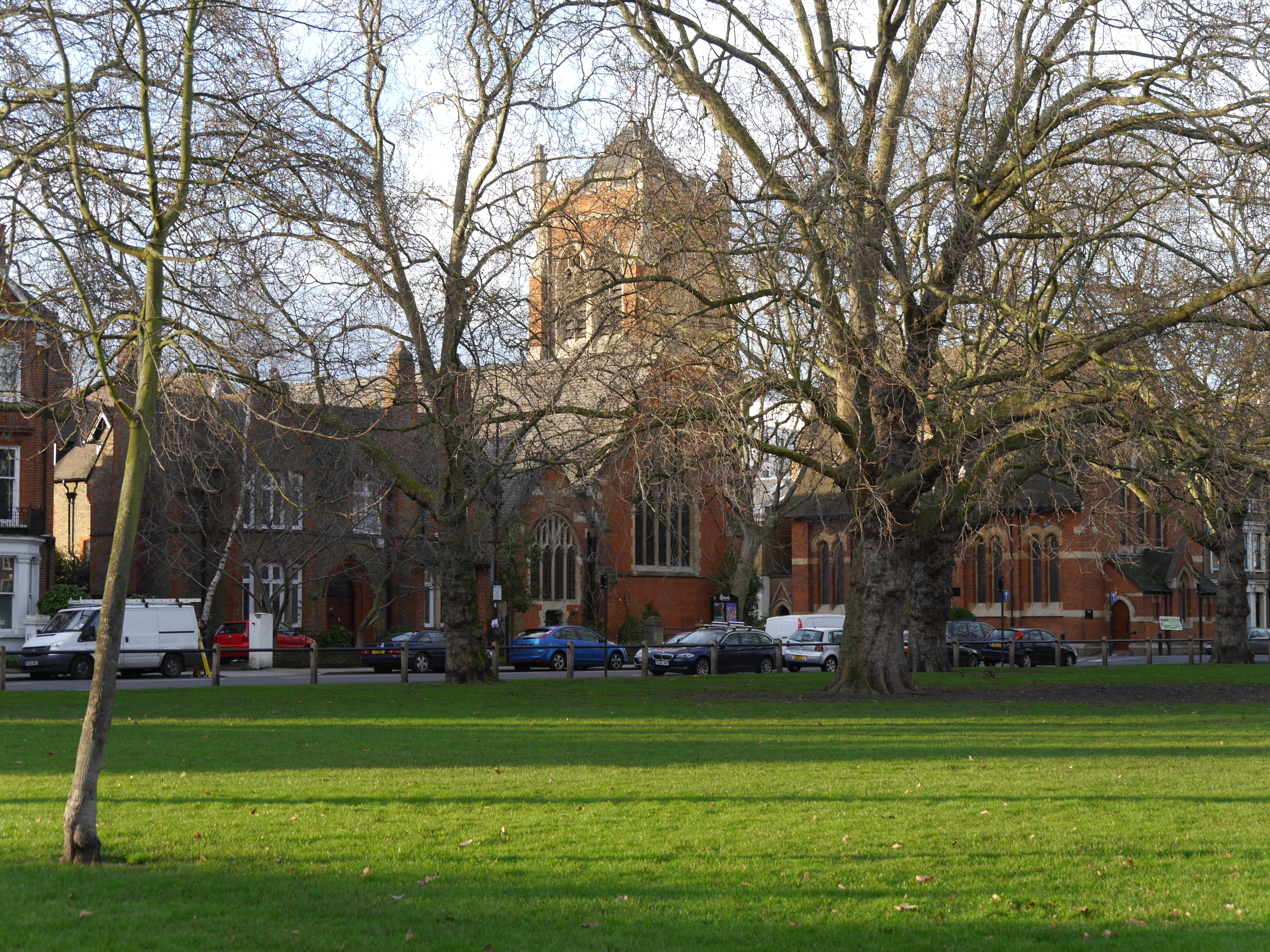
St. Dionis: Vicarage, Church and Mission Hall (left to right)

St Dionis Mission Hall is a Grade II listed church hall at 18a Parsons Green, London, SW6 4UH.

St Dionis Mission Hall was built in 1876, and the architect was Arthur Billing.
