= Stencoose =

Village in Cornwall, England

Coordinates: 50.26°N 5.21°W

Stencoose: Cornish: Stummkoos
- Location within Cornwall
- Unitary authority: Cornwall
- Ceremonial county: Cornwall
- Region: South West
- Country: England
- Sovereign state: United Kingdom
- Post town: Redruth
- Postcode district: TR16
- Police: Devon and Cornwall
- Fire: Cornwall
- Ambulance: South Western
- UK Parliament: Camborne and Redruth

Stencoose (Cornish: Stummkoos) is a village in Cornwall, England, United Kingdom, in the parish of St Agnes. It is located north of Redruth, near the village of Mawla.

== History ==
The Haweis family owned a forty or fifty acre estate in the village for many years. By 1824 the main villages, aside from St Agnes, in the St Agnes Parish were Mithian, Stenclose (Stencoose), and Malow (Mawla).

Stencoose underwent archaeological exploration in 1996.

== Mining ==
Nearly a mile east of Stencoose is Wheal Concord, a tin mine. The Stencoose and Mawla United Mine was worked 1860–62.
