= Mawla, Cornwall =

Village in Cornwall, England

Coordinates: 50.267799°N 5.2256°W

Mawla: Cornish: Mola
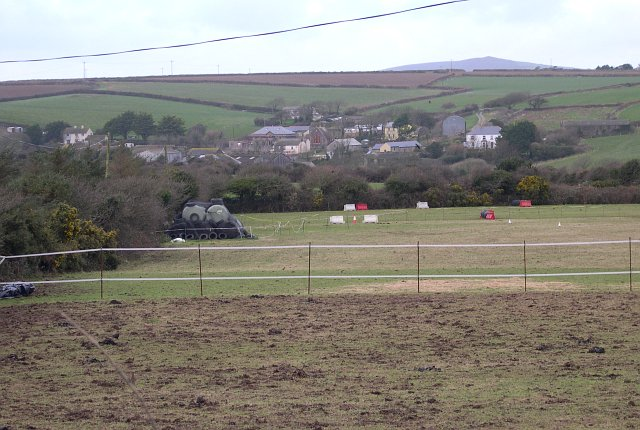
- Mawla

- Location within Cornwall
- Civil parish: Redruth
- Unitary authority: Cornwall
- Shire county: Cornwall
- Ceremonial county: Cornwall
- Region: South West
- Country: England
- Sovereign state: United Kingdom
- Police: Devon and Cornwall
- Fire: Cornwall
- Ambulance: South Western
- UK Parliament: Truro & Falmouth

Mawla (Cornish: Mola) is a village south of Porthtowan in Cornwall, England, UK. The earliest record of Mawla is in 960 AD; the meaning of the name is claimed to be "pigs' place" according to one source. It comprises a cluster of cottages, Mawla Farm, Green Lane Farm, Forge Farm and a Methodist church. Mawla has no shops or pubs.

== Geography ==
Mawla is situated approximately two miles from Mount Hawke in the parish of Redruth and St Agnes Parish on the north coast of Cornwall. Once secluded, it is now visible from surrounding areas, owing to the loss of most of the trees from Dutch elm disease.

== History ==
Mawla is a little hamlet, once known as 'Mawle'. By 1824 the main villages, aside from St Agnes, in the St Agnes Parish were Mithian, Stenclose (Stencoose), and Malow (Mawla). In the past there were a carpenter's shop and more cottages, now demolished.

== Economy ==
Some of the older cottages have now been converted to holiday lettings. Others are still occupied by farmers. Green Lane Farm and Mawla Farm operate as one dairy and vegetable organisation. Mawla Farmhouse still has an old well in its courtyard.

== Religion ==
The Methodist church was built in 1908, the foundation stones laid by local inhabitants. It is an attractive one storey building with arched stained glass windows seating about 120 people.

The old Mawla chapel still exists. The old Sunday school building which was unsafe to use, was demolished about 1960, and rebuilt as a new Sunday school which has since been sold to a private owner by 2008. Years ago the Sunday school tea treat was held in the adjoining field, with a full brass band parade, games and serving of saffron tea treat buns with tea. Today the Sunday school have their annual tea treat outing to St Ives in July.
