= Mithian =

Village in Cornwall, England

Coordinates: 50.312°N 5.169°W

Mithian: Cornish: Mydhyan
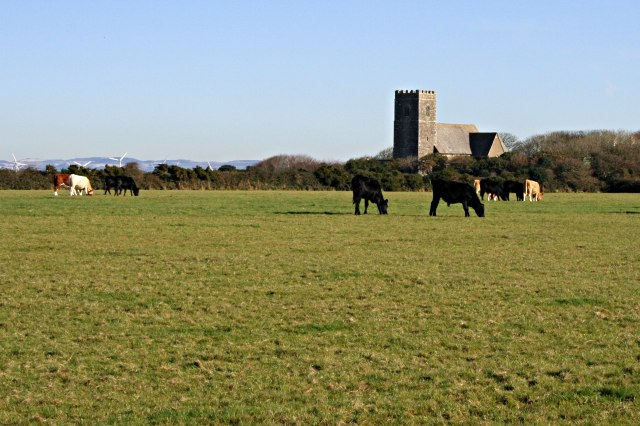
- Mithian parish church near Chiverton Cross

- Location within Cornwall
- Unitary authority: Cornwall
- Shire county: Cornwall
- Ceremonial county: Cornwall
- Region: South West
- Country: England
- Sovereign state: United Kingdom
- Post town: St Agnes
- Postcode district: TR5
- Dialling code: 01872
- Police: Devon and Cornwall
- Fire: Cornwall
- Ambulance: South Western
- UK Parliament: Truro and Falmouth

Mithian (Cornish: Mydhyan) is a village in Cornwall, England, United Kingdom. It is about six miles (9.6 km) northeast of Redruth and a mile east of St Agnes.

Mithian is in the administrative civil parish of St Agnes (which was in the former Carrick District from 1974 to 2009). The population was 510 in the 2001 census. The village has a primary school, Mithian School, situated west of the village at Barkla Shop and a pub, The Miner's Arms, in the village centre.

== History ==
By 1824 the main villages, aside from St Agnes, in the St Agnes Parish were Mithian, Stenclose (Stencoose), and Malow (Mawla). The Rose in Vale Country House Hotel was mainly built in 1761 by Thomas Nankivell.

== Church history ==
Mithian ecclesiastical parish was created in 1846 from parts of St Agnes, Kea, Perranzabuloe and Kenwyn parishes; previously the village had been enumerated as part of St Agnes and Kenwyn parishes. When created, Mithian parish included the village of Blackwater and so the parish church is over two miles from Mithian. The church, built in 1861, was dedicated to St Peter and rather remotely located north of Chiverton Cross at OS grid reference SW746471. The architect was William White. A reredos and coloured window was added in 1882. The eastern window is to the memory of the Reverend Alfred Lord who officiated in the parish from its beginning to his death in 1880. In 1890 the church was closed for restoration while the interior was replastered, the windows reglazed, the stonework of the window in the tower renewed and a new ceiling in the tower. The original spire and tower became unsafe and were taken down in 1898; a replacement tower with no spire was built in 1928.

The church faced closure in 2008 and a planning application was lodged with Cornwall Council to convert the building to residential use. In a local report the Reverend Alan Bashforth said: "The last service took place on Christmas Eve 2006 and although a small but loyal group tried to keep it going, building work costs in the region of £800,000 meant that was not possible. It was not an easy choice to close the church."

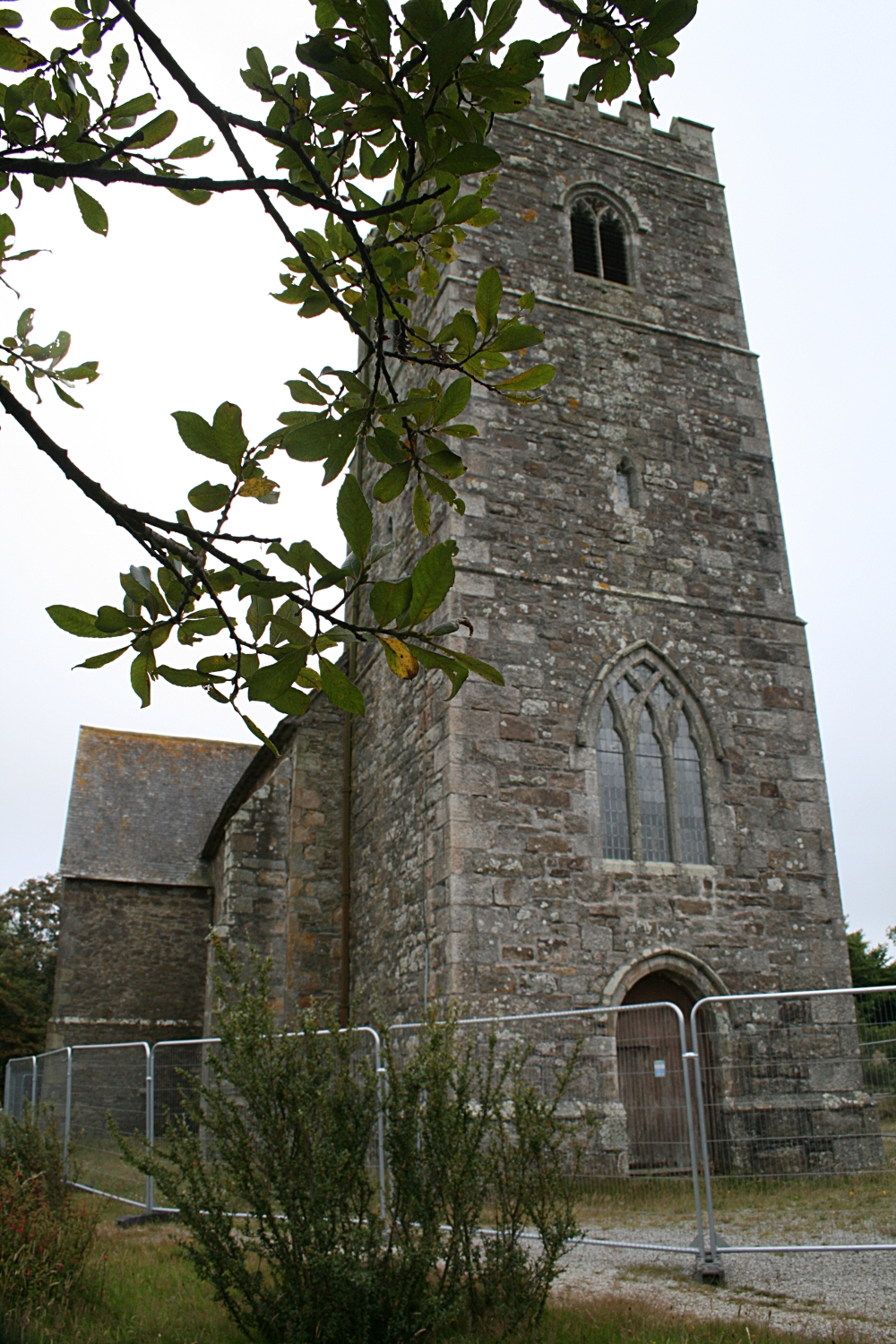
Tower at St Peter's Mithian

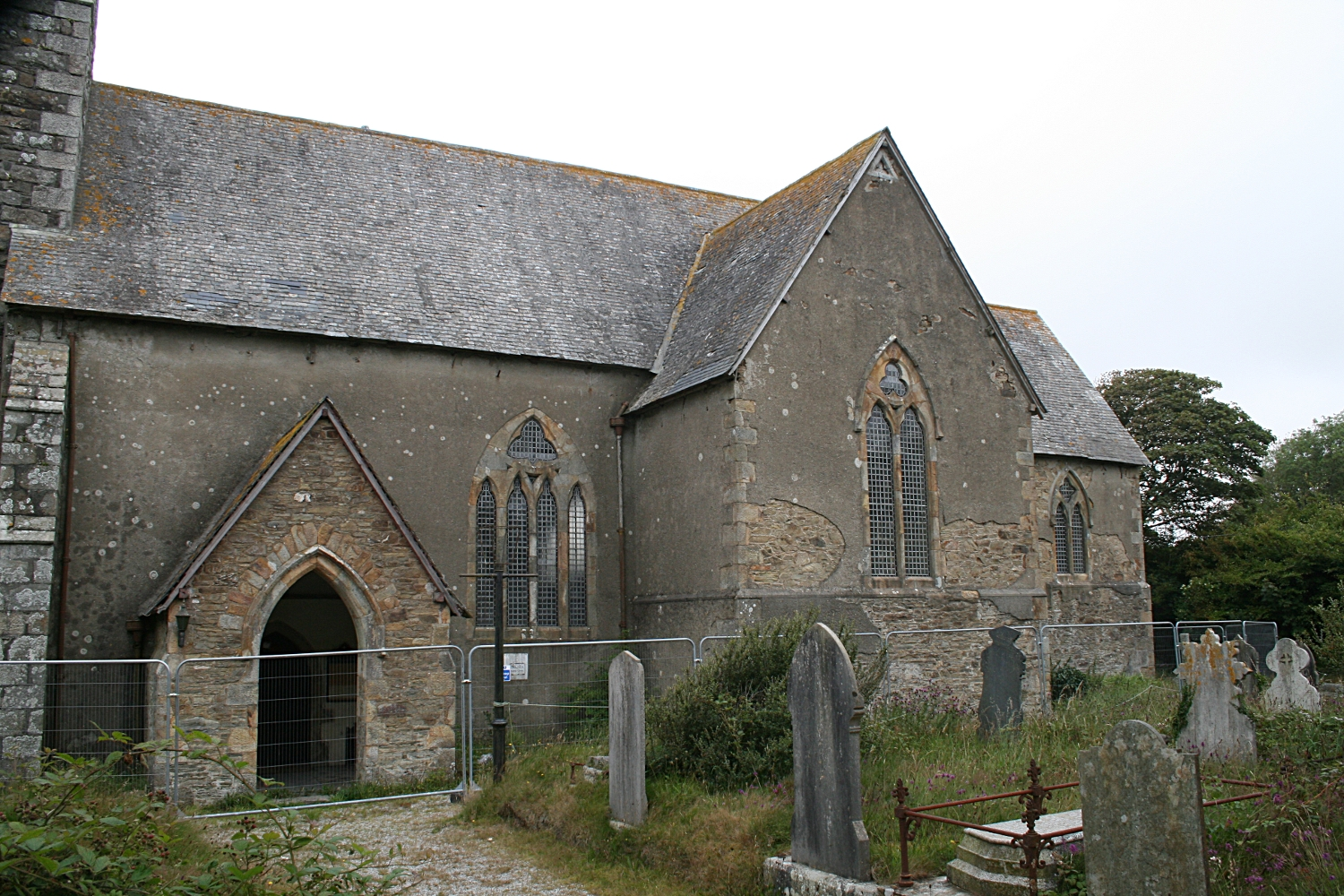
The South entrance of the church

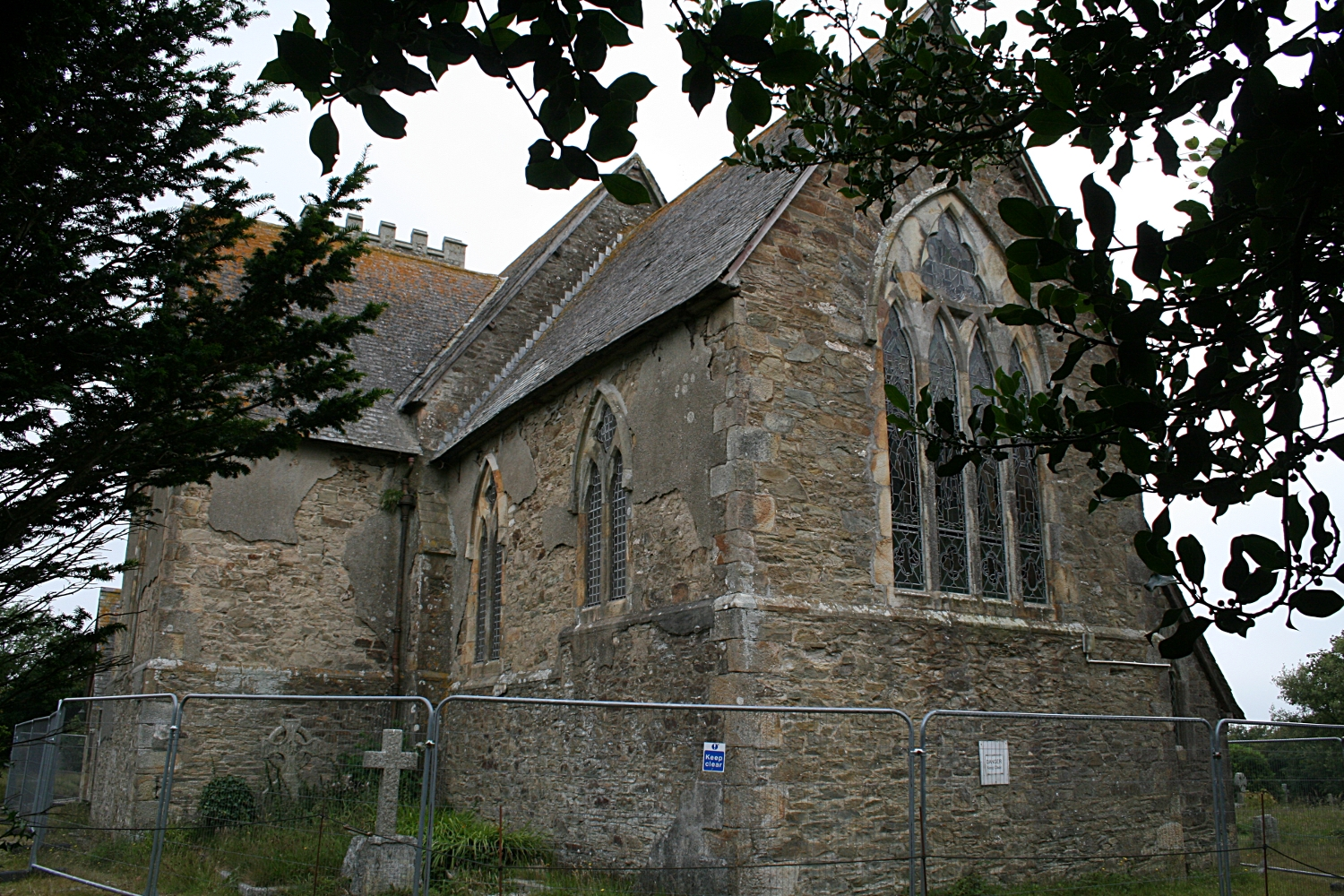
Showing the window in the east end of the church

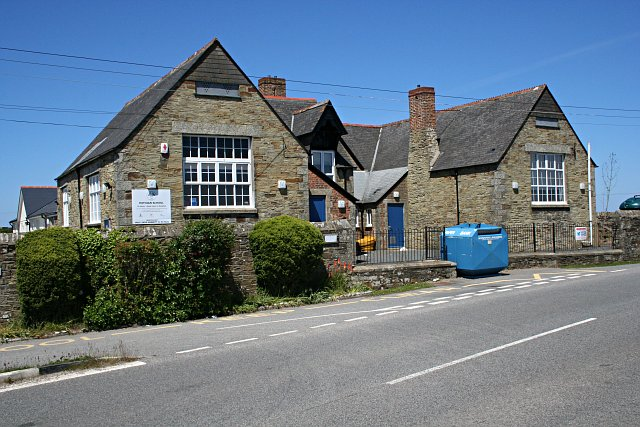
Mithian School near Barkla Shop

== School ==
The Mithian Primary School provides for education of children ages 1 to 11.

== Transport ==
When the first section of the Truro and Newquay Railway was opened in 1903, it passed south of the village. In 1905, extra stations were provided along the line as halts including Mithian Halt railway station. The line closed in February 1963, the first Cornish railway to close under the Beeching axe.

== Public house ==
The Miners Arms Public House was constructed in the 17th century and stands in the centre of the village. It saw additions and renovations in the following two centuries. The building exterior is made of granite, killas rubble, brick and elvan. It is roofed in Delabole slate.

== Gallery ==
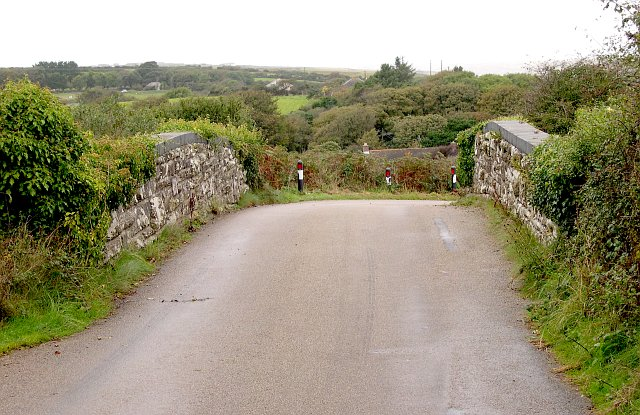
Bridge over the long-closed railway near Mithian

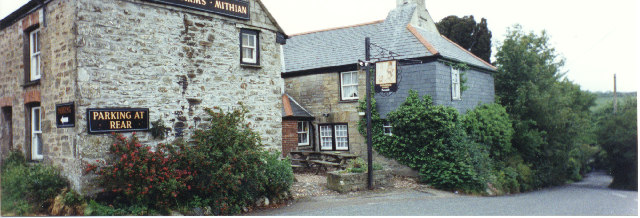
The Miner's Arms pub in Mithian
